= Gilbert Stuart =

American painter (1755–1828)

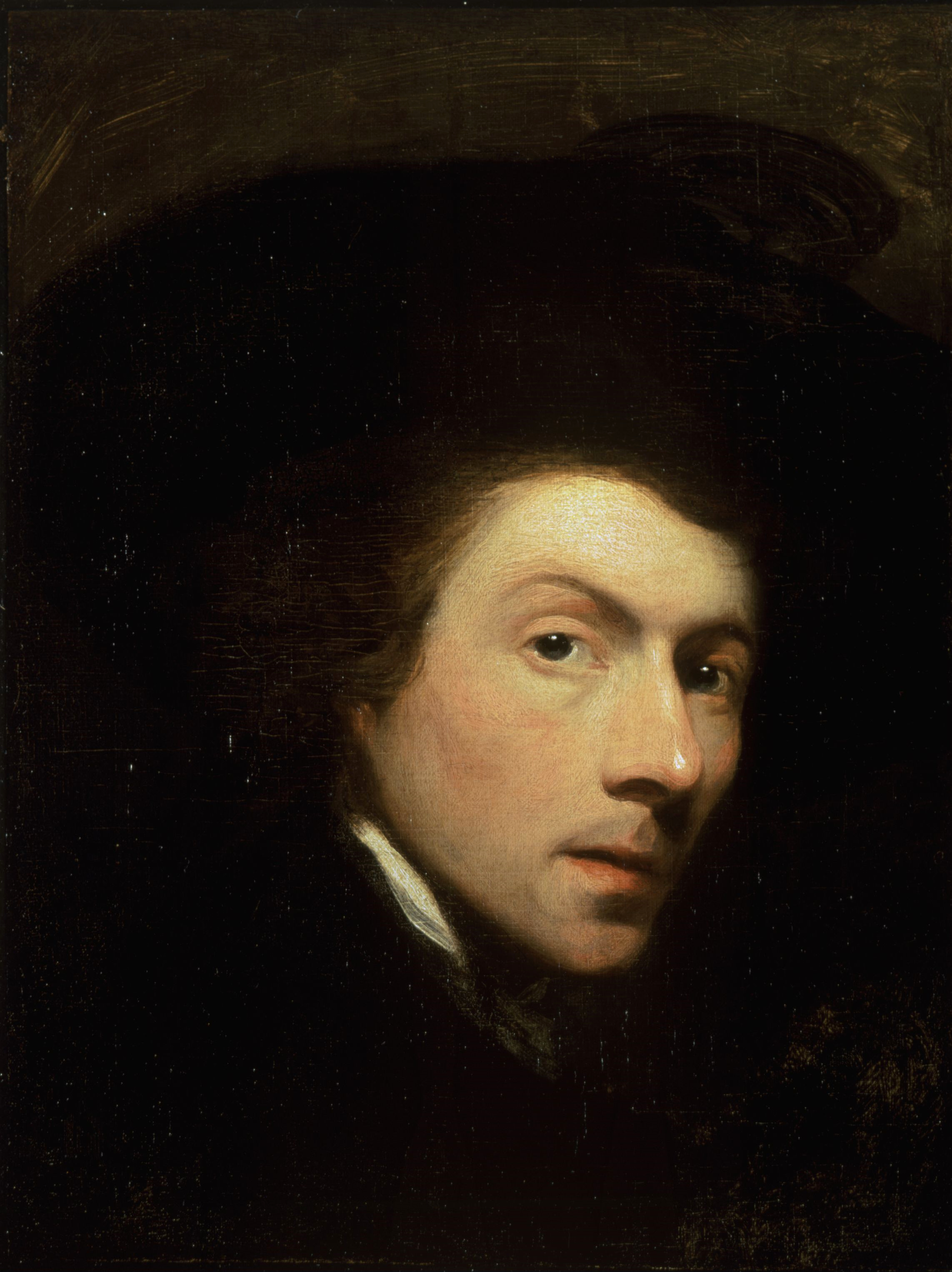
- Self-portrait, c. 1778
- Born: Gilbert Stewart; December 3, 1755; Saunderstown, Colony of Rhode Island and Providence Plantations, British America
- Died: July 9, 1828 (aged 72); Boston, Massachusetts, U.S.
- Known for: Painting
- Notable work: George Washington (The Athenaeum Portrait) (1796); George Washington (Lansdowne Portrait) (1796); Vaughan Portrait (1795); The Skater (1782); Catherine Brass Yates (1794); John Adams (1824)

Gilbert Stuart (né Stewart; December 3, 1755 – July 9, 1828) was an American painter born in the Rhode Island Colony who is widely considered one of America's foremost portraitists. His best-known work is an unfinished portrait of George Washington, begun in 1796, which is usually referred to as the Athenaeum Portrait. Stuart retained the original and used it to paint scores of copies that were commissioned by patrons in America and abroad. The image of George Washington featured in the painting has appeared on the United States one-dollar bill for more than a century and on various postage stamps of the 19th century and early 20th century.

Stuart produced portraits of about 1,000 people, including the first six Presidents. His work can be found today at art museums throughout the United States and the United Kingdom, including the Metropolitan Museum of Art and Frick Collection in New York City, the National Gallery of Art in Washington, D.C., the Philadelphia Museum of Art in Philadelphia, the National Portrait Gallery in Washington D.C., the National Portrait Gallery in London, England, the Worcester Art Museum in Worcester, Massachusetts, and the Boston Museum of Fine Arts.

== Biography ==
=== Early life ===
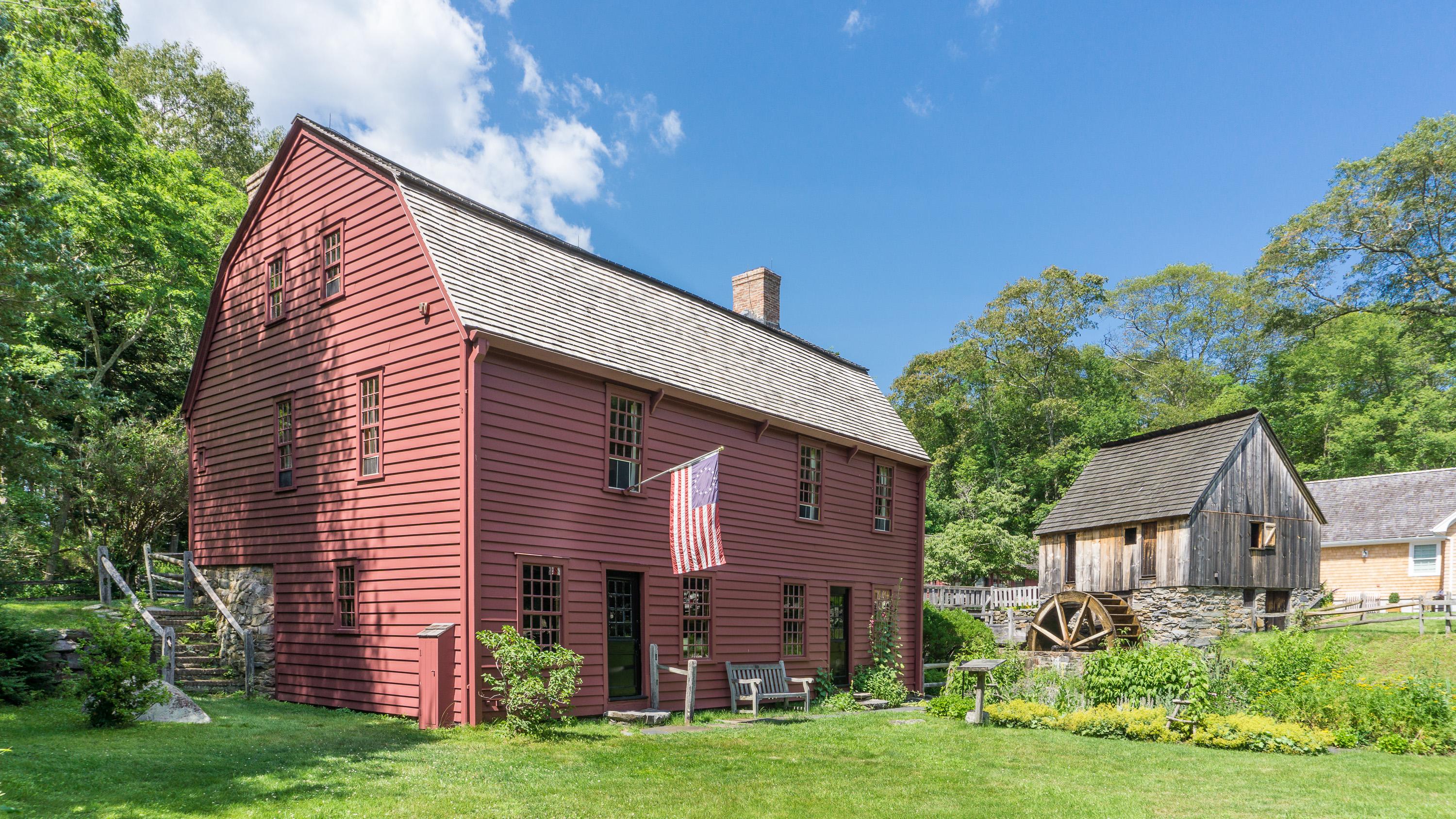
The Gilbert Stuart Birthplace in Saunderstown, Rhode Island

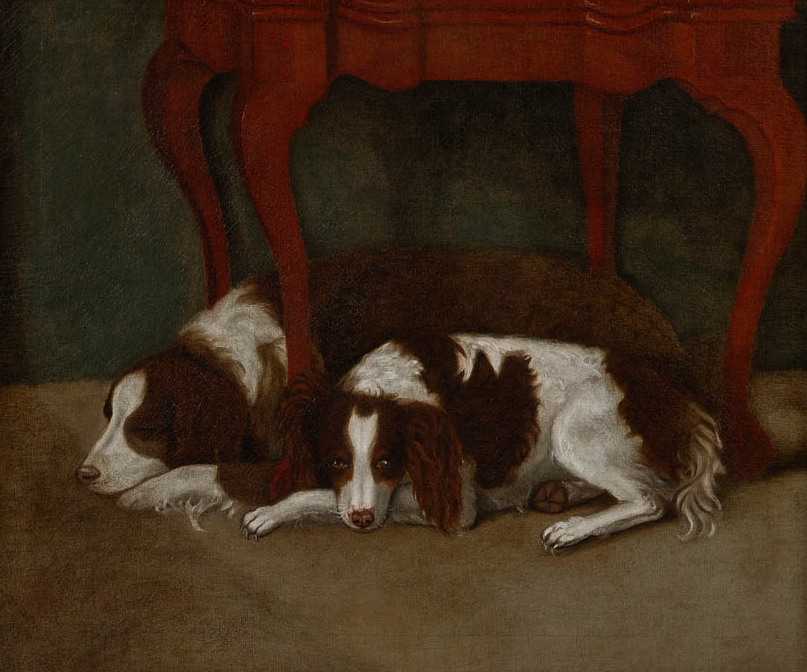
Portrait of William Hunter's spaniels, c. 1770

Stuart was born on December 3, 1755, in Saunderstown, a village of North Kingstown in the Colony of Rhode Island and Providence Plantations, and he was baptized at Old Narragansett Church on April 11, 1756. He was the third child of Gilbert Stuart, a Scottish immigrant employed in the snuff-making industry, and Elizabeth Anthony Stuart, a member of a prominent land-owning family from Middletown, Rhode Island. Stuart's father owned the first snuff mill in America, which was located in the basement of the family homestead.

Stuart moved to Newport, Rhode Island, at the age of six, where his father pursued work in the merchant field. In Newport, he first began to show great promise as a painter. In 1770, he made the acquaintance of Scottish artist Cosmo Alexander, a visitor to the colonies who made portraits of local patrons and who became a tutor to Stuart. Under the guidance of Alexander, Stuart painted the portrait Dr. Hunter's Spaniels when he was 14; it hangs today in the Hunter House Mansion in Newport.

In 1771, Stuart moved to Scotland with Alexander to finish his studies; however, Alexander died in Edinburgh one year later. Stuart tried to maintain a living and pursue his painting career, but to no avail, so he returned to Newport in 1773.

=== England and Ireland ===
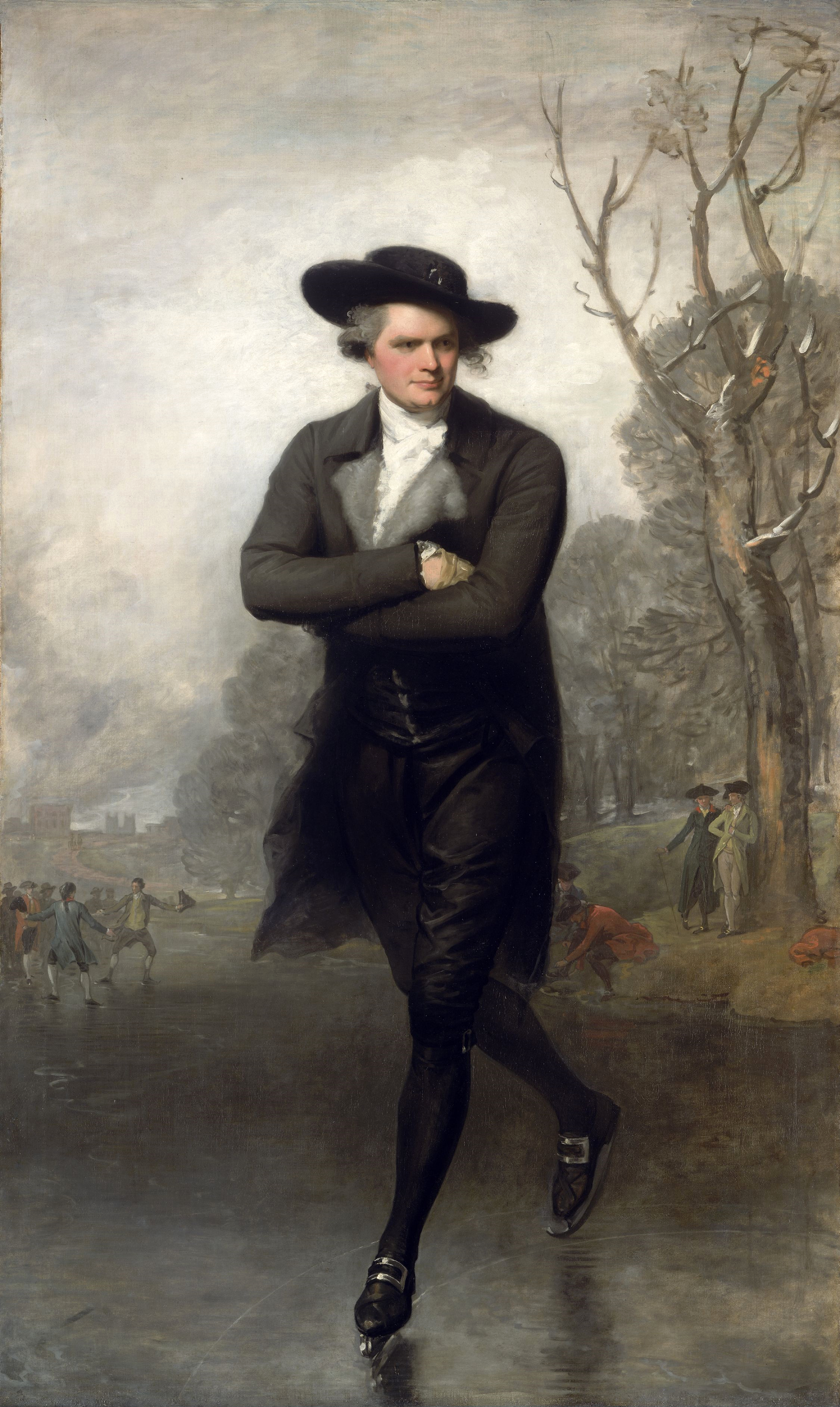
The Skater, a 1782 portrait of Sir William Grant

Stuart's prospects as a portraitist were jeopardized by the onset of the American Revolution and its social disruptions. Although he was a patriot, he departed for England in 1775 following the example set by John Singleton Copley. His painting style during this period began to develop beyond the relatively hard-edged and linear style that he had learned from Alexander. He was unsuccessful at first in pursuit of his vocation, but he became a protégé of Benjamin West in 1777 and studied with him for the next six years. The relationship was beneficial, with Stuart exhibiting for the first time at the Royal Academy in spring of 1777.

By 1782, Stuart had met with success, largely due to acclaim for The Skater, a portrait of Sir William Grant. It was Stuart's first full-length portrait and, according to a rival, it belied the prevailing opinion that Stuart "made a tolerable likeness of a face, but as to the figure, he could not get below the fifth button'". Stuart said that he was "suddenly lifted into fame by a single picture".

The prices for his pictures were exceeded only by those of renowned English artists Joshua Reynolds and Thomas Gainsborough. Despite his many commissions, however, he was habitually neglectful of finances and was in danger of being sent to debtors' prison. In 1787, he fled to Dublin, Ireland where he painted and accumulated debt with equal vigor.

=== New York City and Philadelphia ===
Stuart ended his 18-year stay in Britain and Ireland in 1793, leaving behind numerous unfinished paintings. He returned to the United States with a particular goal of painting a portrait of George Washington and having an engraver reproduce it and provide for his family through the engraving's sale. He settled briefly in New York City and pursued portrait commissions from influential people who could bring him to Washington's attention. In 1794, he painted statesman John Jay, from whom he received a letter of introduction to Washington. In 1795, Stuart moved to the Germantown section of Philadelphia, where he opened a studio, and Washington posed for him later that year.

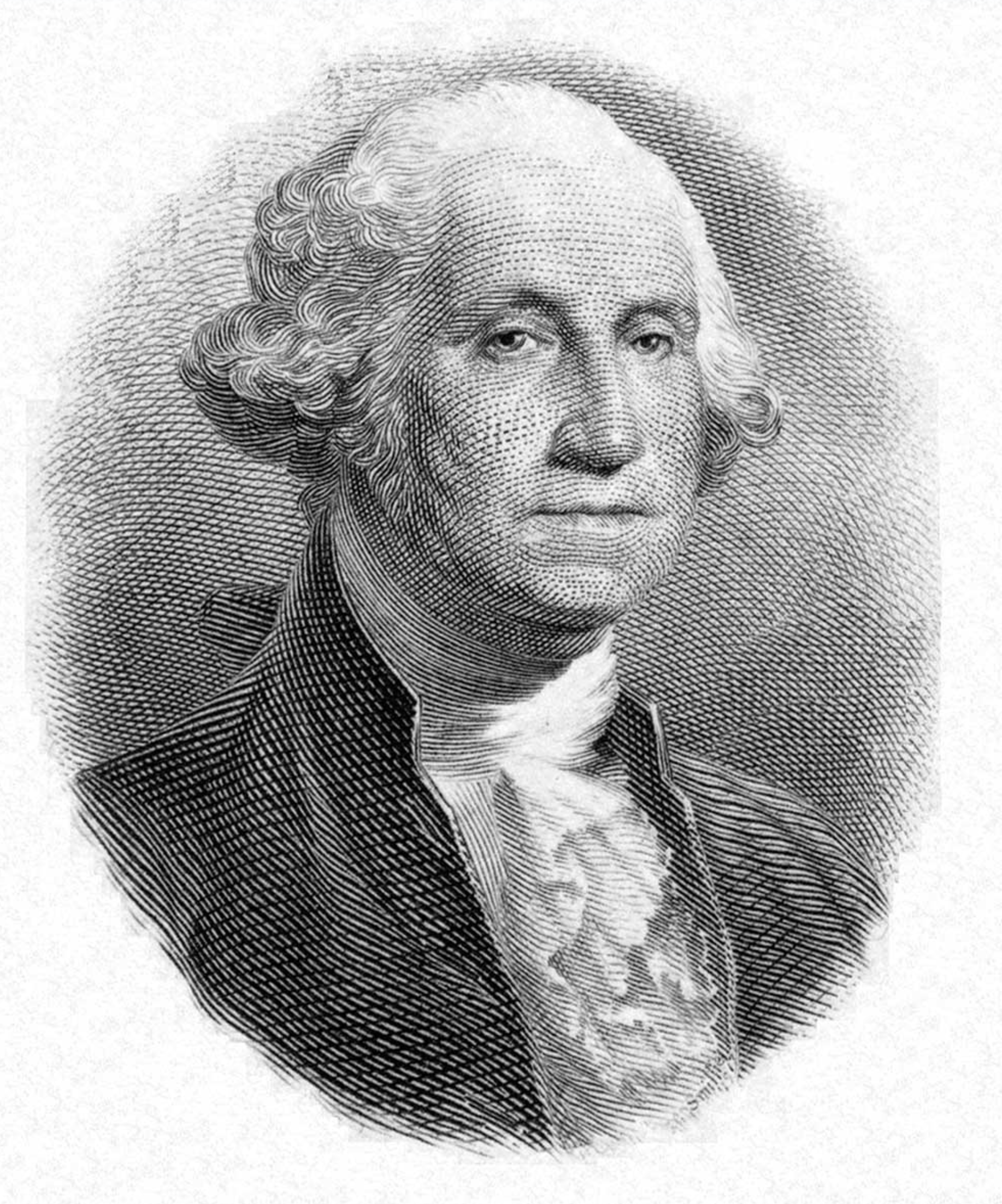
George Washington engraving by G.F.C. Smillie

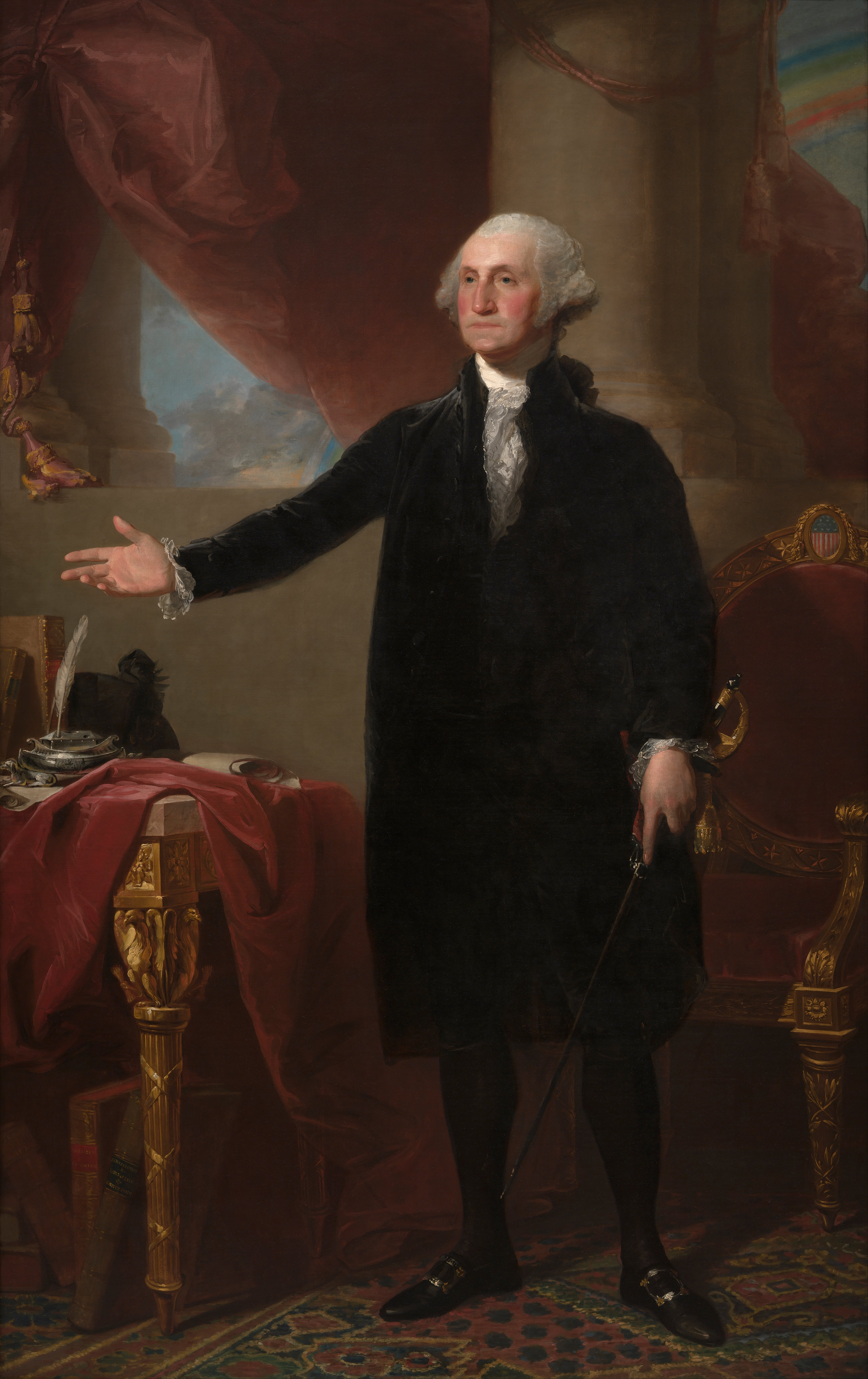
Lansdowne Portrait of George Washington, 1796

Stuart painted Washington in a series of iconic portraits, each of them leading to a demand for copies and keeping him busy and highly paid for years. The most famous and celebrated of these likenesses, the Athenaeum Portrait, is portrayed on the United States one-dollar bill. Stuart painted about 50 reproductions of it. However, he avoided completing the original version. After finishing Washington's face, he kept it to make copies which he sold for $100 each. Thus, the original portrait remained in its unfinished state at the time of his death in 1828. An engraver at the US Bureau of Engraving and Printing, George Frederick Cumming Smillie, made an etching of the painting which was used on multiple banknotes. A vignette of the portrait appears on the 1899 2-dollar silver certificate, and the one dollar note of (1918 to 2023). United States one-dollar bills featured the image for decades (1918 to 2023).

The painting was jointly purchased by the National Portrait Gallery and Museum of Fine Arts, Boston in 1980, and is generally on display in the National Portrait Gallery.

Another celebrated image of Washington is the full-length Lansdowne Portrait, now in the National Portrait Gallery. Its historical importance is almost matched by an early forgery based on it which was purchased for the White House. This painting was rescued during the Burning of Washington in the War of 1812 thanks to the efforts of First Lady Dolley Madison and Paul Jennings, one of President James Madison's slaves. Three replicas of the original portrait are accepted as by Stuart. Additional copies were painted by other artists. In 1803, Stuart opened a studio in Washington, D. C.

In 1800, Thomas Jefferson paid Stuart $100.00 for a portrait but never received it, because in 1805, Stuart painted another portrait of Jefferson over the 1800 portrait. In 1821, Stuart sent a copy of the 1805 so called "Edgehill" portrait to Jefferson. The original 1805 portrait became part of Jane Stuart collection until it was damaged in a fire in 1853. In 1937, Orland Campbell acquired the 1805 portrait and discovered the truth. In June 1959, Campbell had an exhibit at Amherst College of the 1800/1805 portrait and his reconstruction of the "lost" 1800 portrait. Campbell also published an account "The Lost Portraits of Thomas Jefferson Painted by Gilbert Stuart Recovered and Studied by Orland and Courtney Campbell" (1959).

=== Boston, 1805–1828 ===
Stuart moved to Devonshire Street in Boston in 1805, continuing in both critical acclaim and financial troubles. He exhibited works locally at Doggett's Repository and Julien Hall. Predictably, he was sought out for advice by other American artists, such as John Trumbull, Thomas Sully, Washington Allston, and John Vanderlyn.

=== Personal life ===
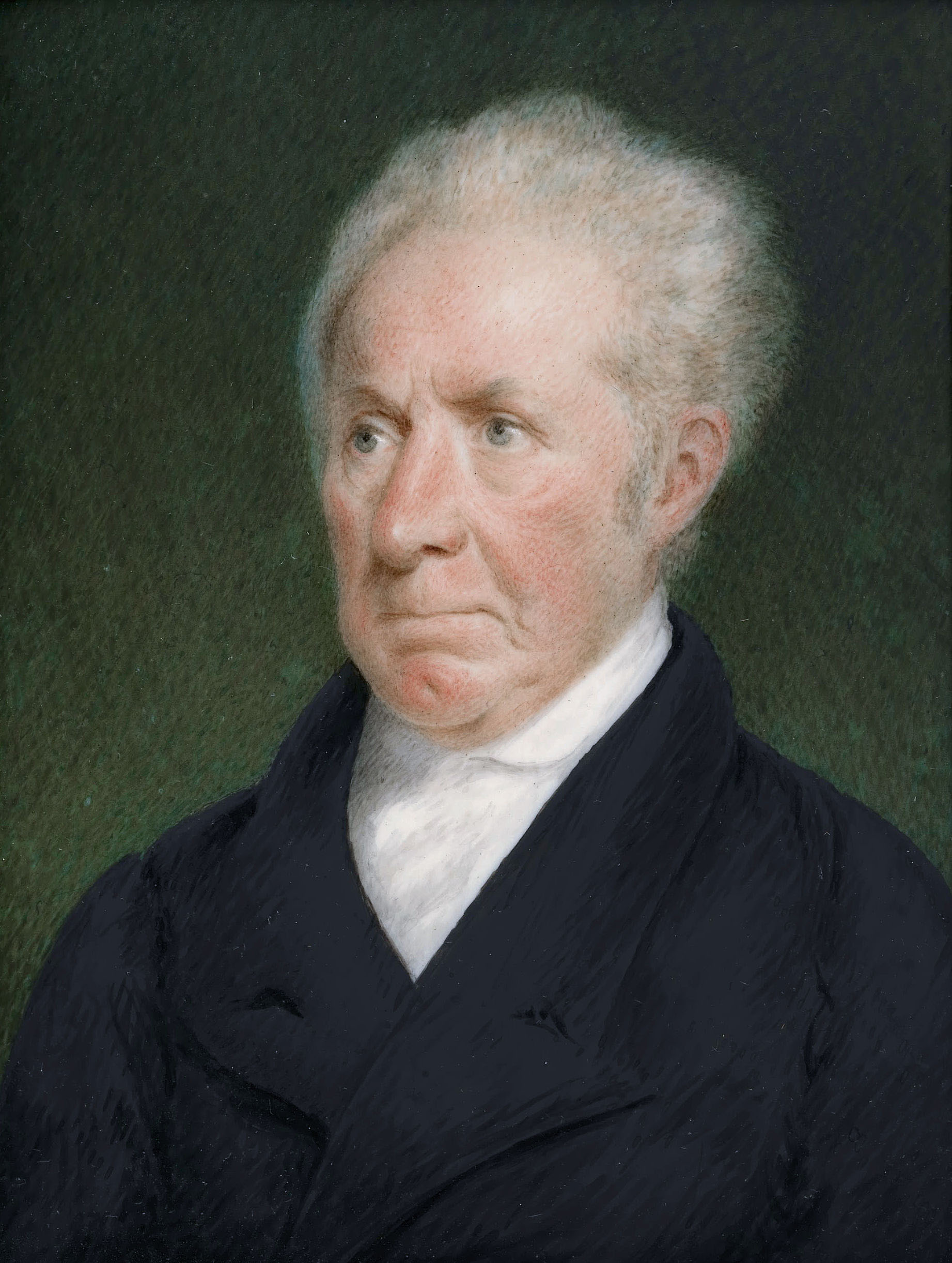
Portrait of Stuart by Sarah Goodridge, c. 1825

Stuart married Charlotte Coates around September 1786; she was 13 years his junior and "exceedingly pretty". They had 12 children, five of whom died by 1815 and two others of whom died in their youth. Their daughter Jane (1812–1888) was also a painter. She sold many of his paintings and her replicas of them from her studios in Boston and Newport, Rhode Island. In 2011, she was inducted into the Rhode Island Heritage Hall of Fame.

In 1824, Stuart suffered a stroke which left him partially paralyzed, but he continued to paint for two years until his death in Boston on July 9, 1828, at 72. He was buried in the Central Burial Ground at Boston Common.

Stuart left his family deeply in debt, and his wife and daughters were unable to purchase a grave site. He was, therefore, buried in an unmarked grave which was purchased cheaply from Benjamin Howland, a local carpenter. His family recovered from their financial troubles 10 years later, and they planned to move his body to a family cemetery in Newport. However, they could not remember the exact location of his body, and it was never moved. There is a monument for Stuart, his wife, and their children at the Common Burying Ground in Newport.

The Boston Athenæum held a benefit exhibition of Stuart's works in August 1828 in an effort to provide financial aid for his family. More than 250 portraits were lent for this critically acclaimed and well-subscribed exhibition. This also marked the first public showing of his unfinished 1796 Athenæum portrait of Washington.

== Legacy ==
By the end of his career, Gilbert Stuart had painted the likenesses of more than 1,000 American political and social figures. He was praised for the vitality and naturalness of his portraits, and his subjects found his company agreeable. John Adams said:

Speaking generally, no penance is like having one's picture done. You must sit in a constrained and unnatural position, which is a trial to the temper. But I should like to sit to Stuart from the first of January to the last of December, for he lets me do just what I please, and keeps me constantly amused by his conversation.

Stuart was known for working without the aid of sketches, beginning directly upon the canvas. His approach is suggested by the advice which he gave to his pupil Matthew Harris Jouett: "Never be sparing of colour, load your pictures, but keep your colours as separate as you can. No blending, tis destruction to clear & bea[u]tiful effect." Although this is an exaggeration to avoid muddiness, Stuart's colors were remarkably fresh. At Stuart's best, he had an extraordinary ability to convey the impression of "luminous, transparent flesh" with color coming from beneath. The face seemed to be embued with life, while the beauty of its coloring conveyed a spiritual quality to contemporaries. Although uneven, he could produce astonishingly strong likenesses.

John Henri Isaac Browere created a life mask of Stuart around 1825. In 1940, the U.S. Post Office issued a series of postage stamps called the "Famous Americans Series" commemorating famous artists, authors, inventors, scientists, poets, educators, and musicians. Gilbert Stuart is found on the 1 cent issue in the artists category, along with James McNeill Whistler, Augustus Saint-Gaudens, Daniel Chester French, and Frederic Remington.

Today, Stuart's birthplace in Saunderstown, Rhode Island, is open to the public as the Gilbert Stuart Birthplace and Museum. The birthplace consists of the original house where he was born, with copies of his paintings hanging throughout the house, as well as a separate art gallery in which are displayed several original paintings by both Gilbert Stuart and his daughter Jane. The museum opened in 1931.

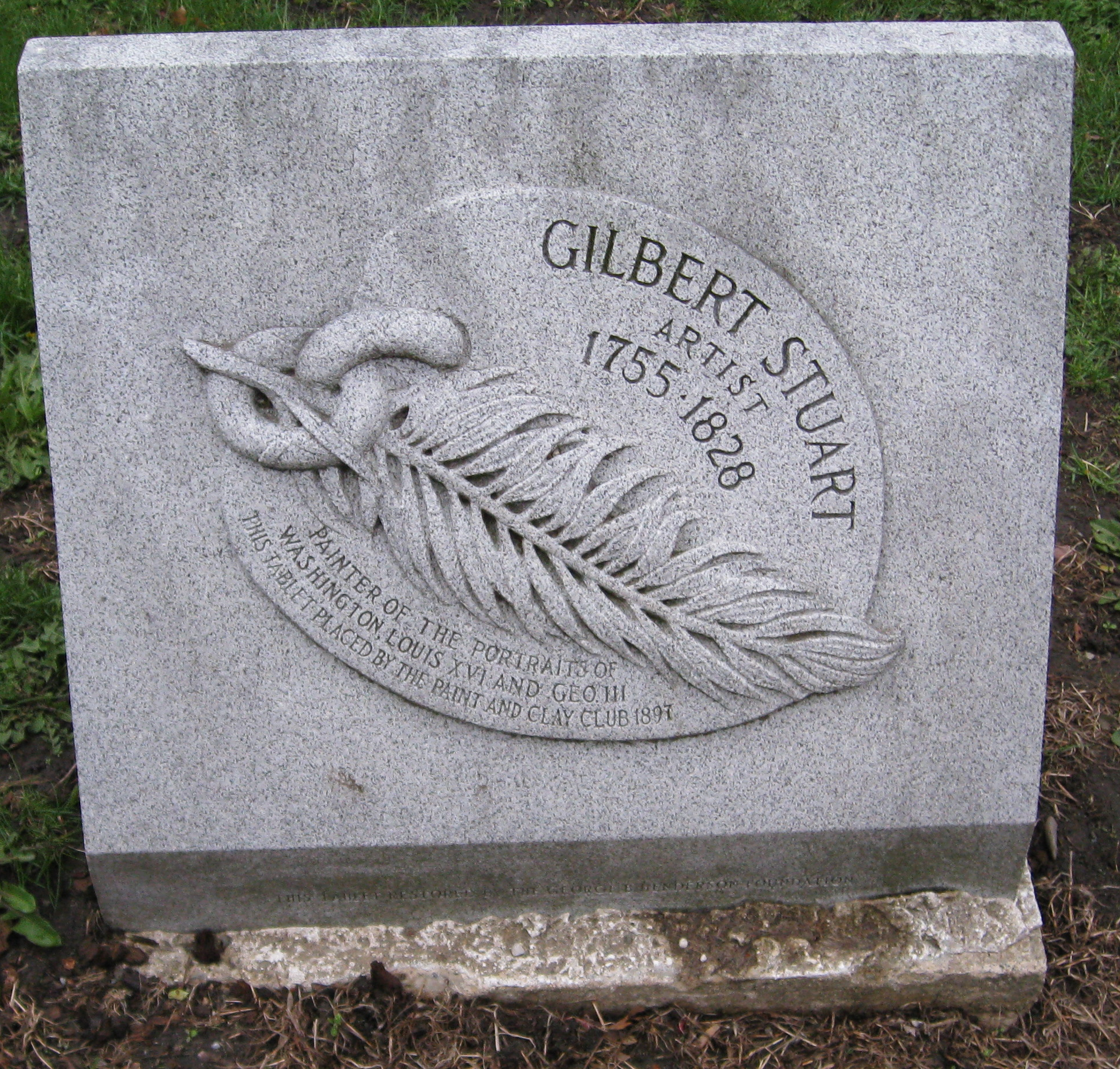
Memorial tablet located in the Boston Common

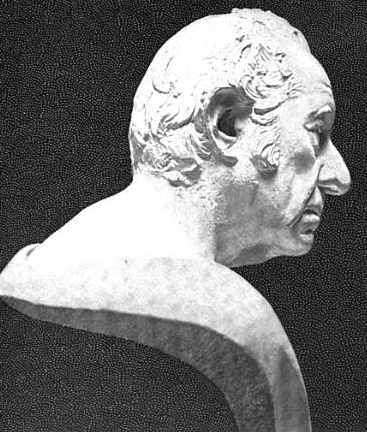
John H. I. Browere's life mask portrait of Stuart, c. 1825

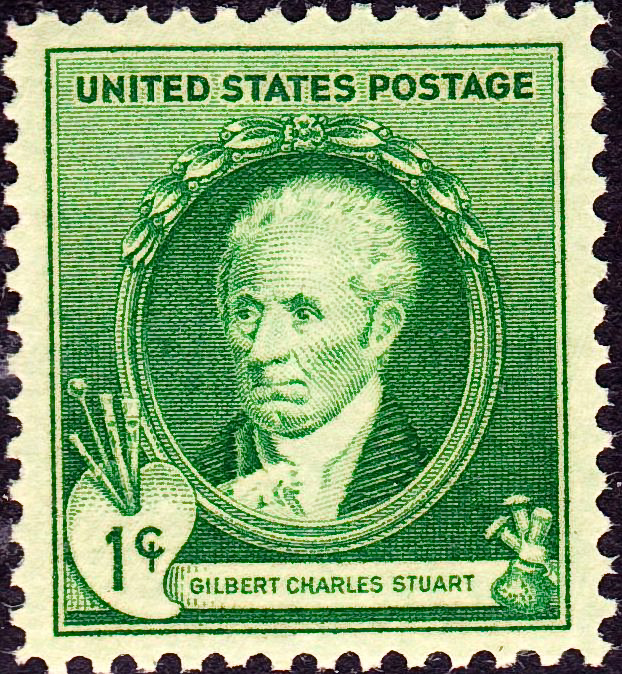
Gilbert Stuart
Issue of 1940

Gilbert Stuart's paintings of Washington, Jefferson, and others have served as models for dozens of U.S. postage stamps. Washington's image from the famous portrait The Athenaeum is probably the most noted example of Stuart's work on postage.

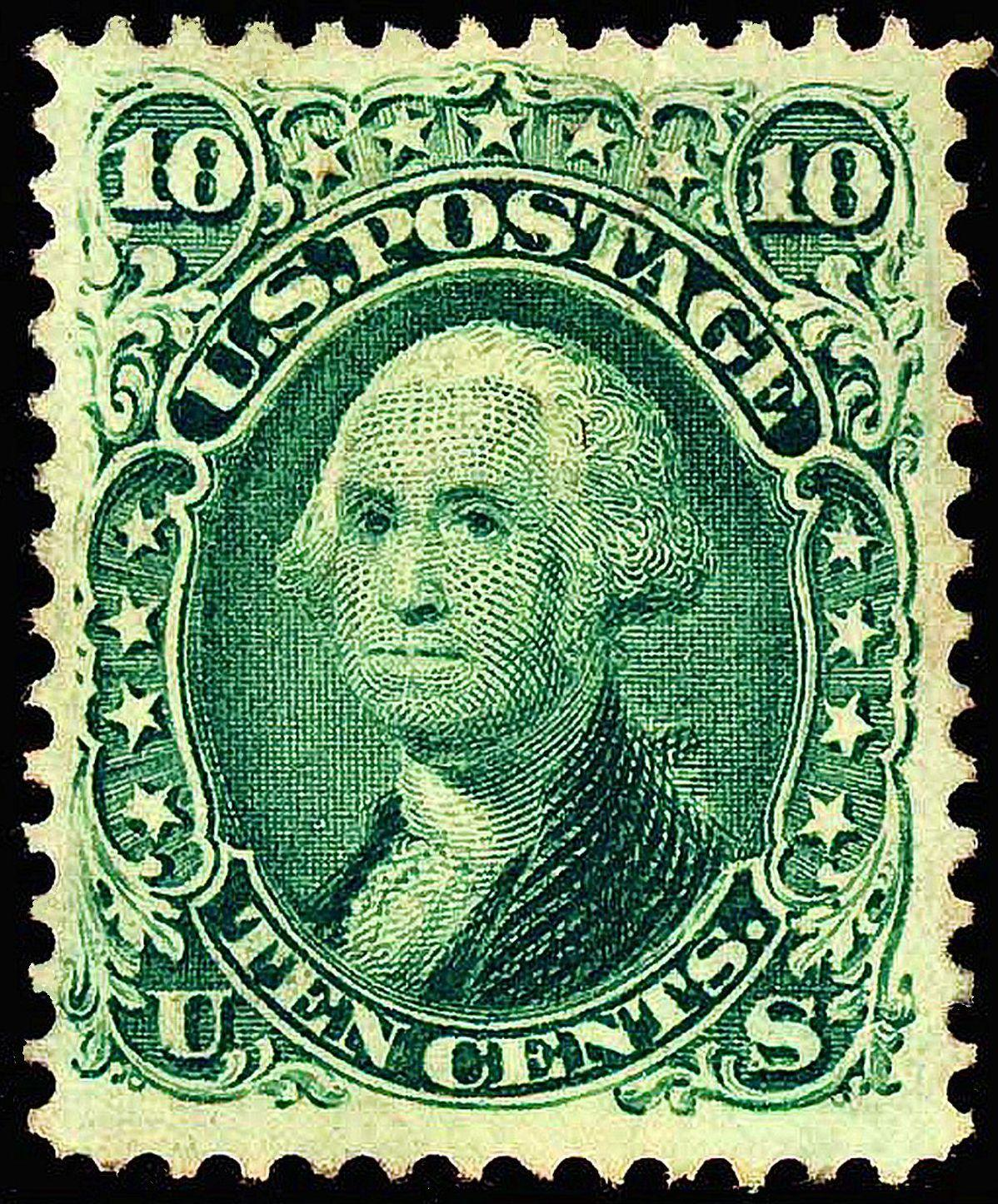
1861

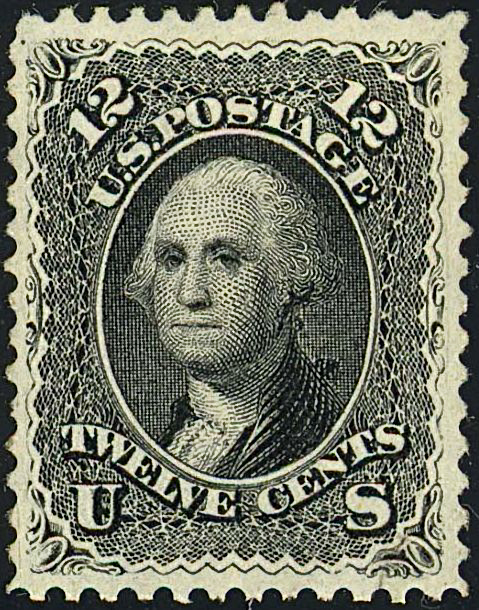
1861

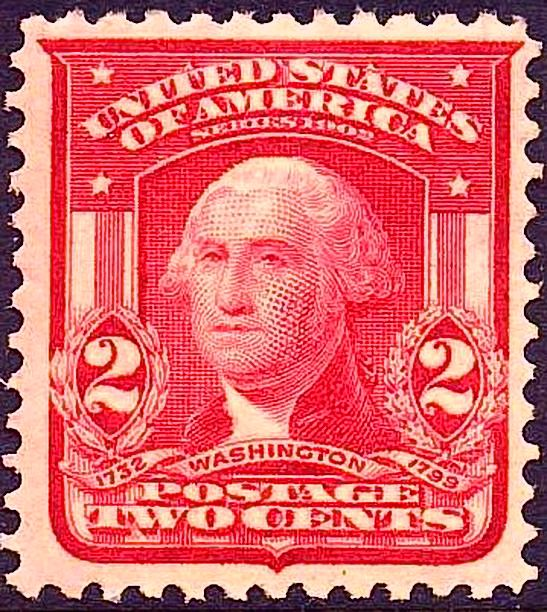
1903

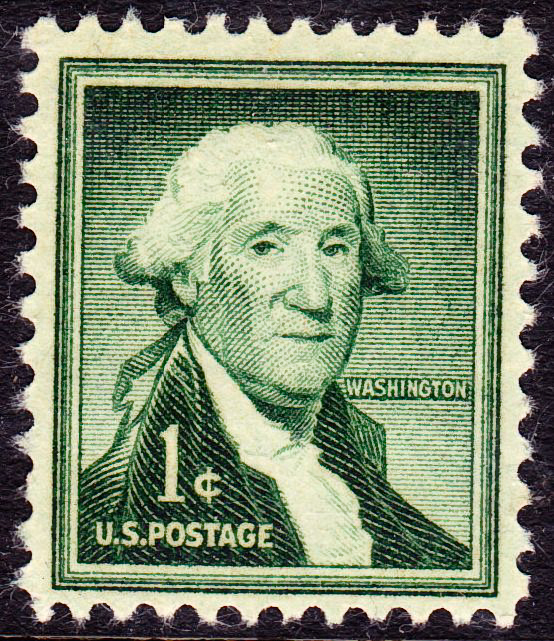
1954

== Notable people painted ==
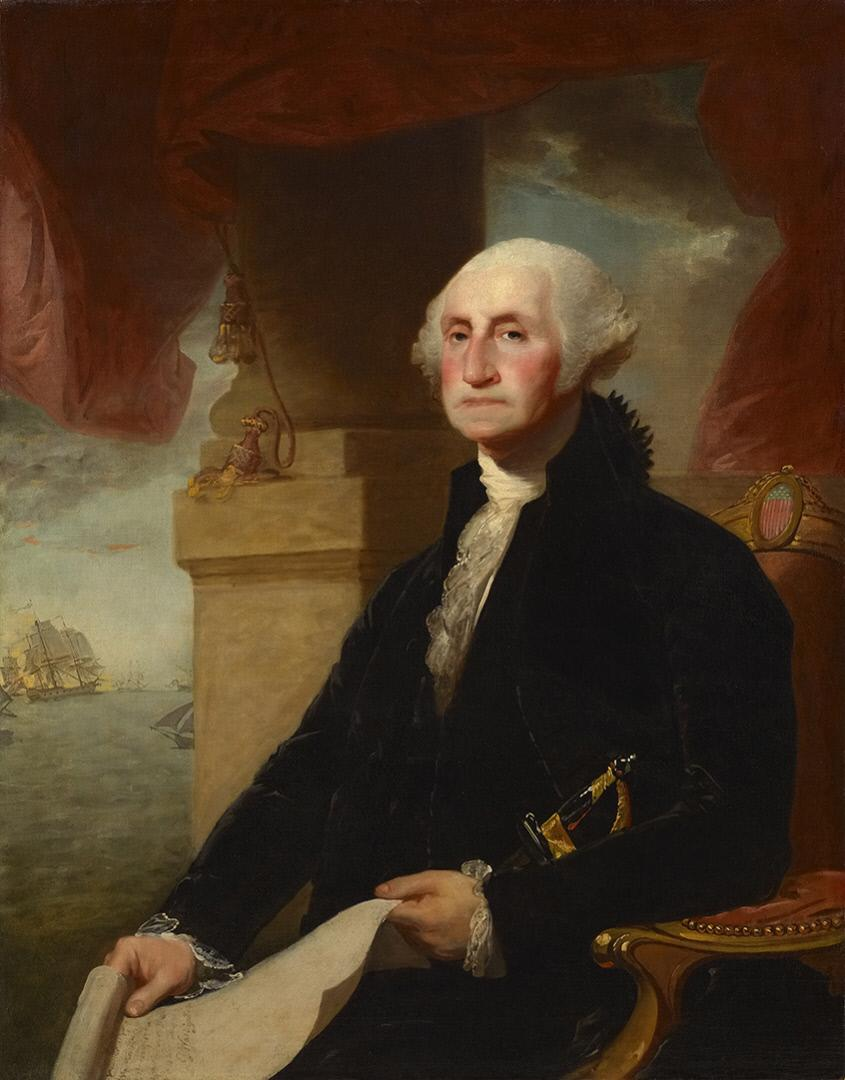
George Washington (The Constable-Hamilton Portrait, 1797) Crystal Bridges Museum of American Art, Bentonville, Arkansas

This is a partial list of portraits painted by Stuart.

- Abigail Adams – Second First Lady of the United States, wife of John Adams
- John Adams – Second President of the United States
- John Quincy Adams – Sixth President of the United States
- Charles Humphrey Atherton – United States Representative from New Hampshire from 1815 to 1817
- John Jacob Astor – First American multi-millionaire, fur trader, art patron
- John Bannister – Owner of Bannister's Wharf in Newport, Rhode Island
- Commodore John Barry – Father of the American Navy
- Commodore Oliver Hazard Perry – Hero of the Battle of Lake Erie in 1814.
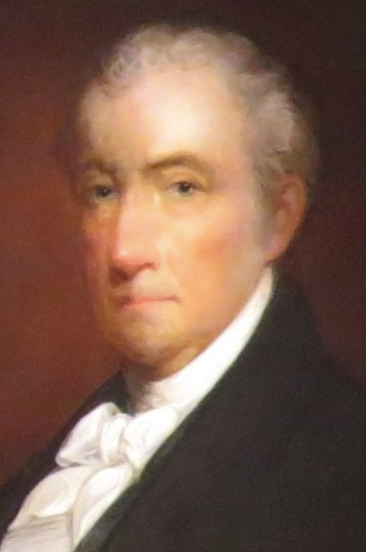
- Gilbert Stuart painted by Jane Stuart, Gilbert Stuart Birthplace
  Ann Willing Bingham – Philadelphia socialite
- Horace Binney – Prominent Philadelphia lawyer
- Elizabeth Bowdoin, Lady Temple – wife of Sir John Temple, first British consul general to United States, 1785
- Hugh Henry Brackenridge – early American writer, Pennsylvania Supreme Court justice, and founder of the University of Pittsburgh
- Jean Baptiste Casmiere Breschard – Performer and theatrical impresario
- Rosalie Stier Calvert – Belgian-born heiress and mother of Charles Benedict Calvert
- Mary Willing Clymer – Philadelphia socialite
- John Singleton Copley – American colonial portraitist
- Thomas Dawes – Early American architect, builder, military leader, politician
- Horatio Gates – American Revolutionary War general
- King George III – King of United Kingdom of Great Britain and Ireland, 1760–1820
- King George IV – King of United Kingdom of Great Britain and Ireland, 1820–30
- John Jay – First Chief Justice of the United States Supreme Court
- Thomas Jefferson – Third President of the United States
- Rufus King – a signer of United States Constitution
- Robert Kingsmill – Admiral in Royal Navy during American and French Revolutionary Wars
- King Louis XVI – King of France, 1774–92
- James Madison – Fourth President of the United States
- Samuel Miles – Revolutionary War General and Philadelphia mayor
- James Monroe – Fifth President of the United States
- Daniel Pinckney Parker – Prominent Boston merchant
- John Randolph of Roanoke – Virginia congressman and senator
- Joshua Reynolds – English artist
- Henry Rice – Boston merchant and Massachusetts state legislator
- John Tayloe III – Virginia planter, builder of The Octagon House in Washington, DC.
- Thomas Townshend, 1st Viscount Sydney – the cities of Sydney in New South Wales and Sydney, Nova Scotia are named in his honor
- John Trumbull – artist during the period of the American Revolutionary War
- George Washington – First President of the United States
- Martha Washington – First Lady of the United States, wife of George Washington
- Benjamin West – American painter
- John FitzGibbon, 1st Earl of Clare – Attorney General and Lord Chancellor of Ireland
- Catherine Brass Yates – Philadelphia socialite
- John Bill Ricketts – Equestrian, leader of Ricketts' Circus in Philadelphia
- Elisabeth Merry – Wife of Anthony Merry 1805.

== Portrait gallery ==
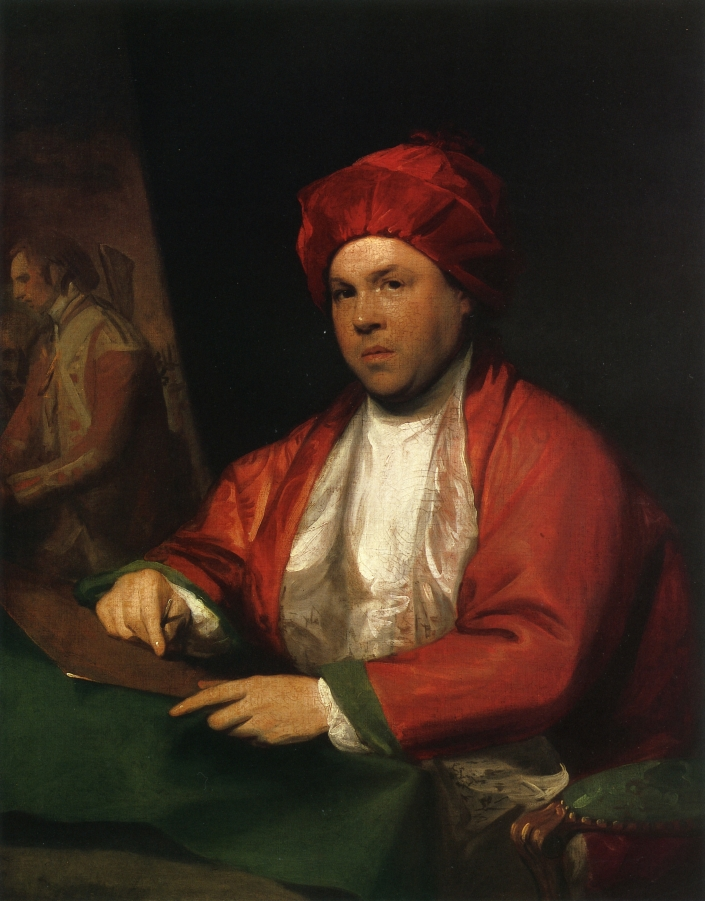
Portrait of William Woollett, 1783

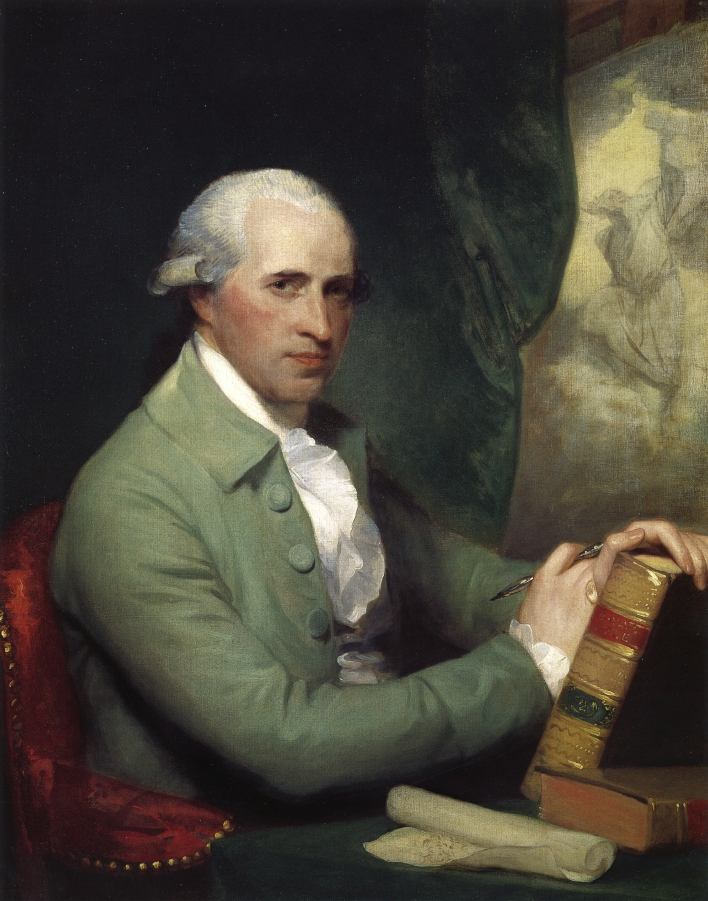
Portrait of Benjamin West, 1783–84

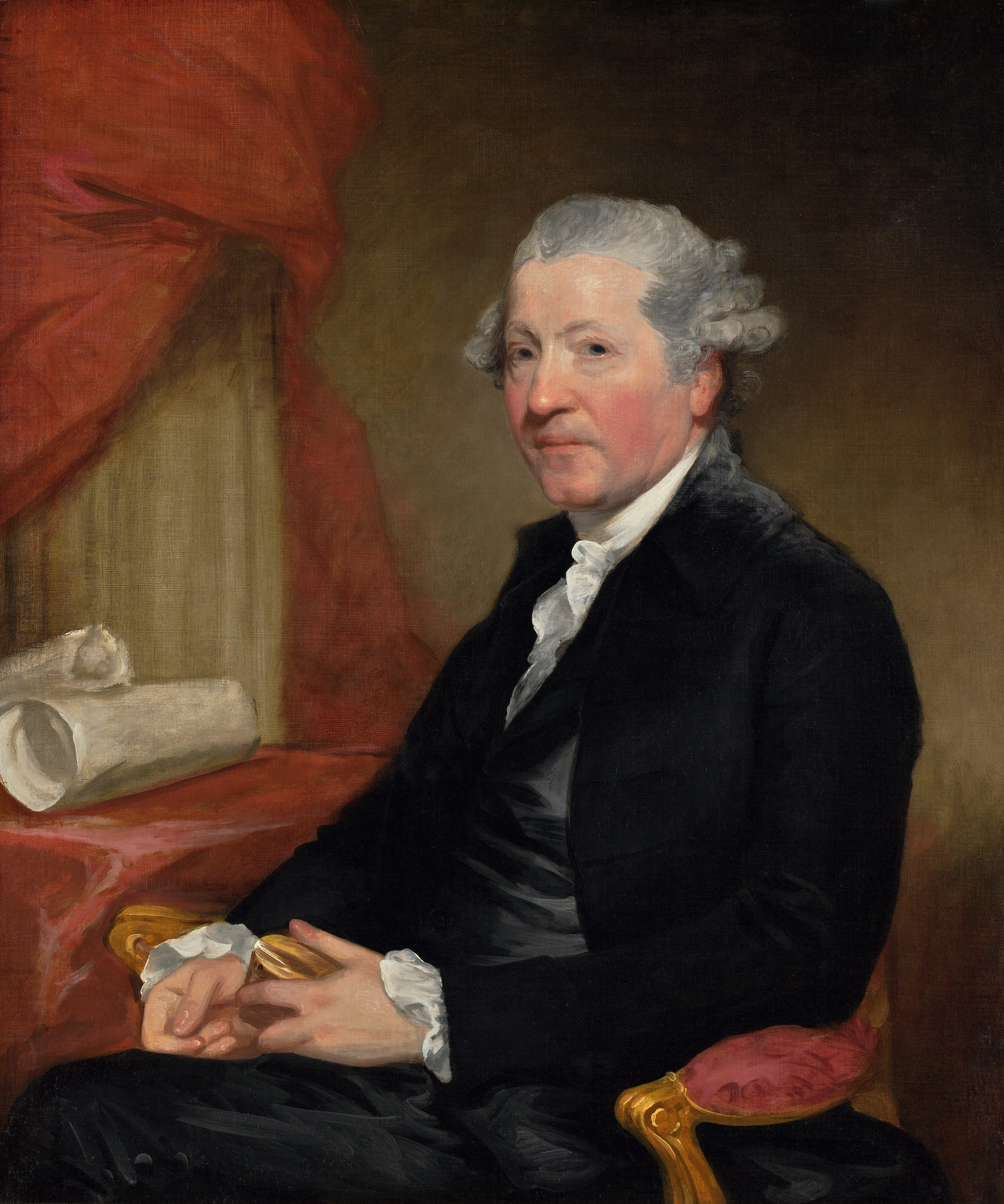
Portrait of Joshua Reynolds, 1784

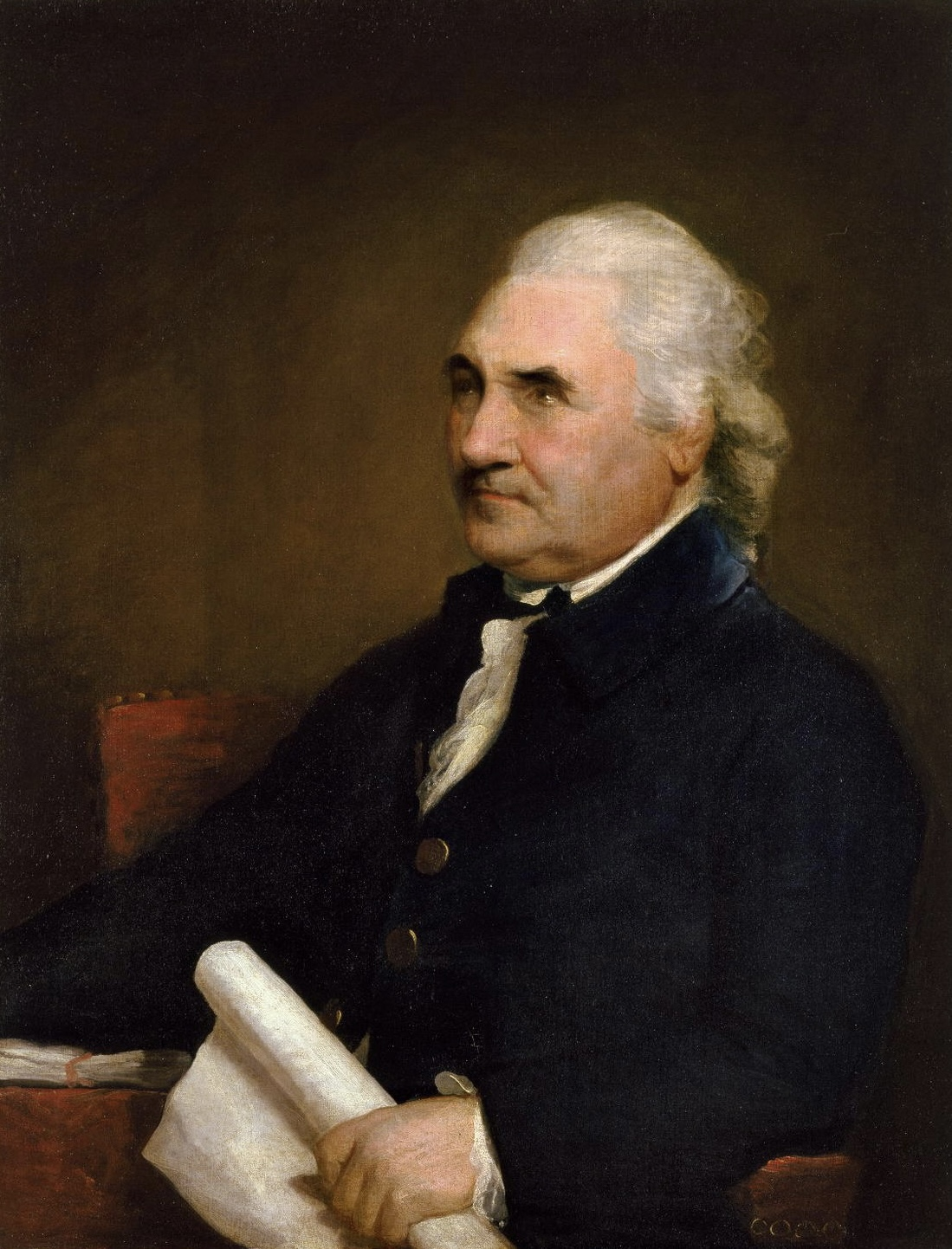
Portrait of Isaac Barré, 1785

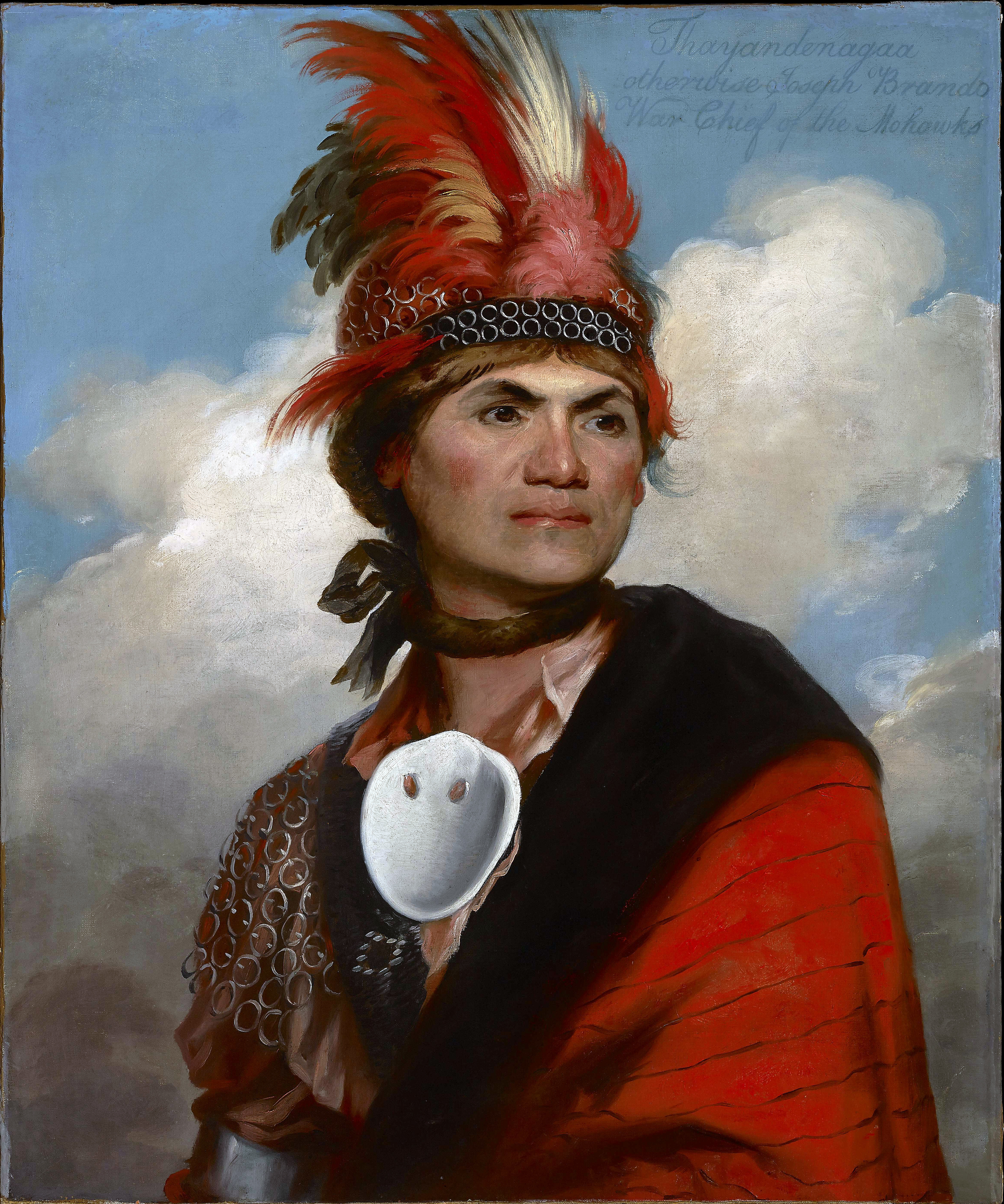
Mohawk leader Joseph Brant, 1785, British Museum, London

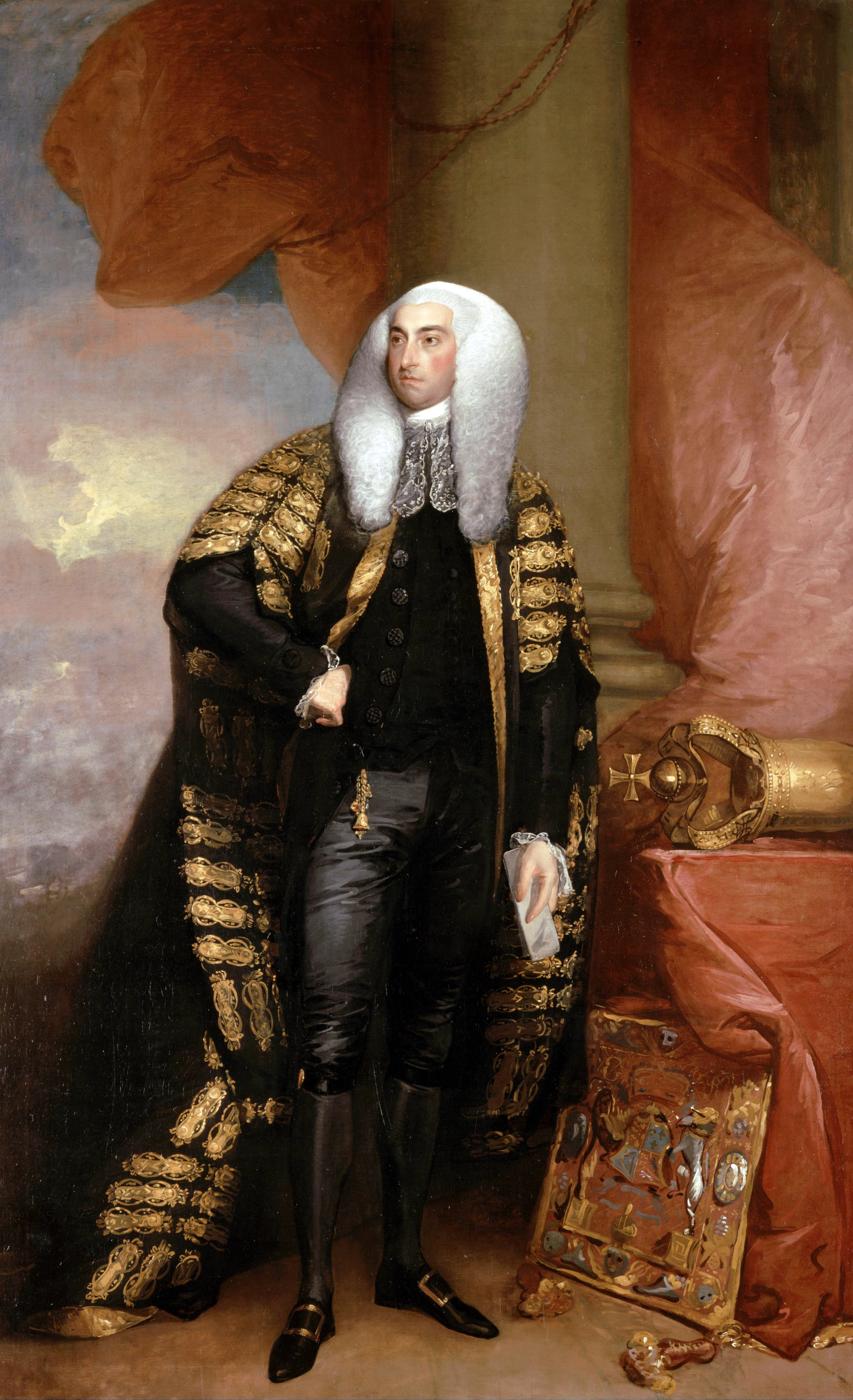
Portrait of the Earl of Clare, 1789

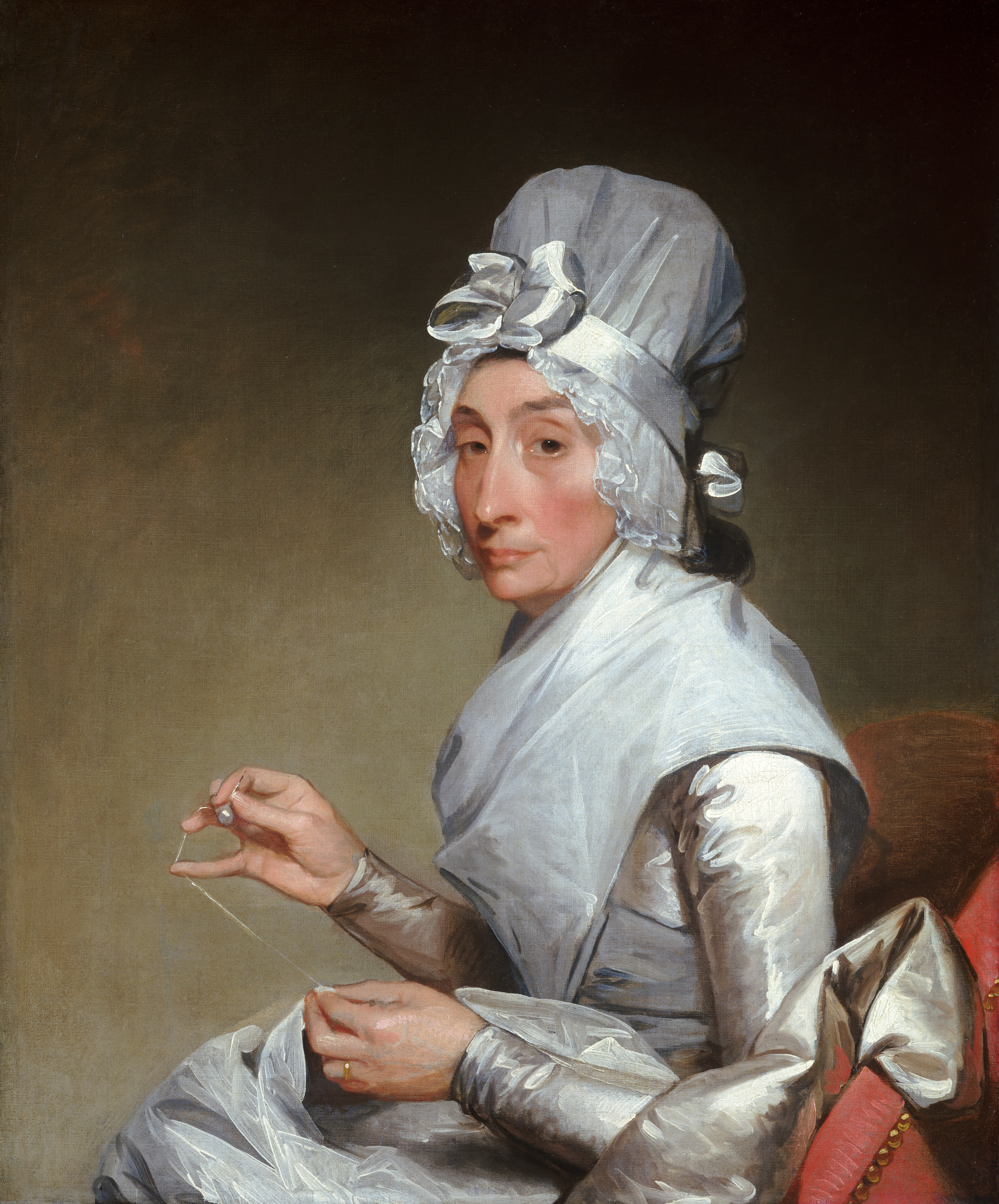
Portrait of Catherine Brass Yates 1793–94

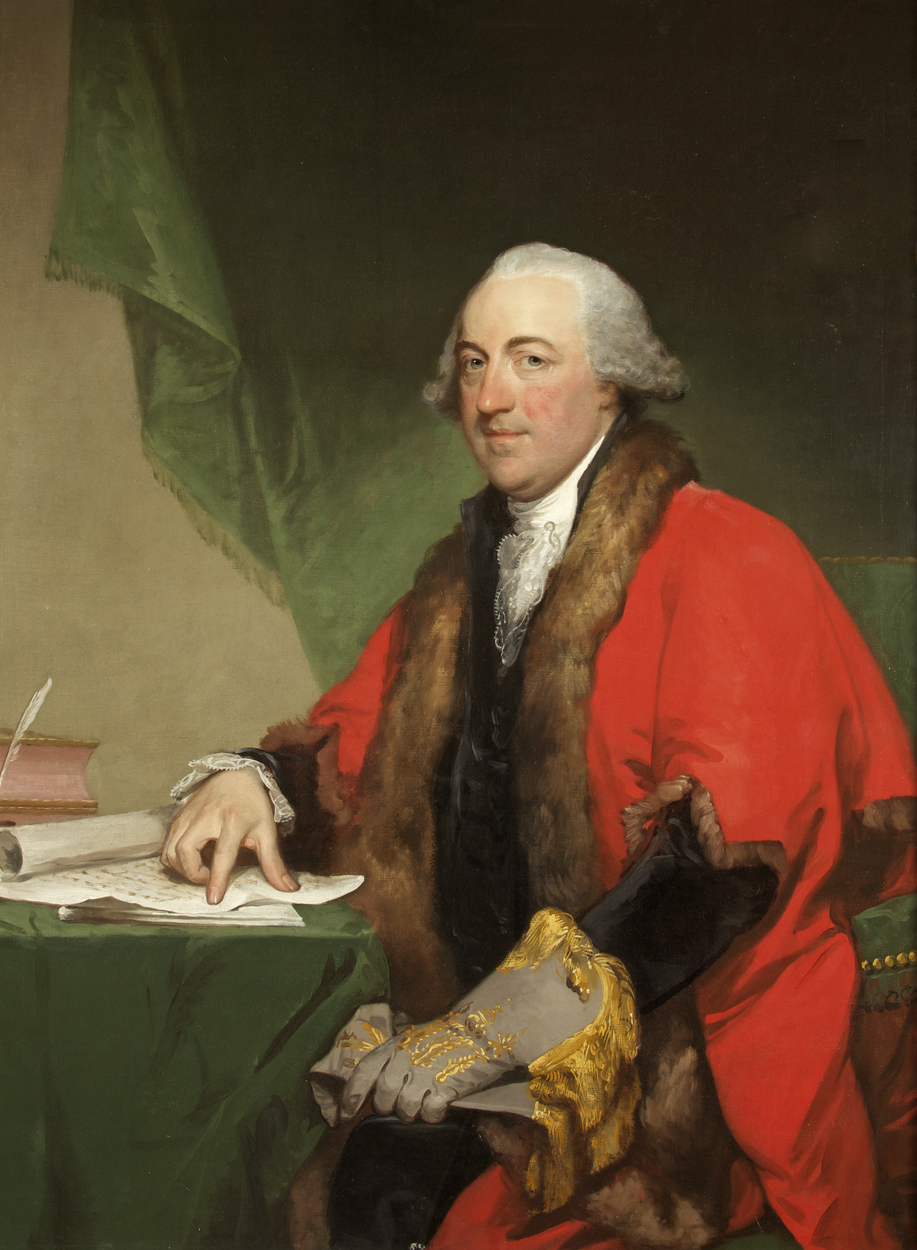
Portrait of Henry Cruger, 1794

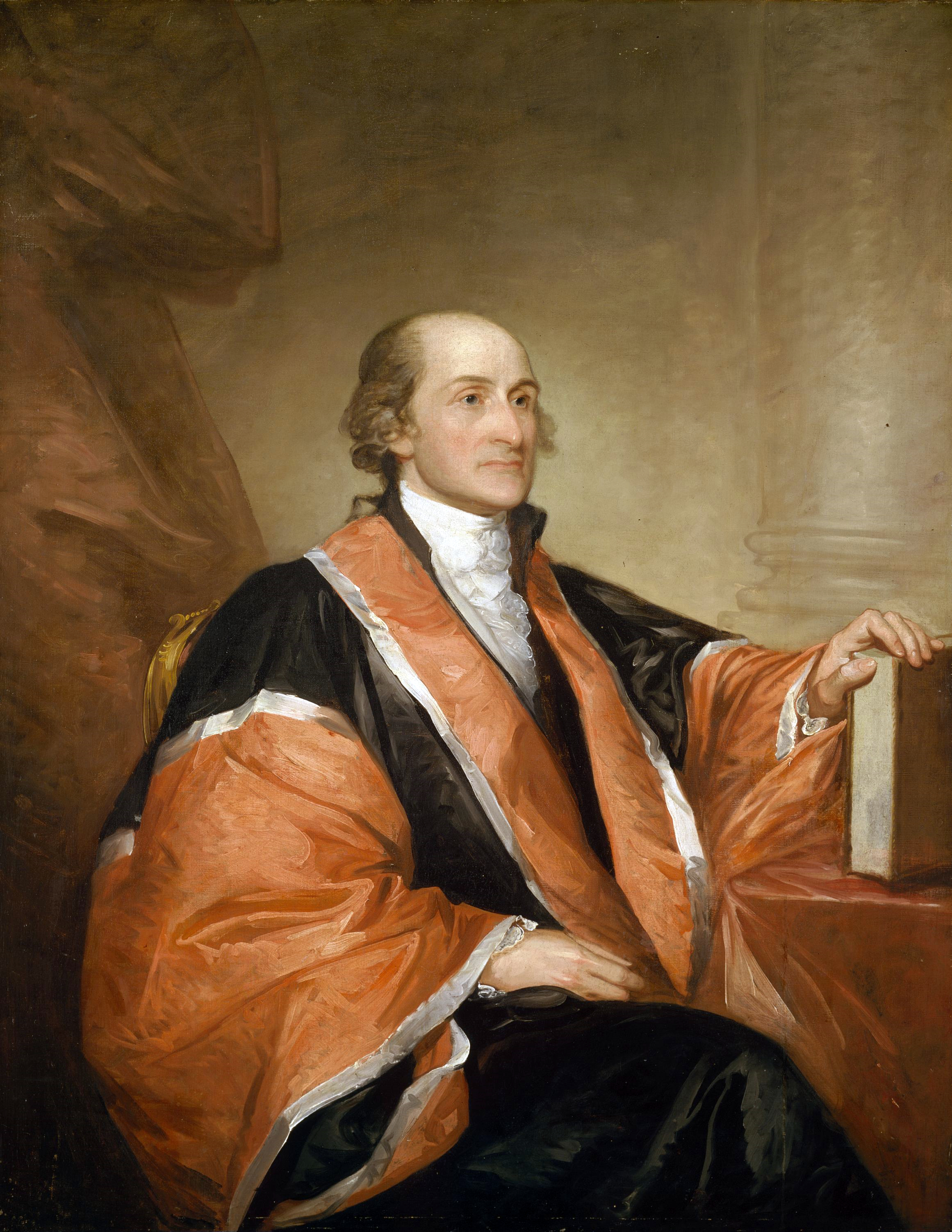
Portrait of John Jay, 1794, First Chief Justice of the United States Supreme Court

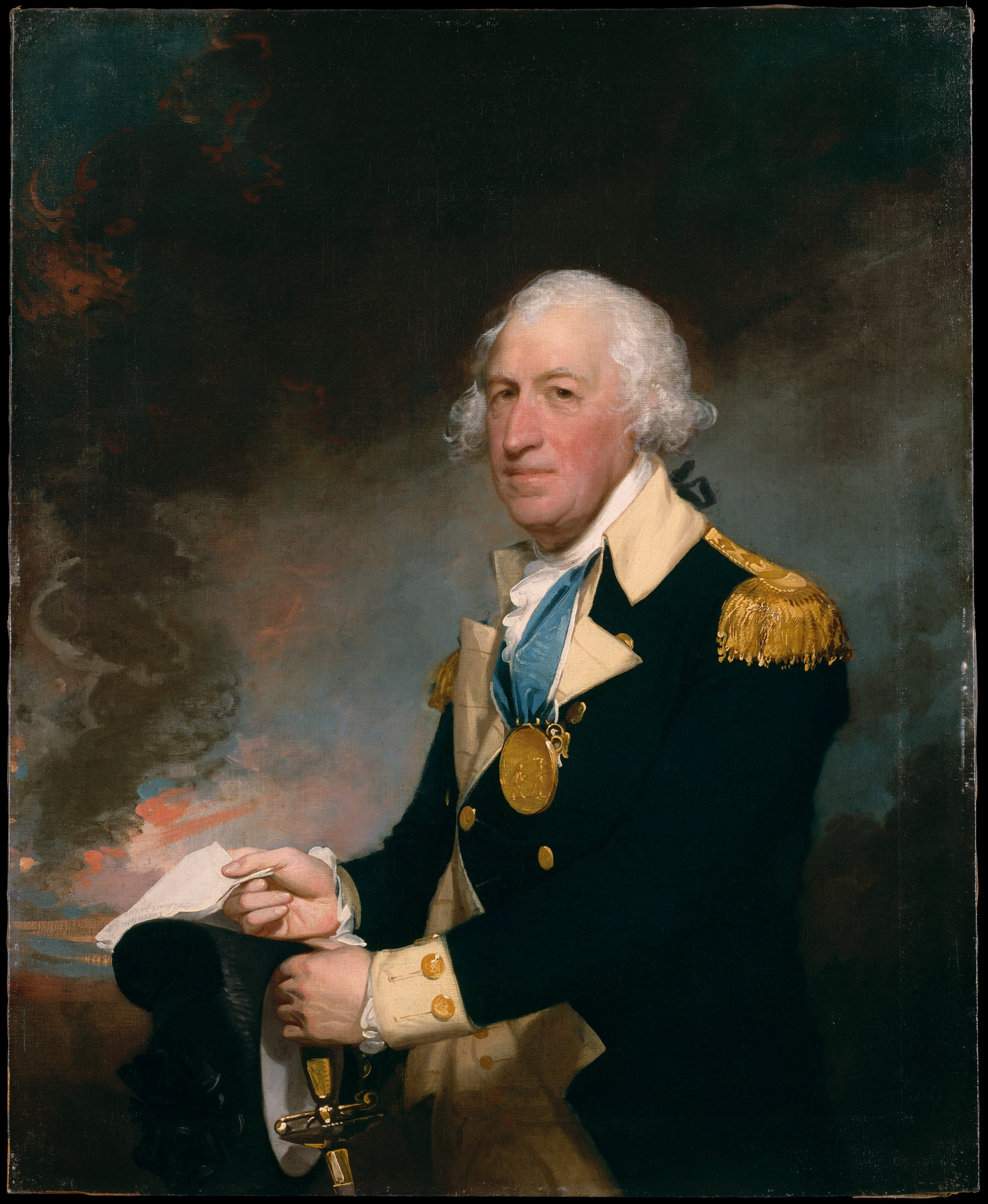
Portrait of Horatio Gates, 1794, Metropolitan Museum of Art

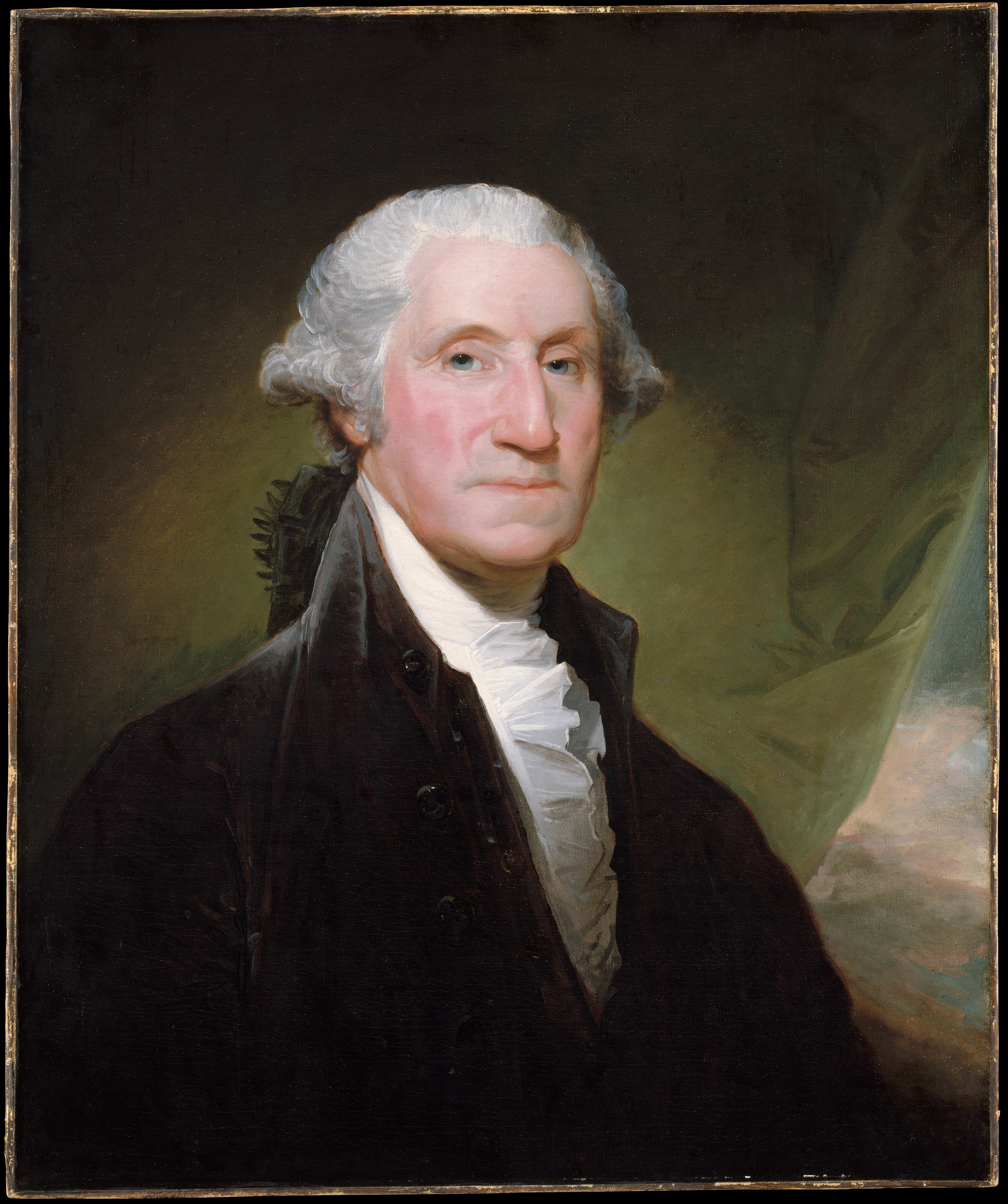
Gibbs-Channing-Avery Portrait, 1795, Metropolitan Museum of Art New York City

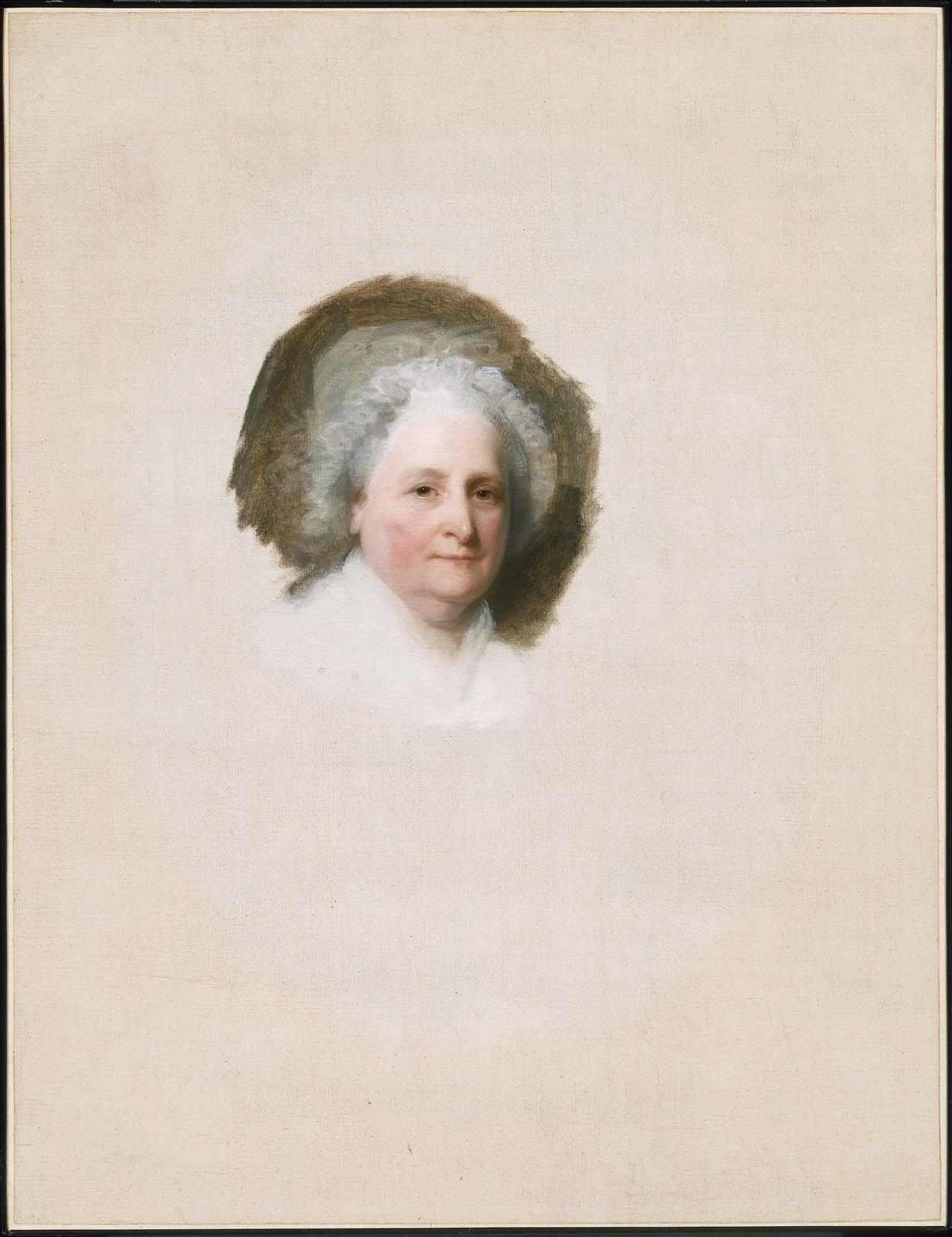
Martha Washington, c. 1796

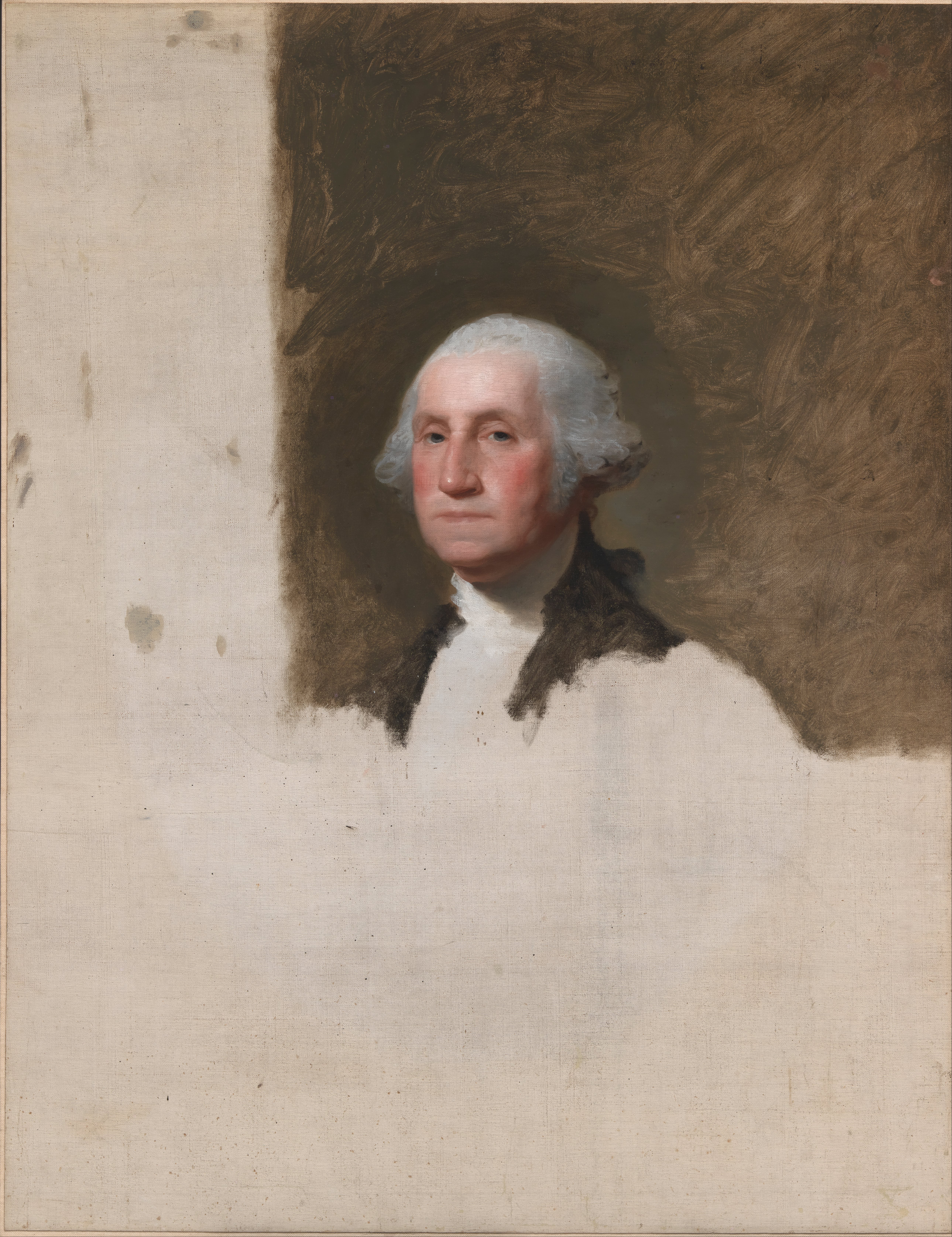
Stuart's unfinished 1796 painting of George Washington, also known as the Athenaeum Portrait, his most celebrated and famous work

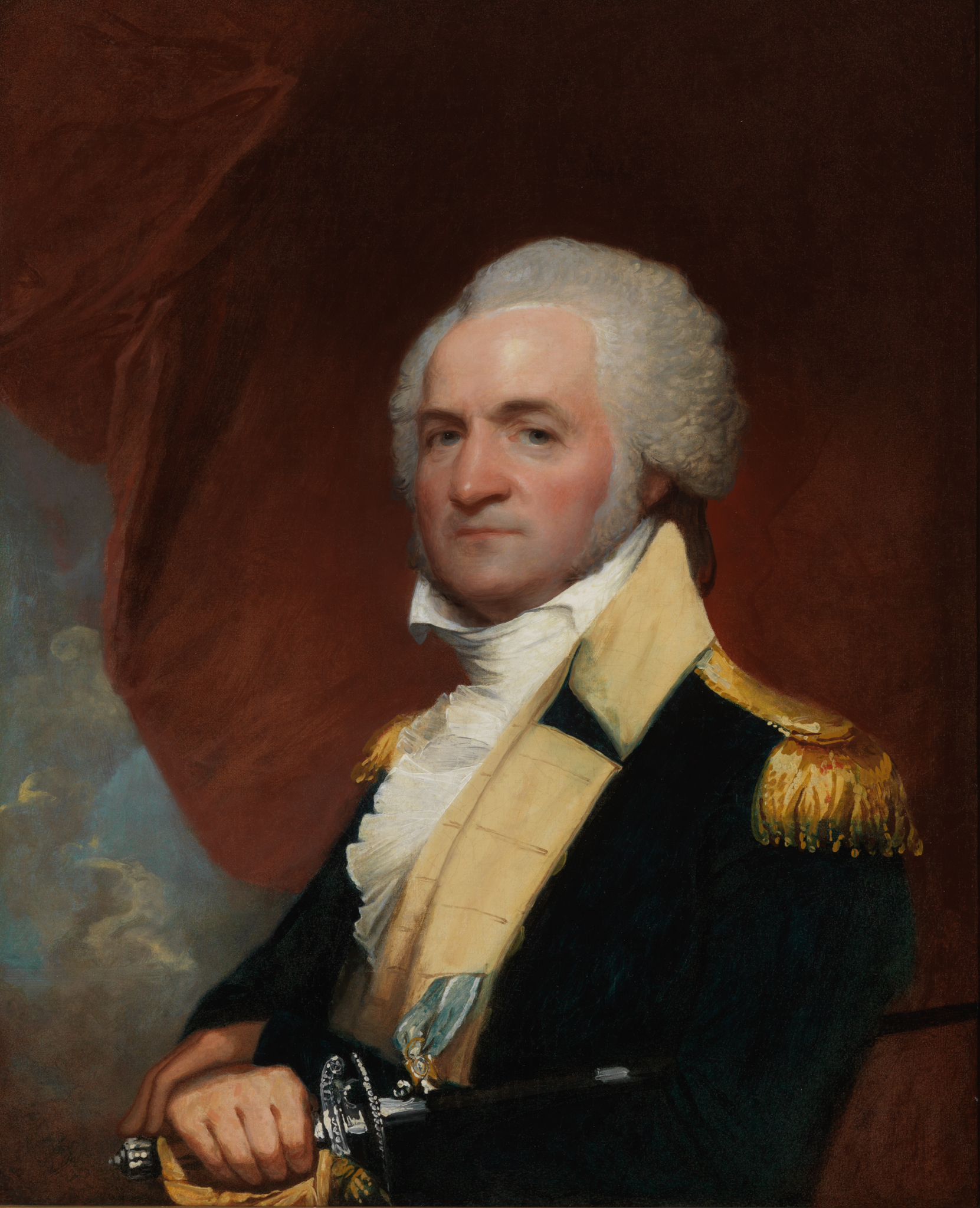
Winthrop Sargent, c. 1799–1805

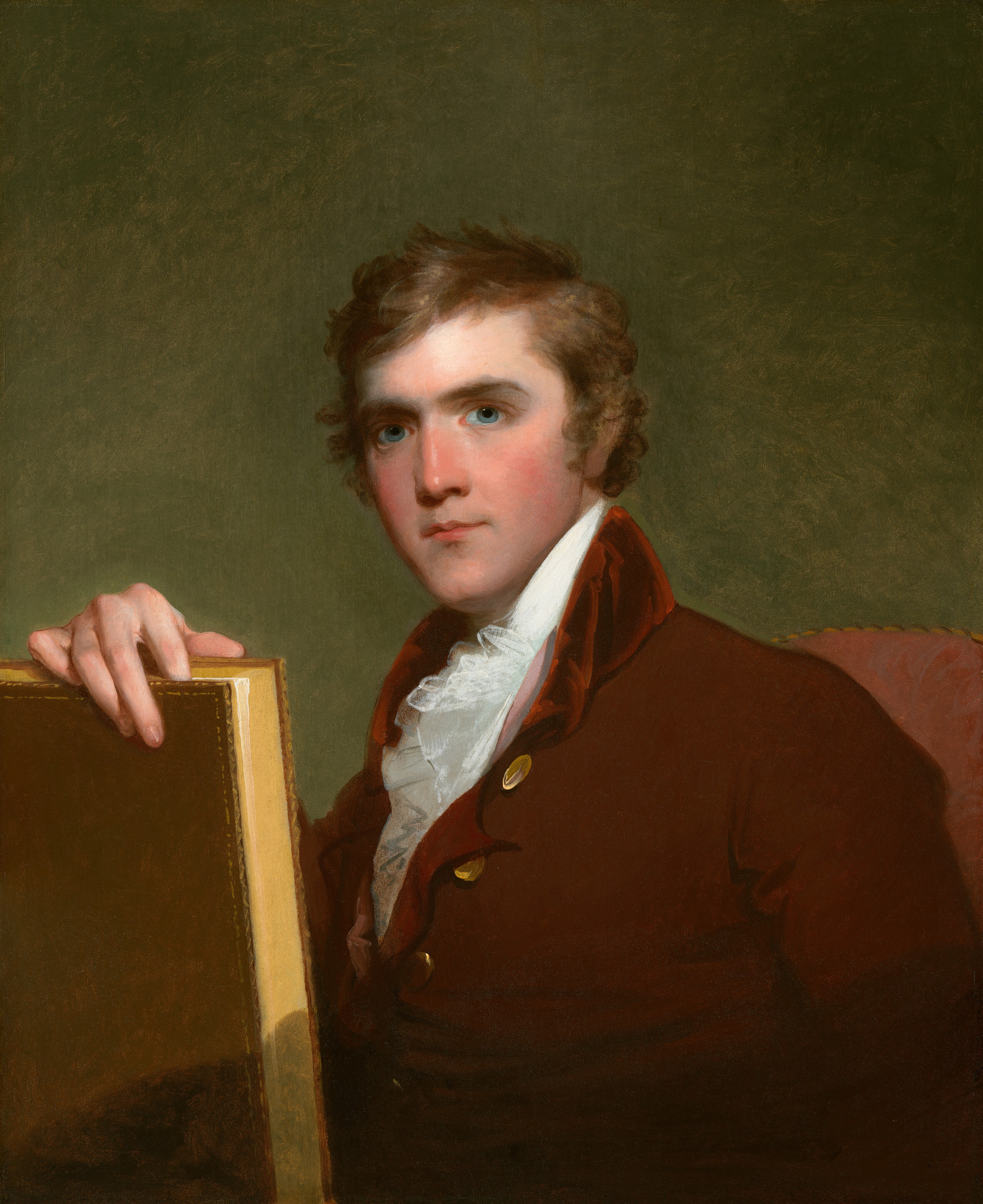
Horace Binney, c. 1800

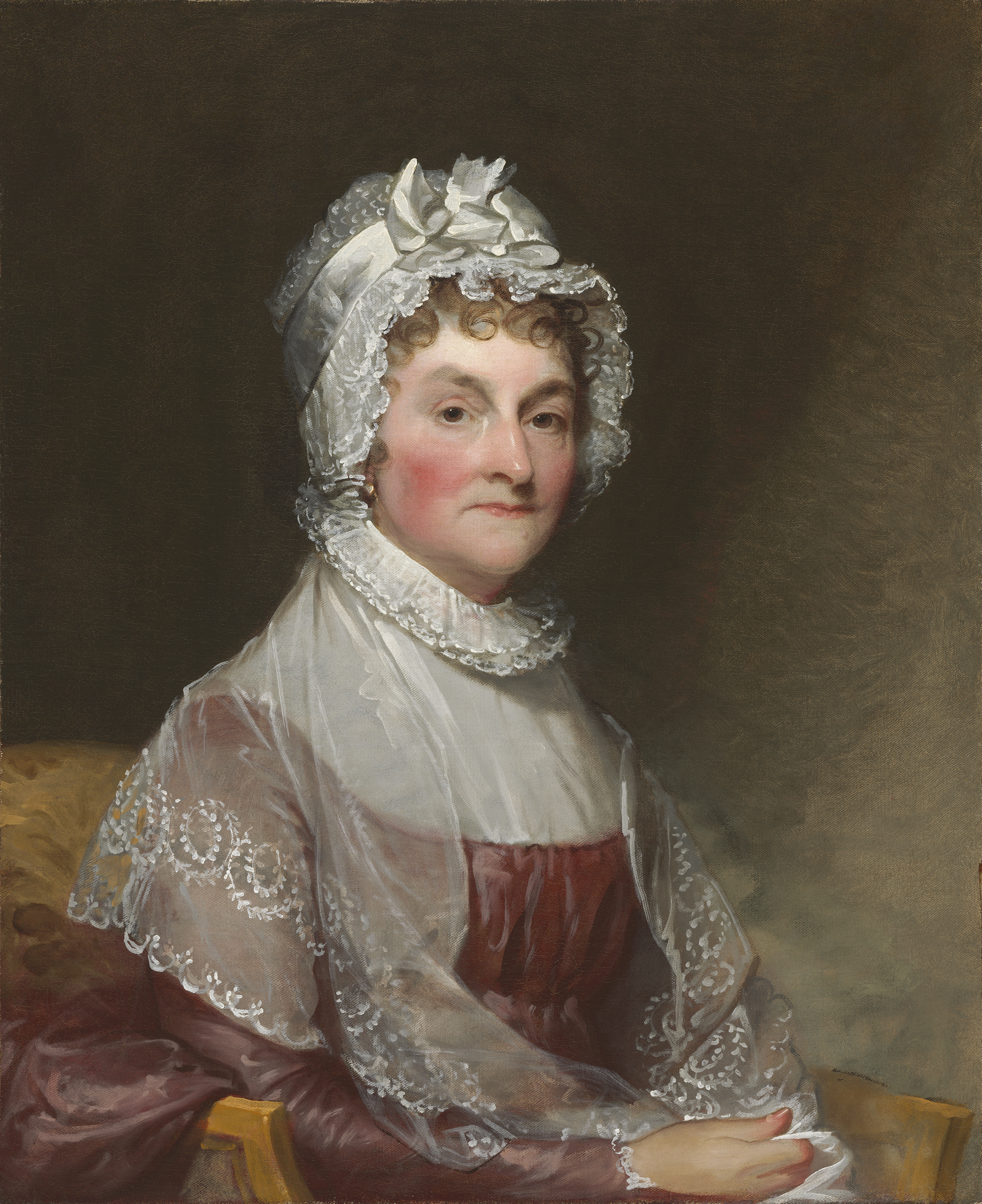
The second First Lady of the United States, Abigail Adams, c. 1800–1815

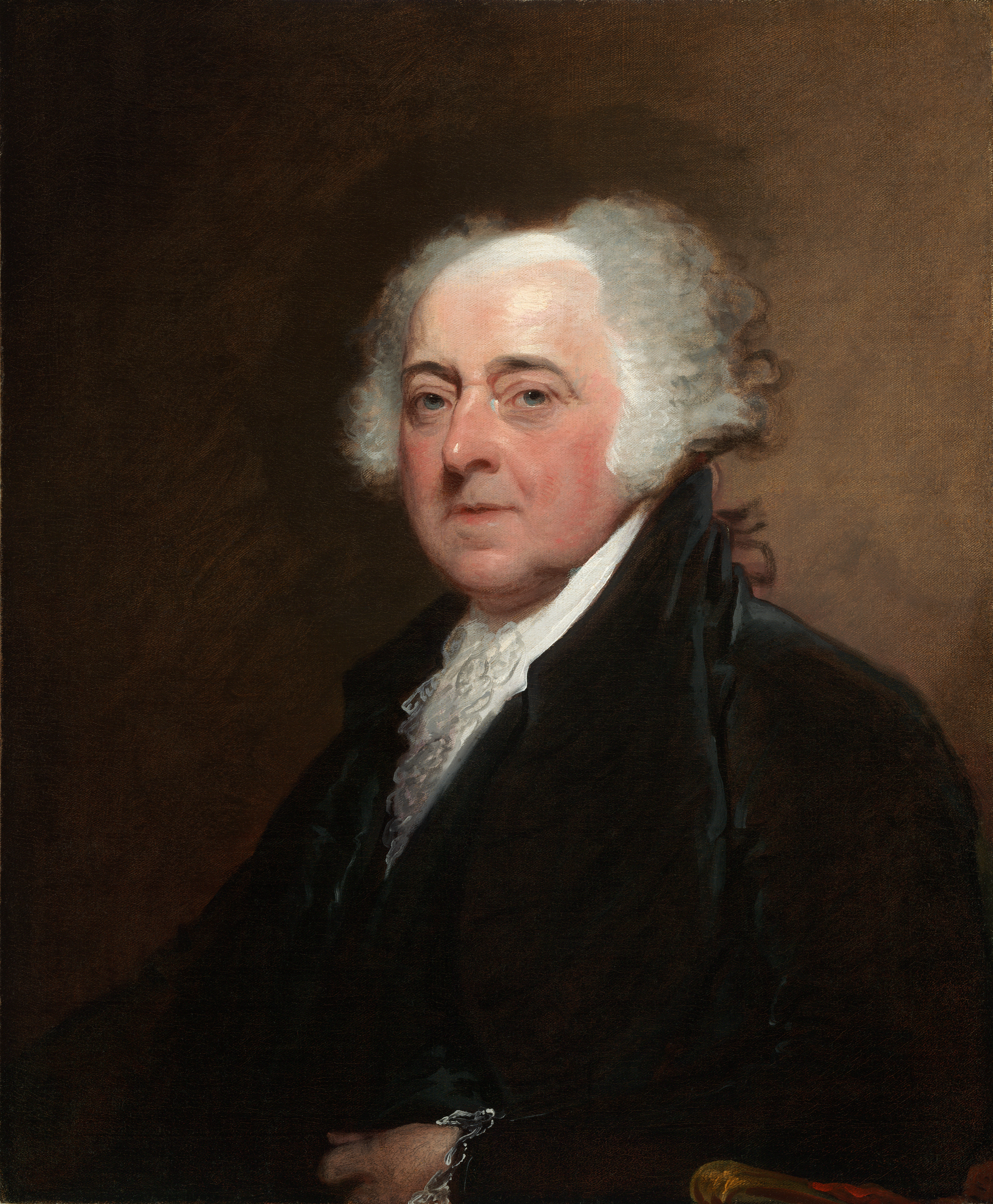
The second President of the United States, John Adams c. 1800–1815

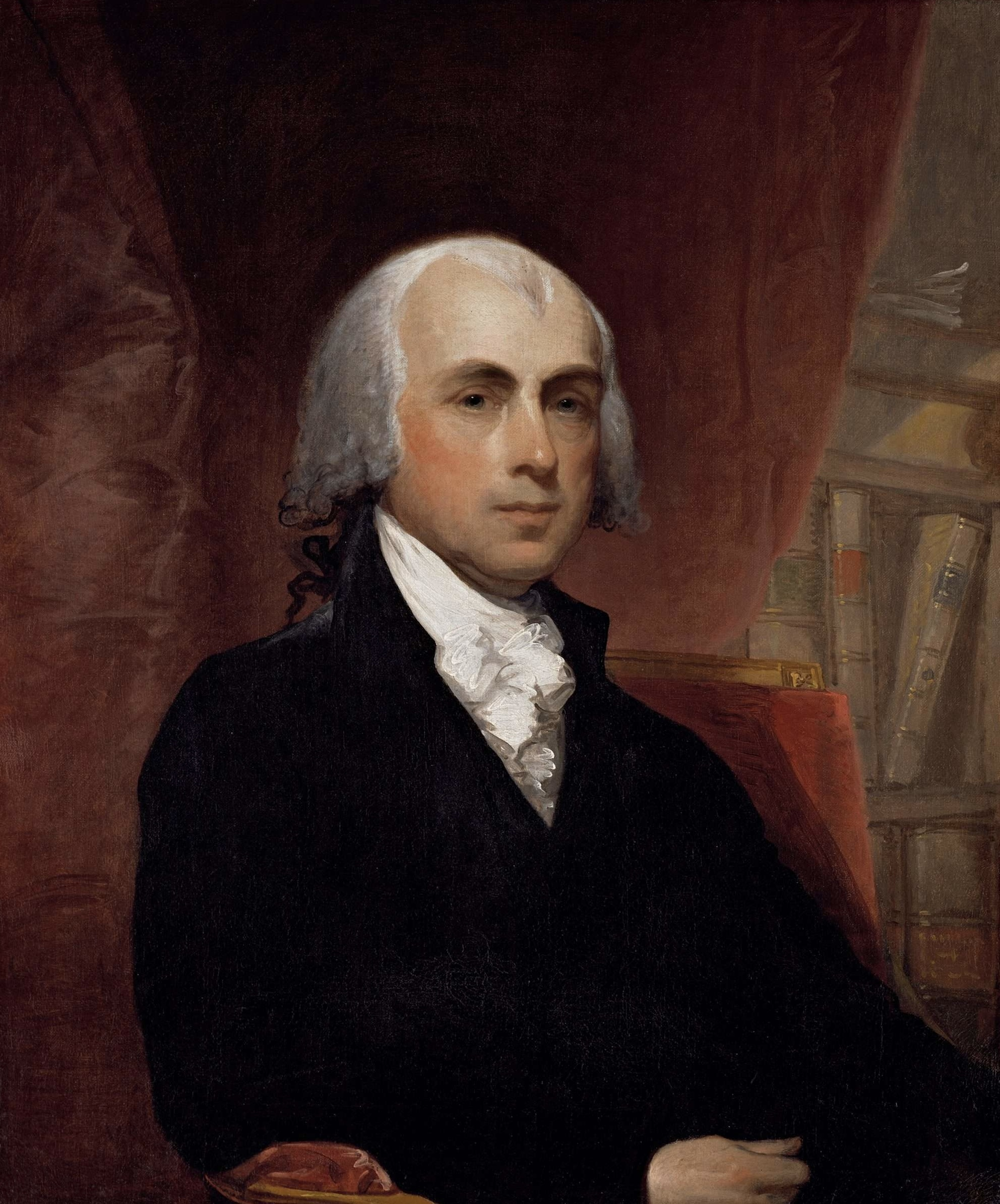
The fourth President of the United States, James Madison, 1804, Bowdoin College Museum of Art

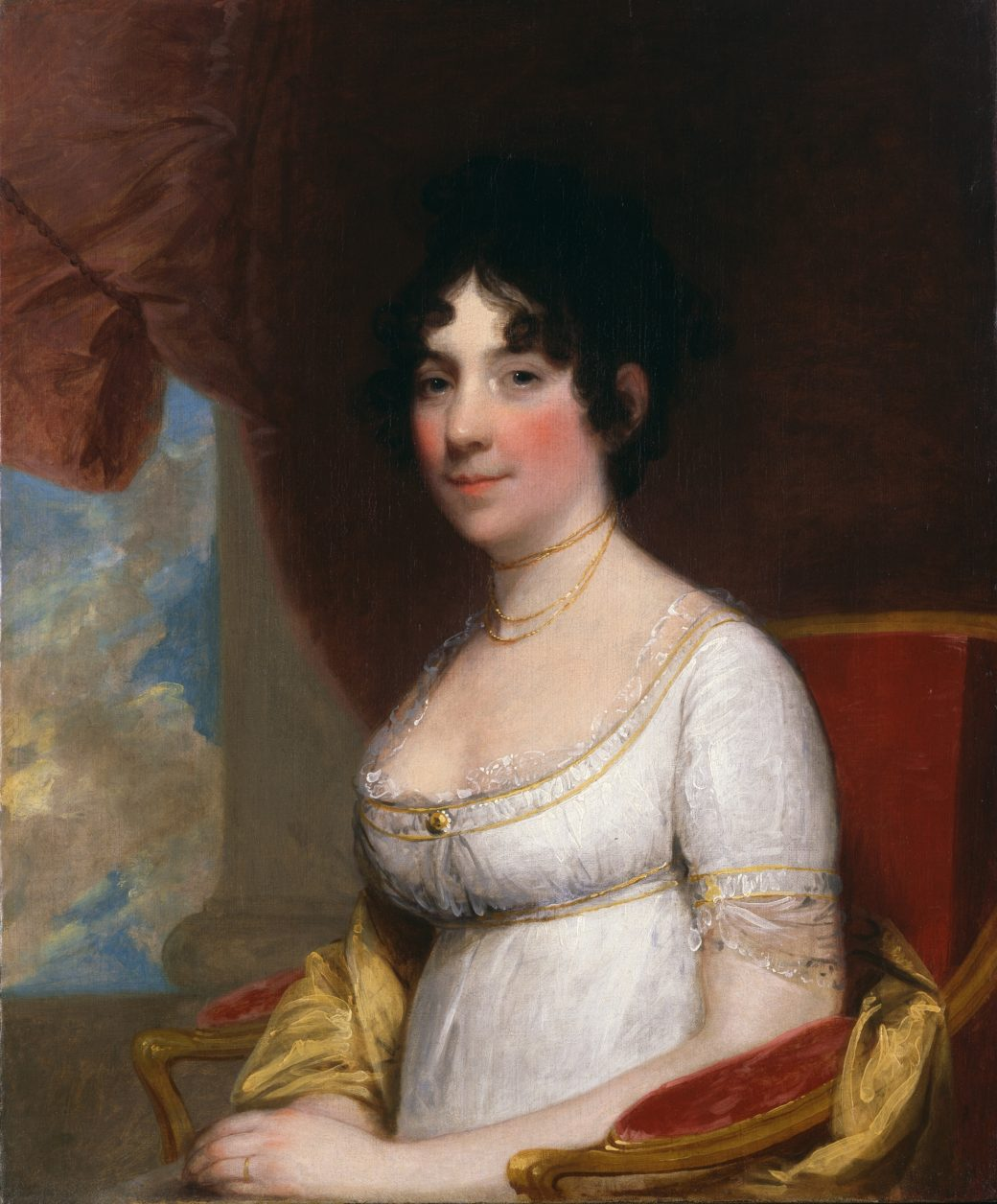
Portrait of Dolley Madison, 1804

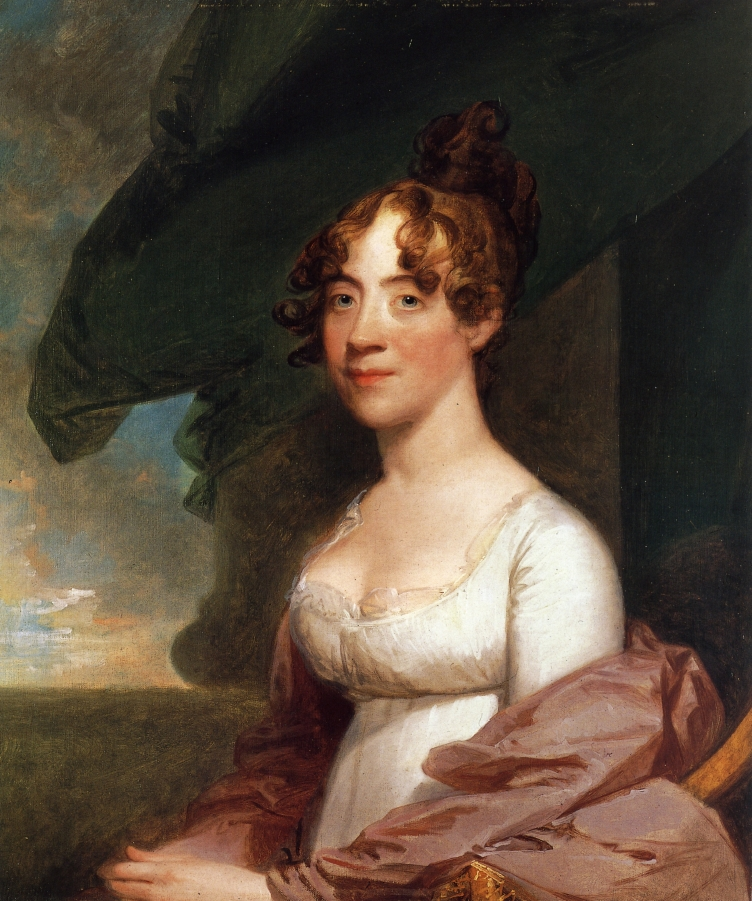
Anna Payne Cutts, sister of First Lady Dolley Madison, 1804, The White House

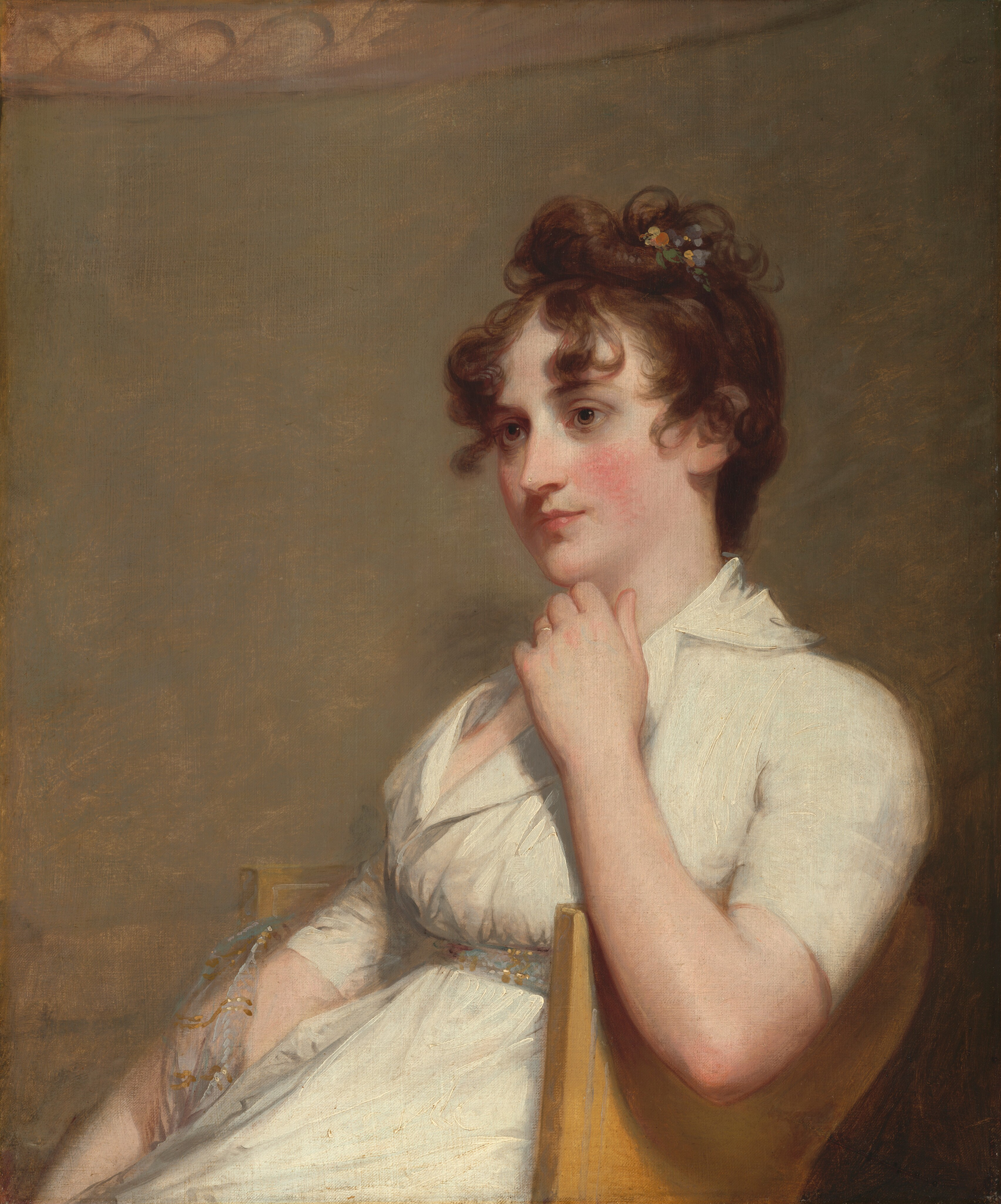
Eleanor Parke Custis Lewis, c. 1804

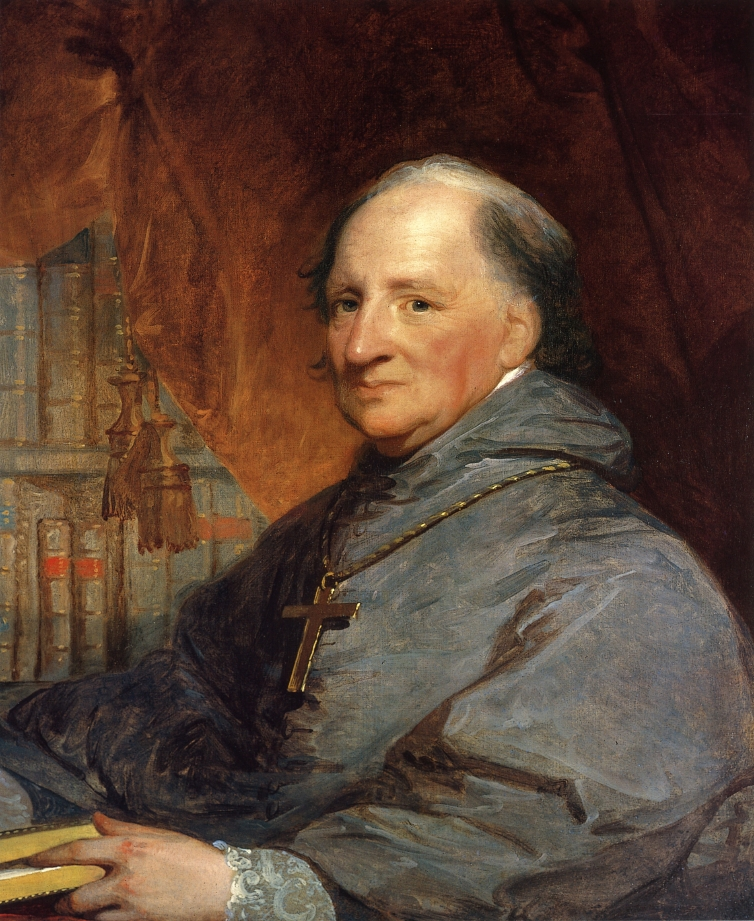
John Carroll, first Catholic bishop of the United States, c. 1804, Georgetown University Art Collection, Washington, D.C.

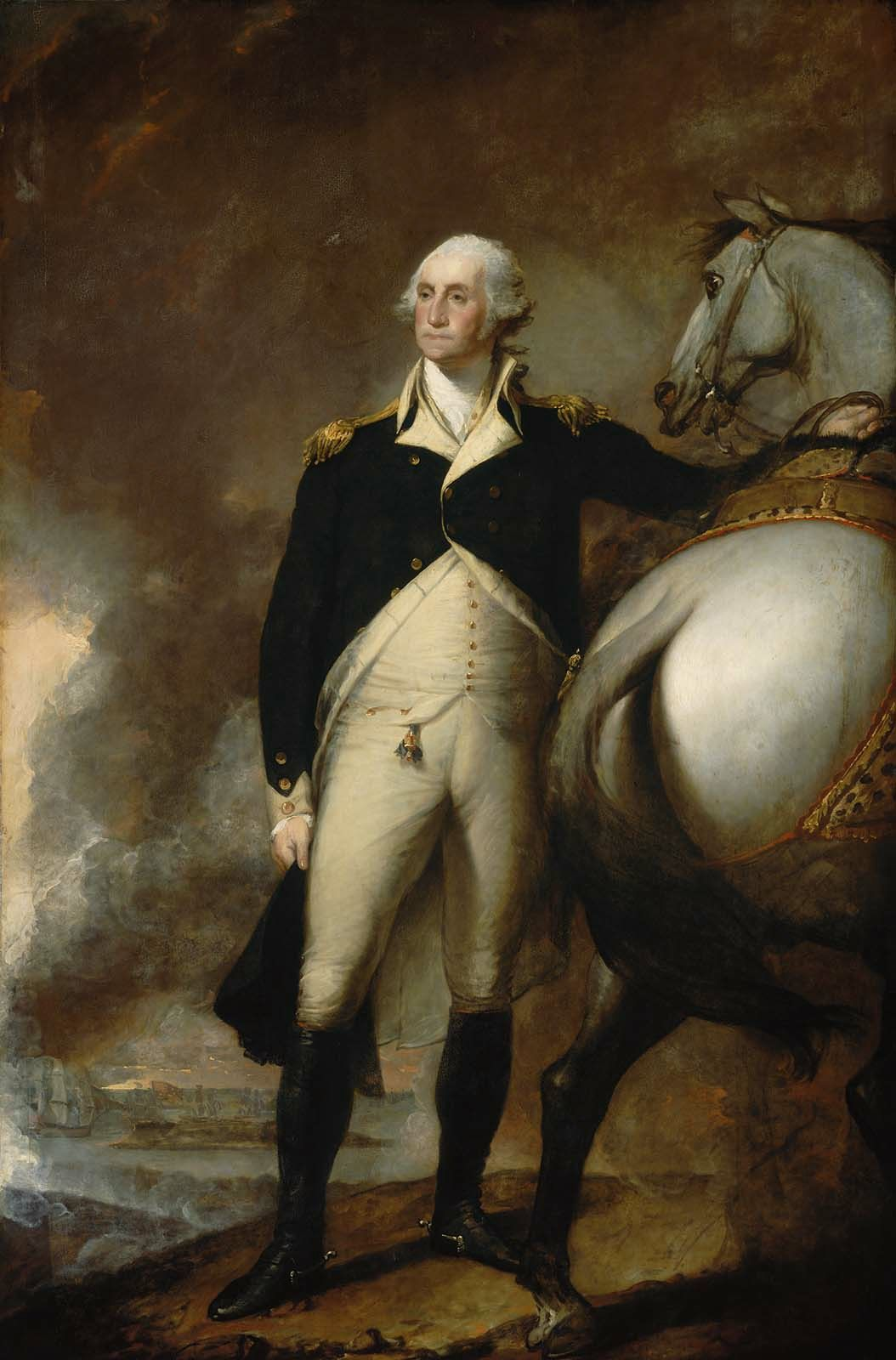
George Washington At Dorchester Heights, 1806, Boston Museum of Fine Arts

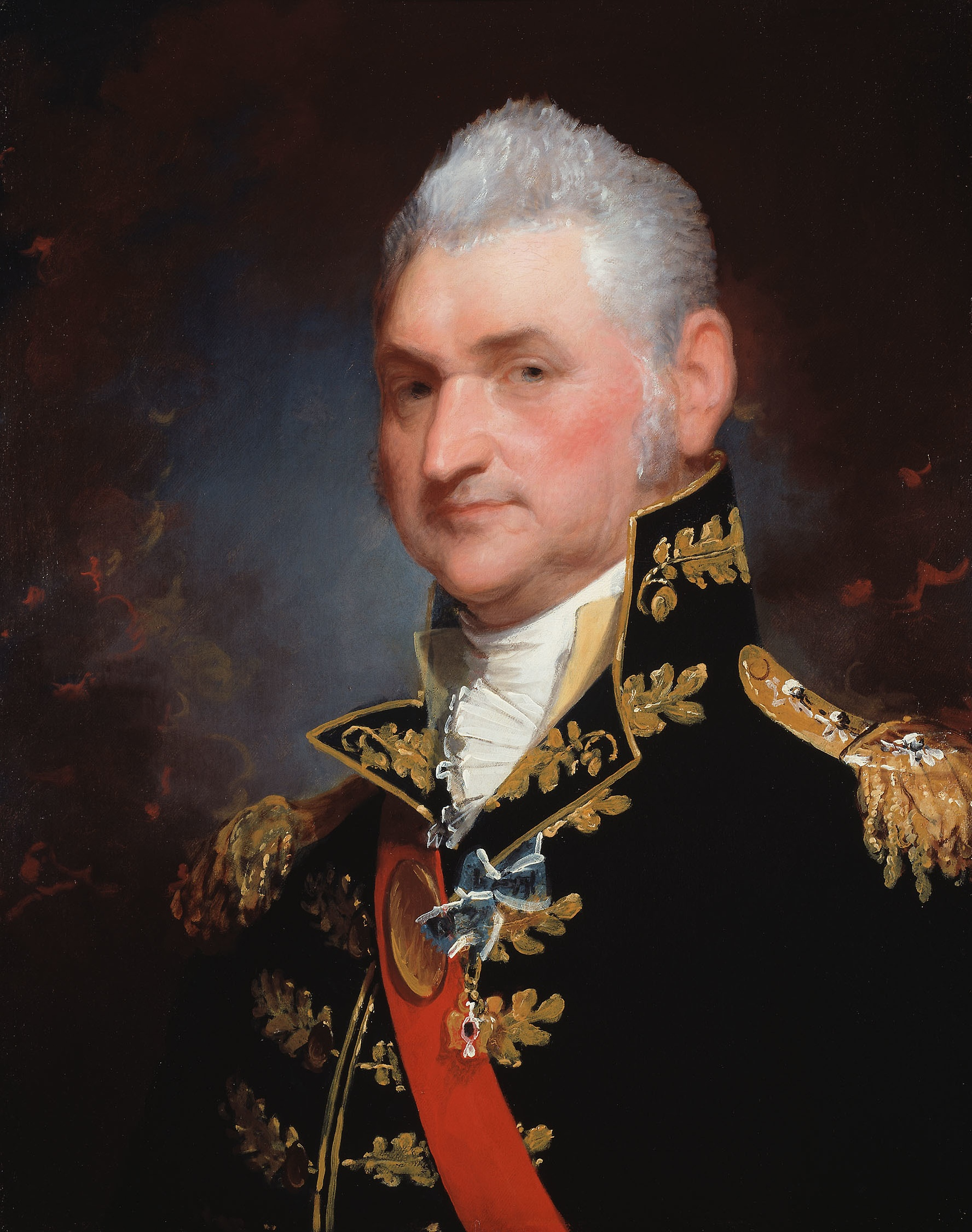
Portrait of Henry Dearborn, c. 1812

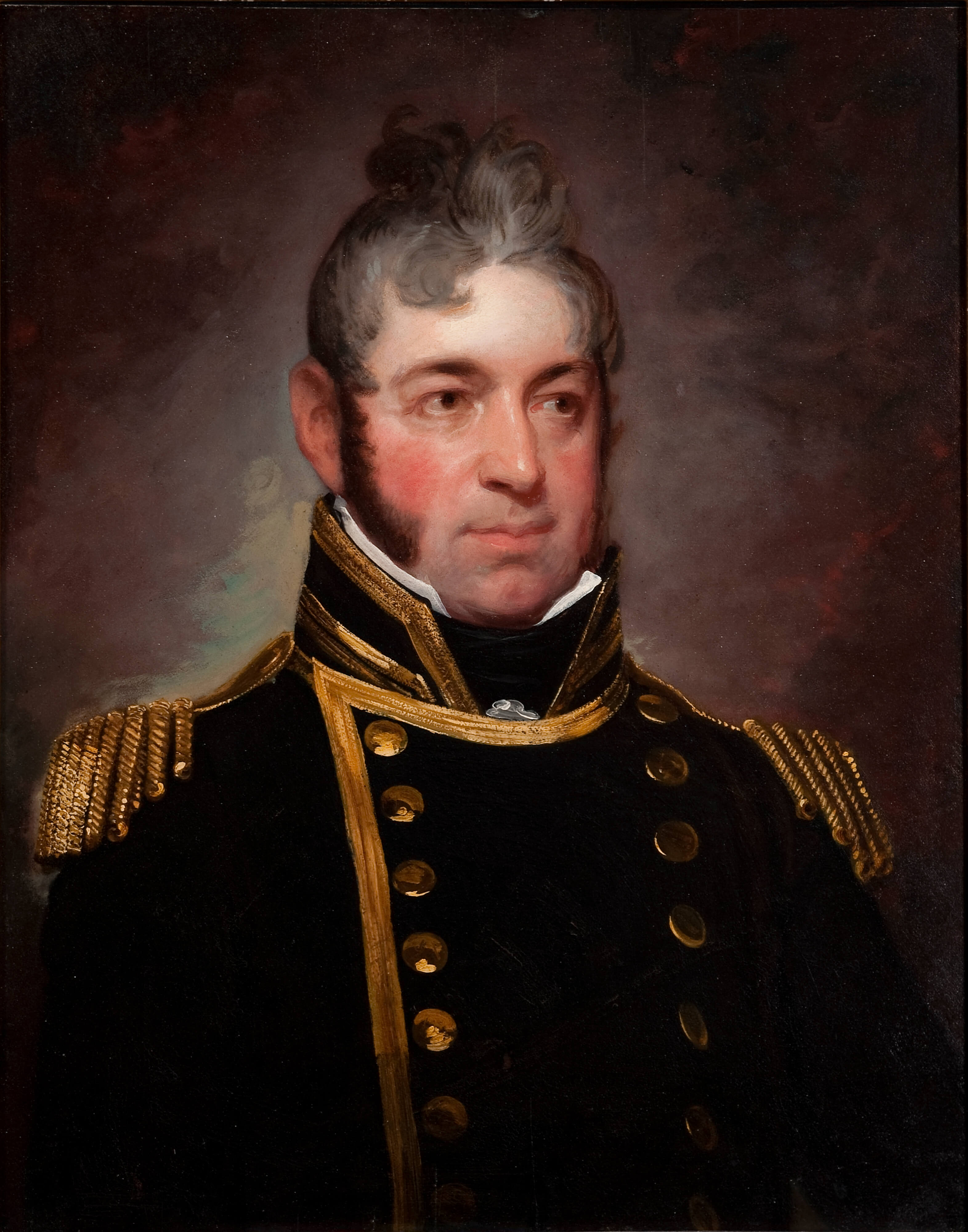
William Bainbridge, c. 1813

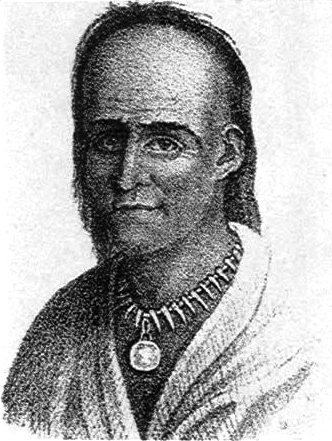
This lithograph of Little Turtle is reputedly based upon a lost portrait by Gilbert Stuart that was destroyed when the British burned Washington in 1814.

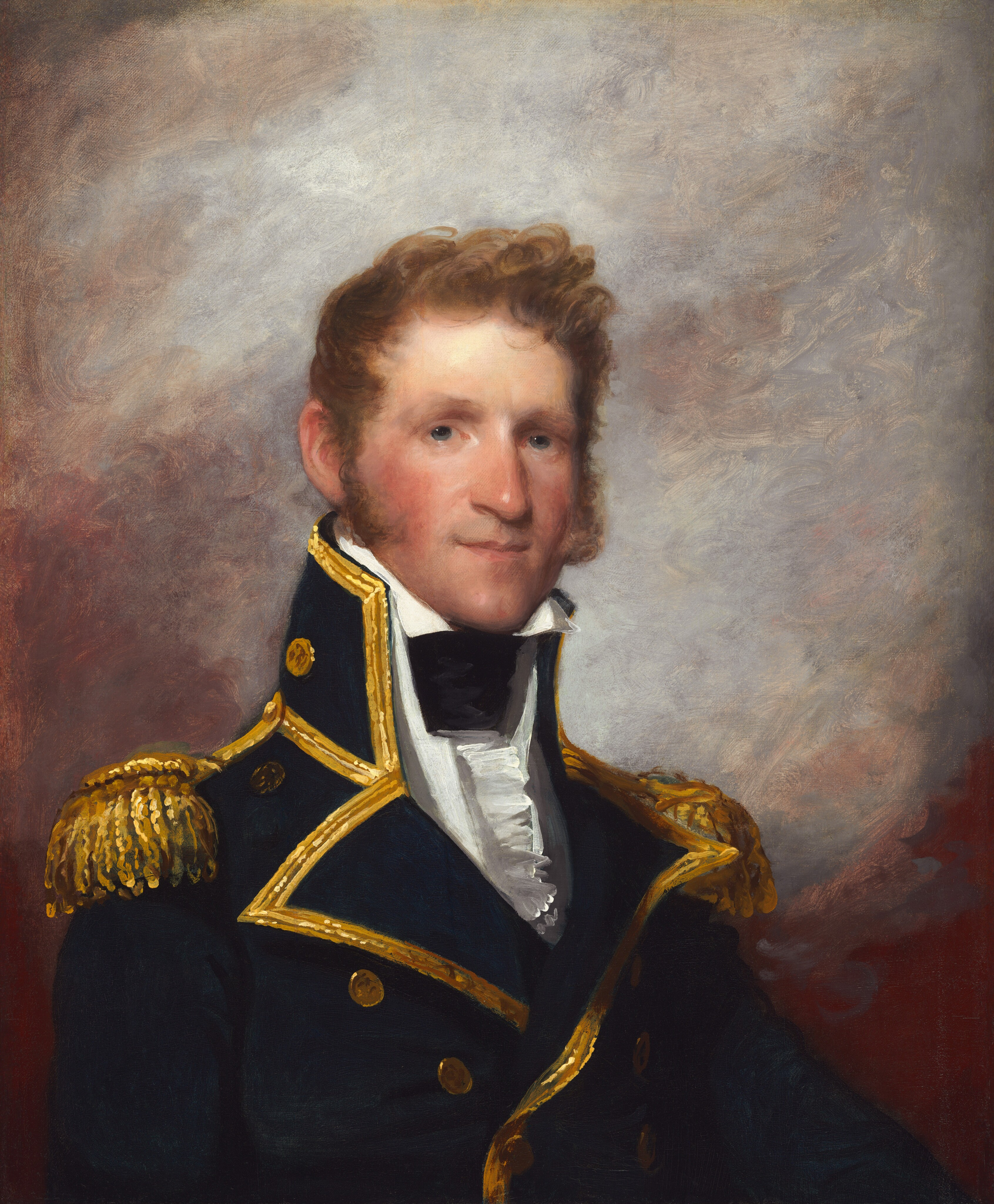
Thomas Macdonough, c. 1815–1818

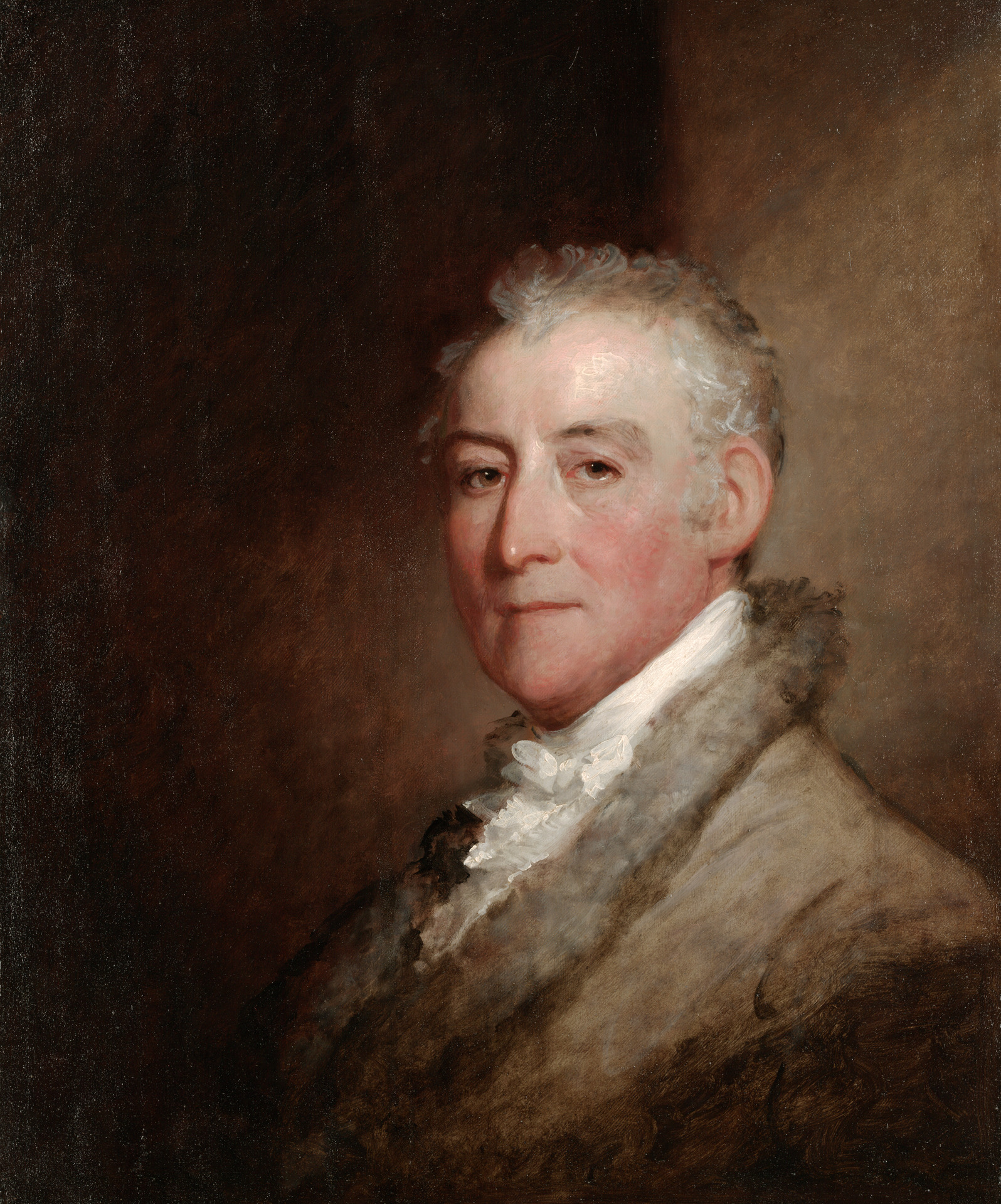
American artist John Trumbull, c. 1818

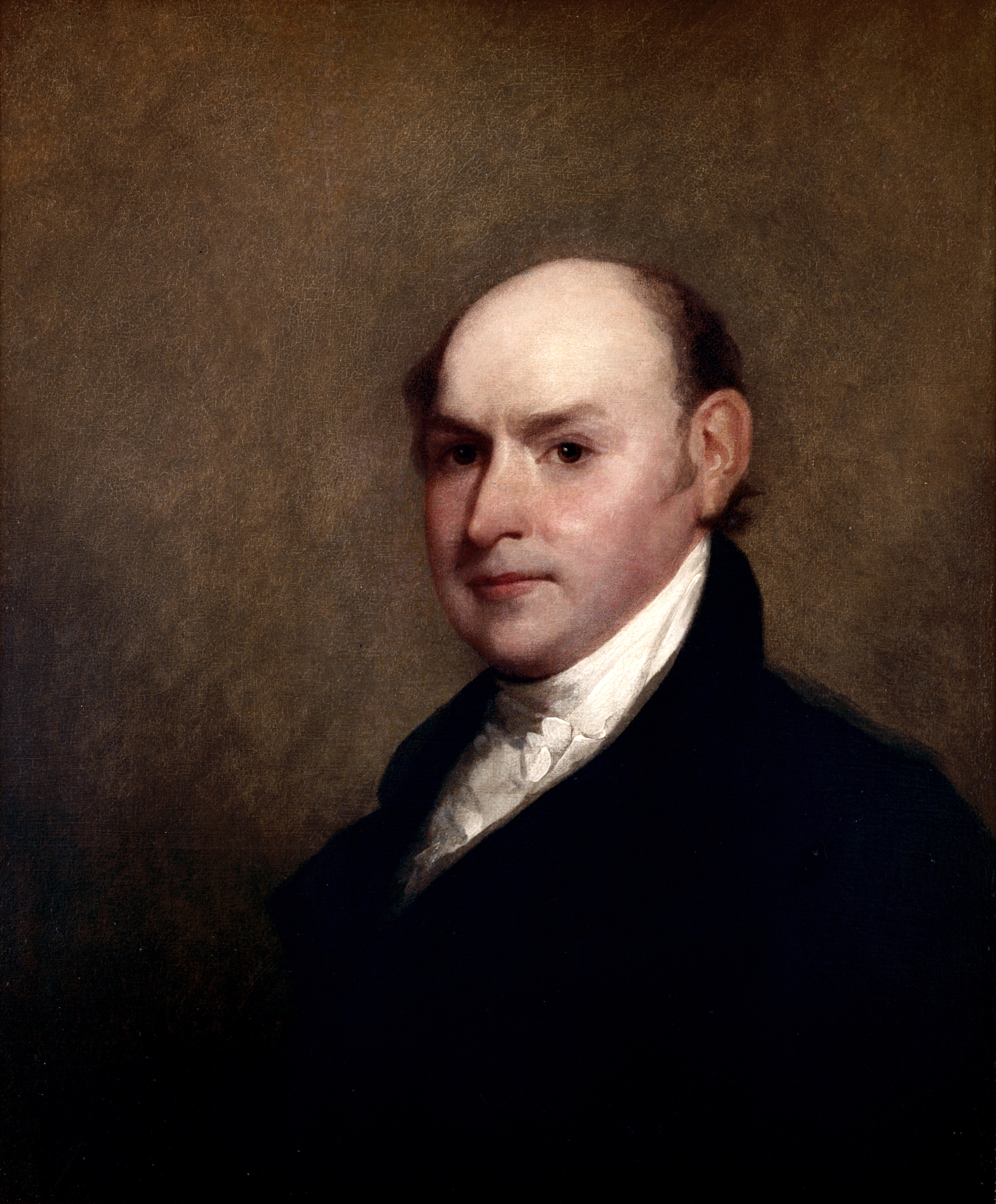
The sixth President of the United States, John Quincy Adams, 1818

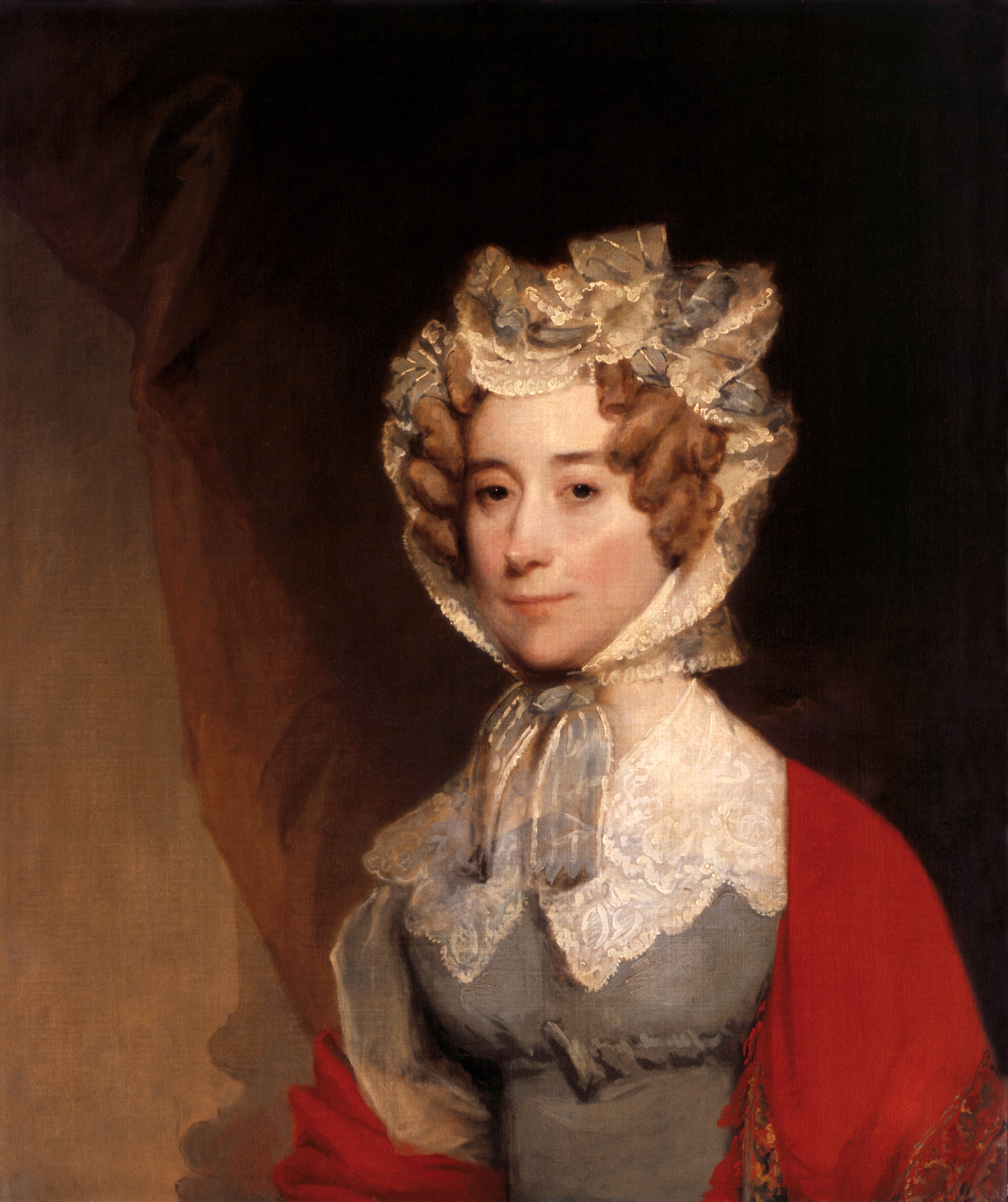
The sixth First Lady of the United States, Louisa Catherine Adams c. 1821–1826, daughter-in law of John and Abigail Adams

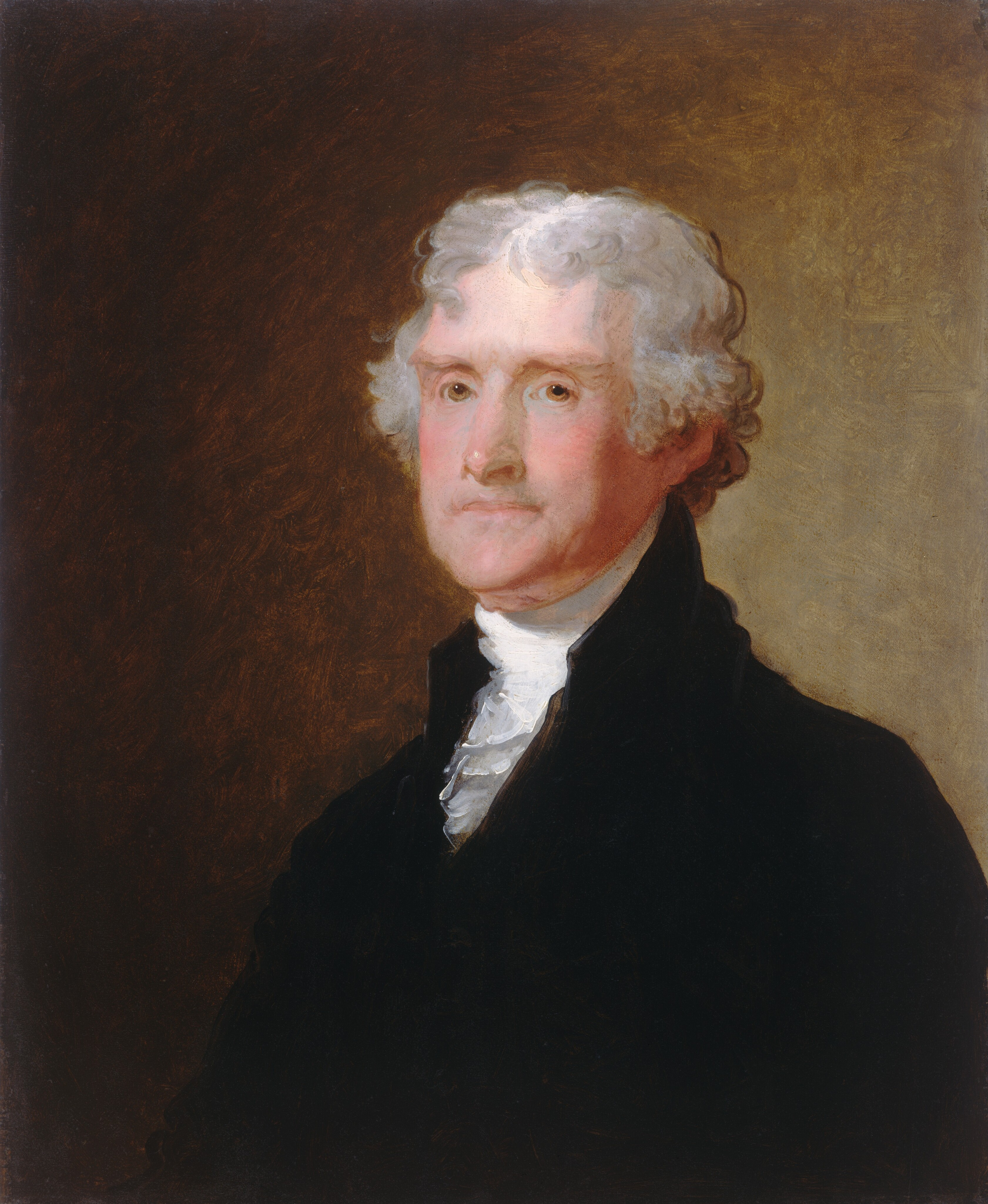
The third President of the United States, Thomas Jefferson, c. 1821, National Gallery of Art, Washington, D.C.

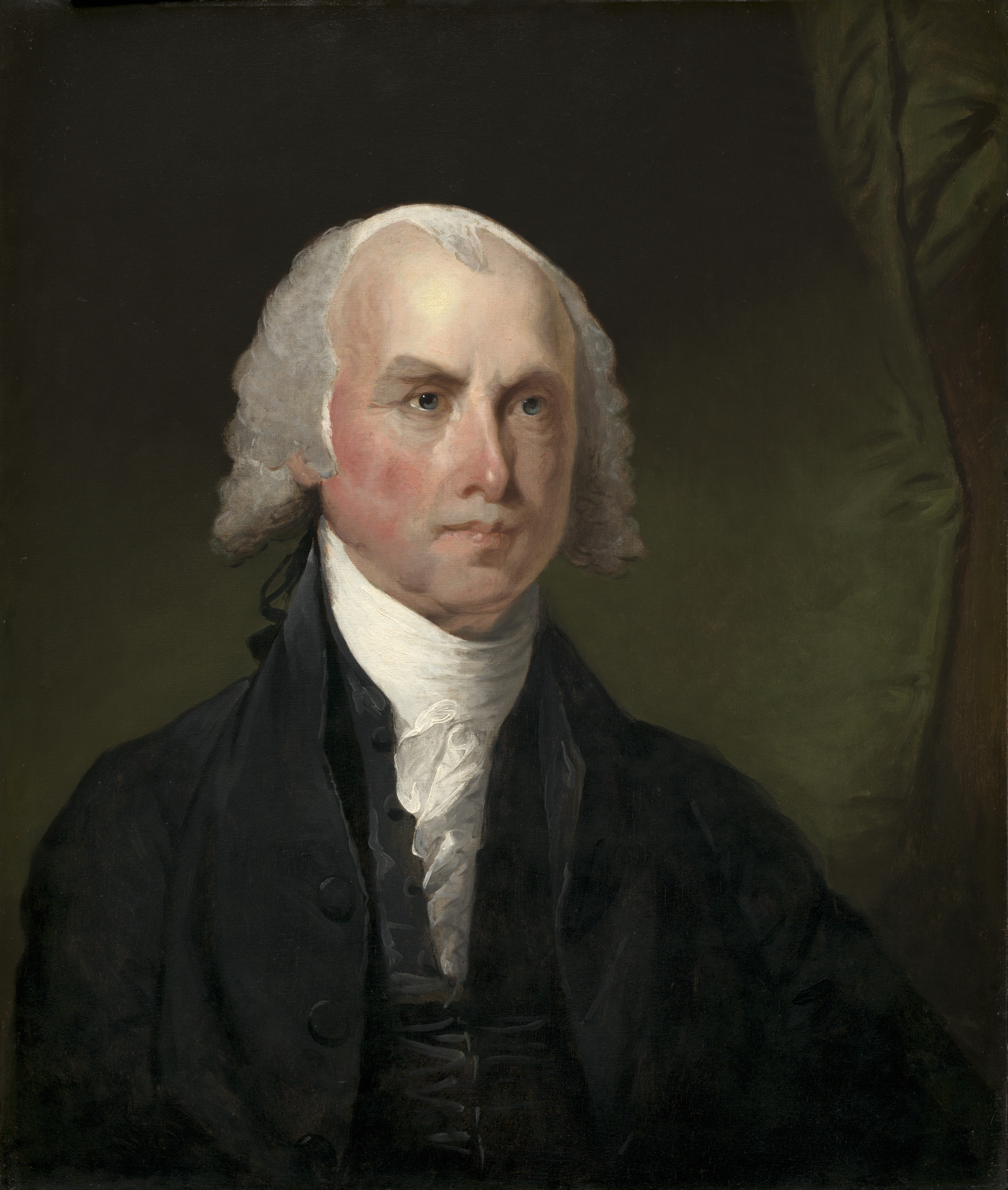
The fourth President of the United States, James Madison, c. 1821, National Gallery of Art

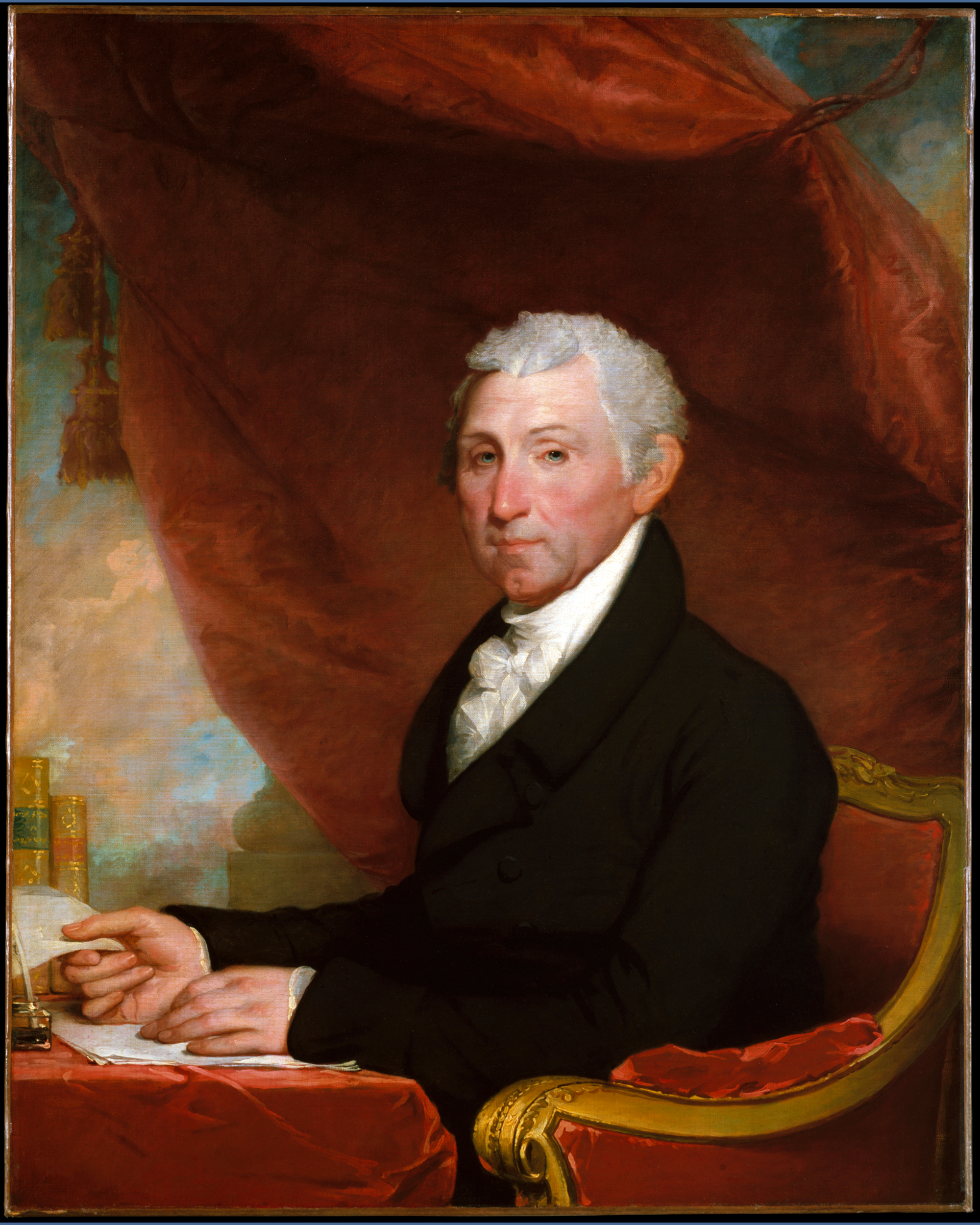
The fifth President of the United States, James Monroe, c. 1820–1822, Metropolitan Museum of Art New York City

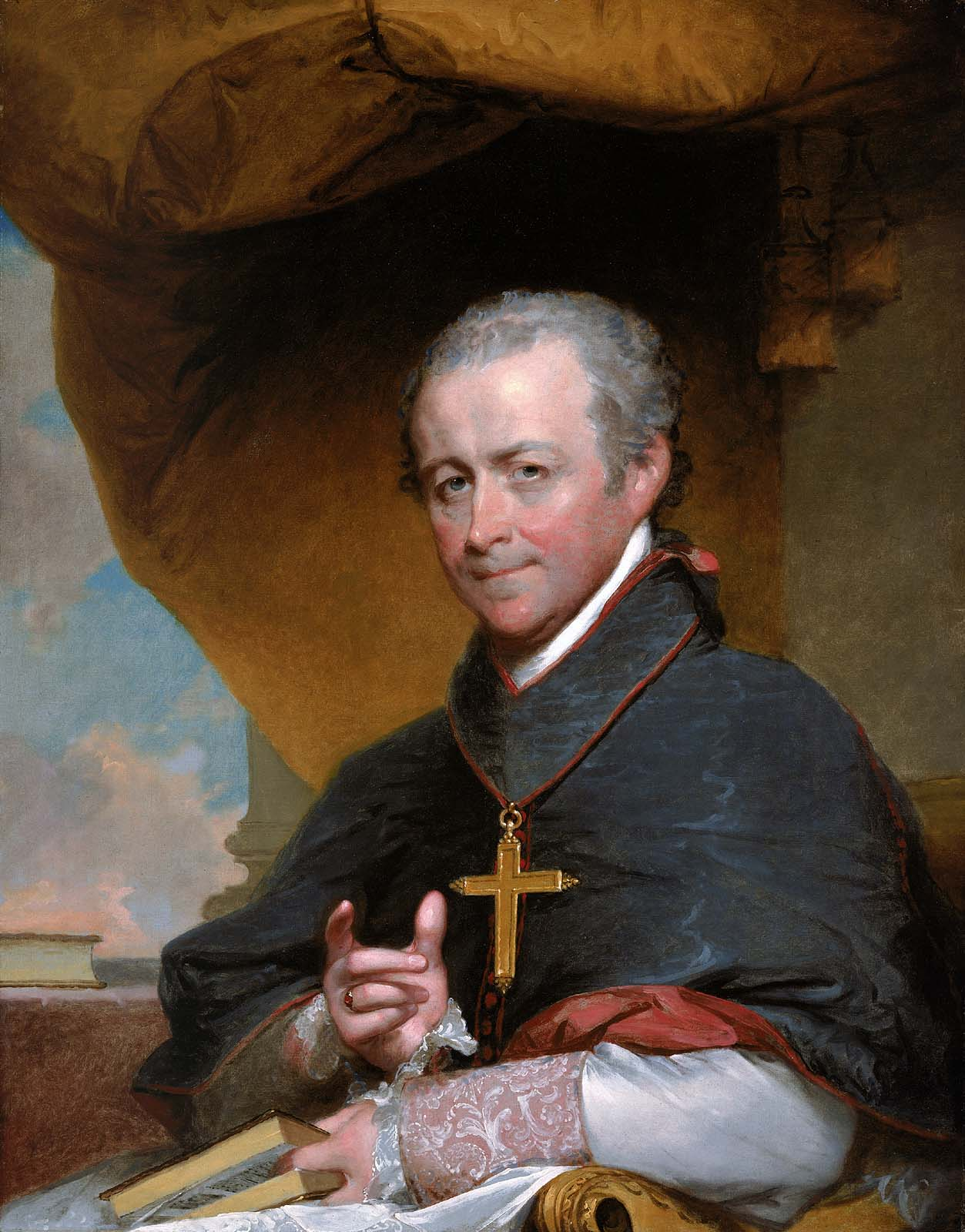
Portrait of Jean-Louis Lefebvre de Cheverus, c. 1823

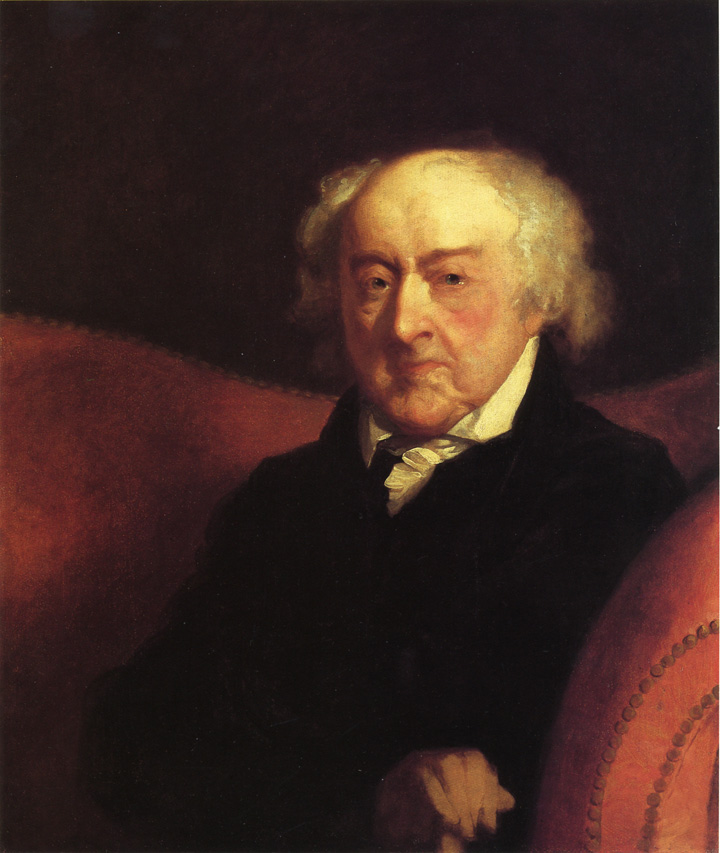
The second President of the United States, John Adams, c. 1826
