= Lime Rock, Rhode Island =

- Limerock Village Historic District
- U.S. National Register of Historic Places
- U.S. Historic district
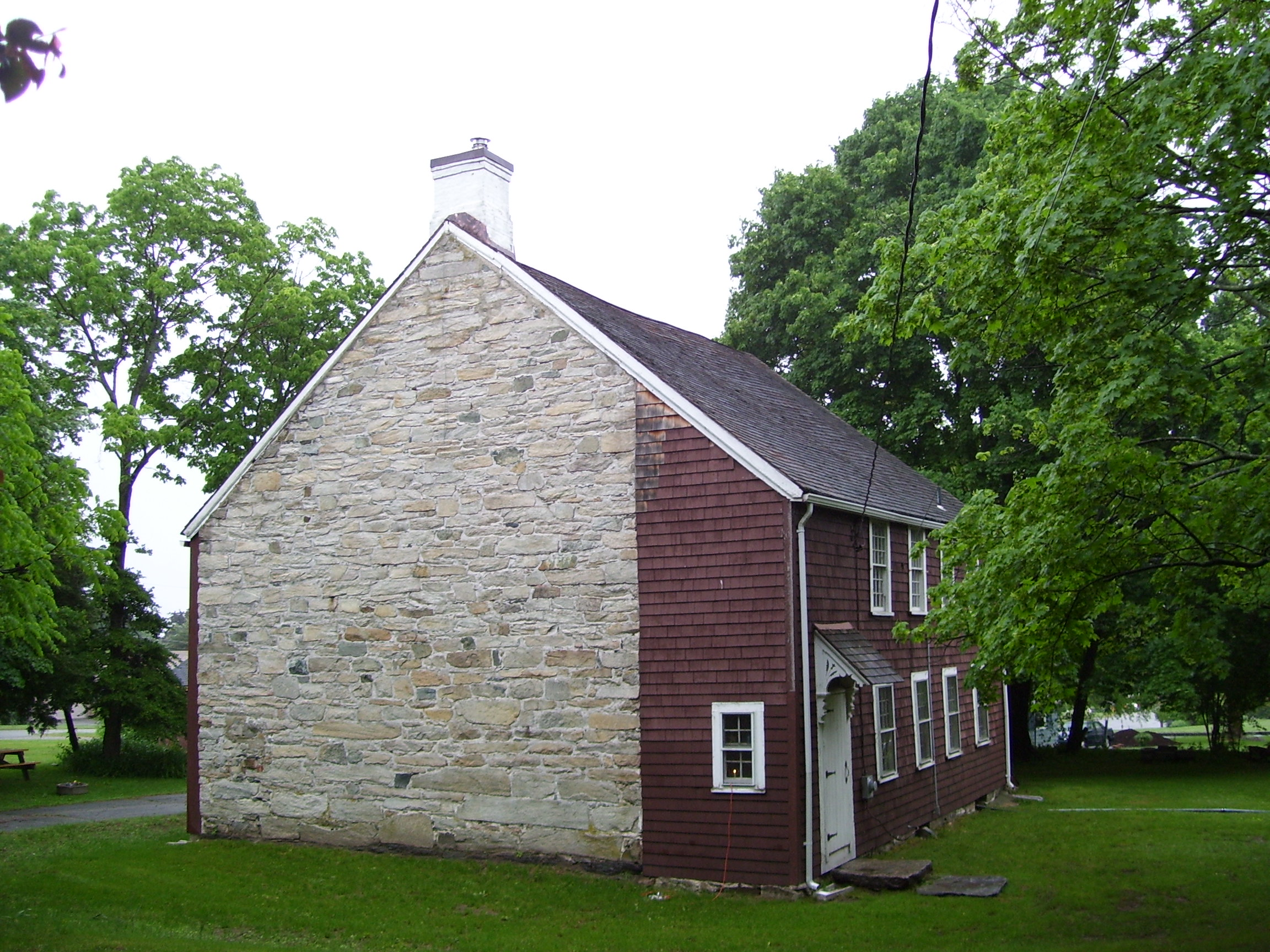
- Valentine Whitman House, a stone ender near Lime Rock

- Location within Rhode Island Location within the United States
- Location: Lincoln, Rhode Island
- Coordinates: 41°55′40″N 71°27′22″W
- Area: 248 acres (100 ha)
- Architectural style: American Colonial, Federal, Victorian
- NRHP reference No.: 74000052
- Added to NRHP: May 23, 1974

Lime Rock (Limerock) is a village and historic district in Lincoln, Rhode Island, United States, near Rhode Island Route 146. The village was named after the limestone quarries in the area, which started in the 17th century, and continue to the present where Conklin Limestone Company now operates. Because of the abundance of limestone in the area, many houses had massive end chimneys and were called "stone enders," a distinctly Rhode Island style of architecture. The historic district includes 21 historically significant properties in an area extending from Wilbur Road (formerly Jeremiah Smith Hill Road), just west of its junction with Old Louisquisset Pike, eastward to Great Road, and then along Great Road as far as Simon Sayles Road. Among these properties are three quarries, and the ruins of three old lime kilns. It was listed on the National Register of Historic Places in 1974.

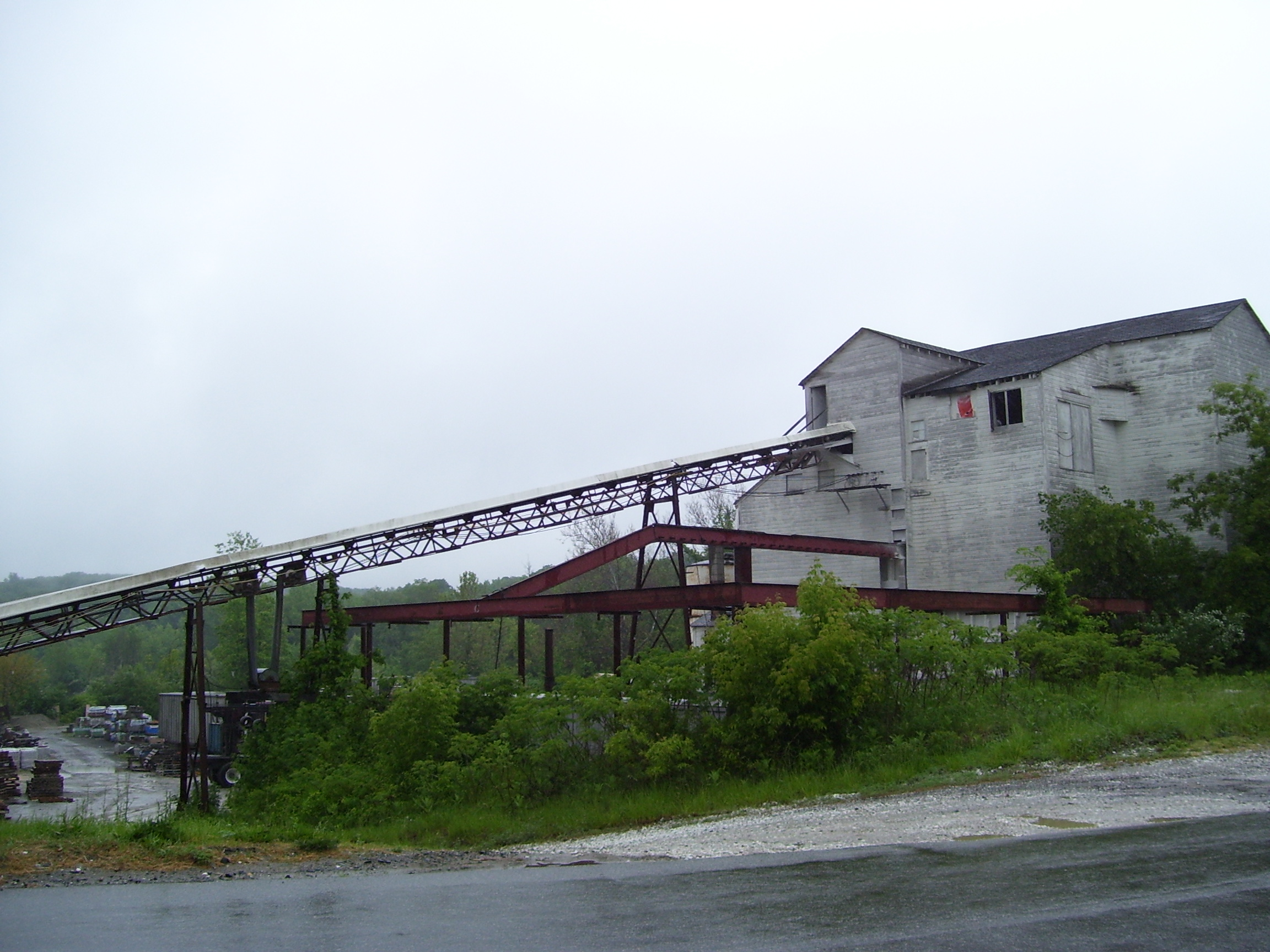
Limestone Factory

== See also ==
- National Register of Historic Places listings in Providence County, Rhode Island
