= Clemence–Irons House =

Historic house in Rhode Island, United States

- U.S. National Register of Historic Places
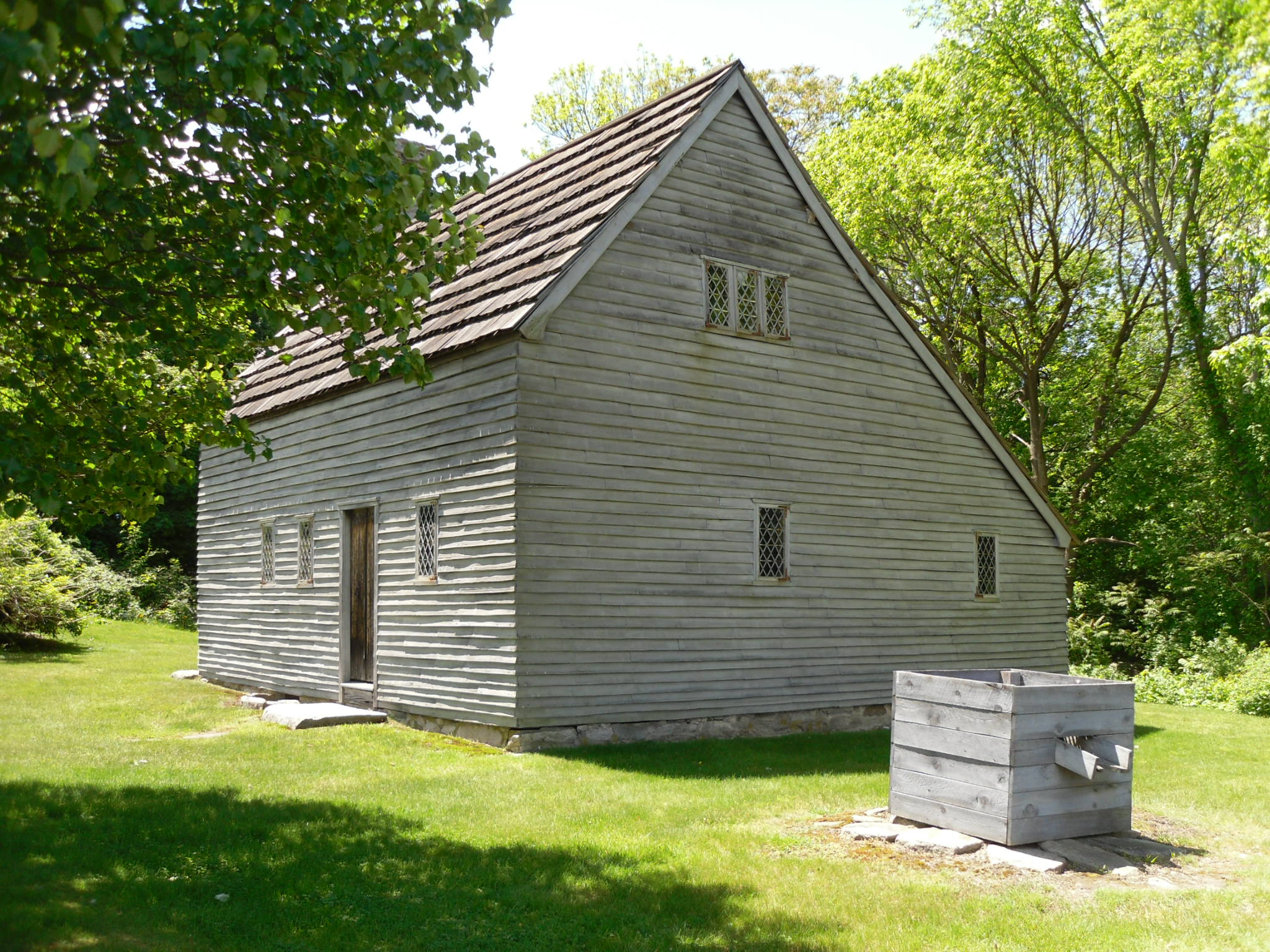
- The non-stone ender side of the house.

- Location within Rhode Island Location within the United States
- Location: 38 George Waterman Road, Johnston, Rhode Island
- Coordinates: 41°50′21″N 71°29′4″W
- Built: 1691
- Architectural style: Stone Ender
- NRHP reference No.: 73000068
- Added to NRHP: July 2, 1973

The Clemence–Irons House (also known as the Edward Manton House) is a historic house located in Johnston, Rhode Island. It was built by Richard Clemence in 1691 and is a rare surviving example of a "stone ender", a building type first developed in the western part of England and common in colonial Rhode Island. The house is listed on the National Register of Historic Places, and is a historic house museum owned and operated by Historic New England. It is open Saturdays between June and mid-October.

== History ==
The Irons house pictured in 1902 prior to restoration

Richard Clemence, a farmer, constructed the Clemence–Irons House in 1691. Passing through a series of owners in the 18th, 19th, and 20th centuries, the house had grown to 13 rooms by 1938, when it was purchased by Henry Sharpe and his sisters, Ellen Sharpe and Louisa Sharpe Metcalf. Additions by this time included a one-story parlor with a separate fireplace at the north end, a second lean-to with kitchen, bath and stair hall and two bedrooms, a one-story ell at the southwest corner, and a front hall and porch at the southeast corner.

Nonetheless, the Sharpe family valued the age and recognized the stone-ender characteristics of the house. It commissioned Norman Isham, who had directed restoration efforts at nearby Eleazer Arnold House in 1920, to investigate the structure and restore the house to its 17th-century appearance.

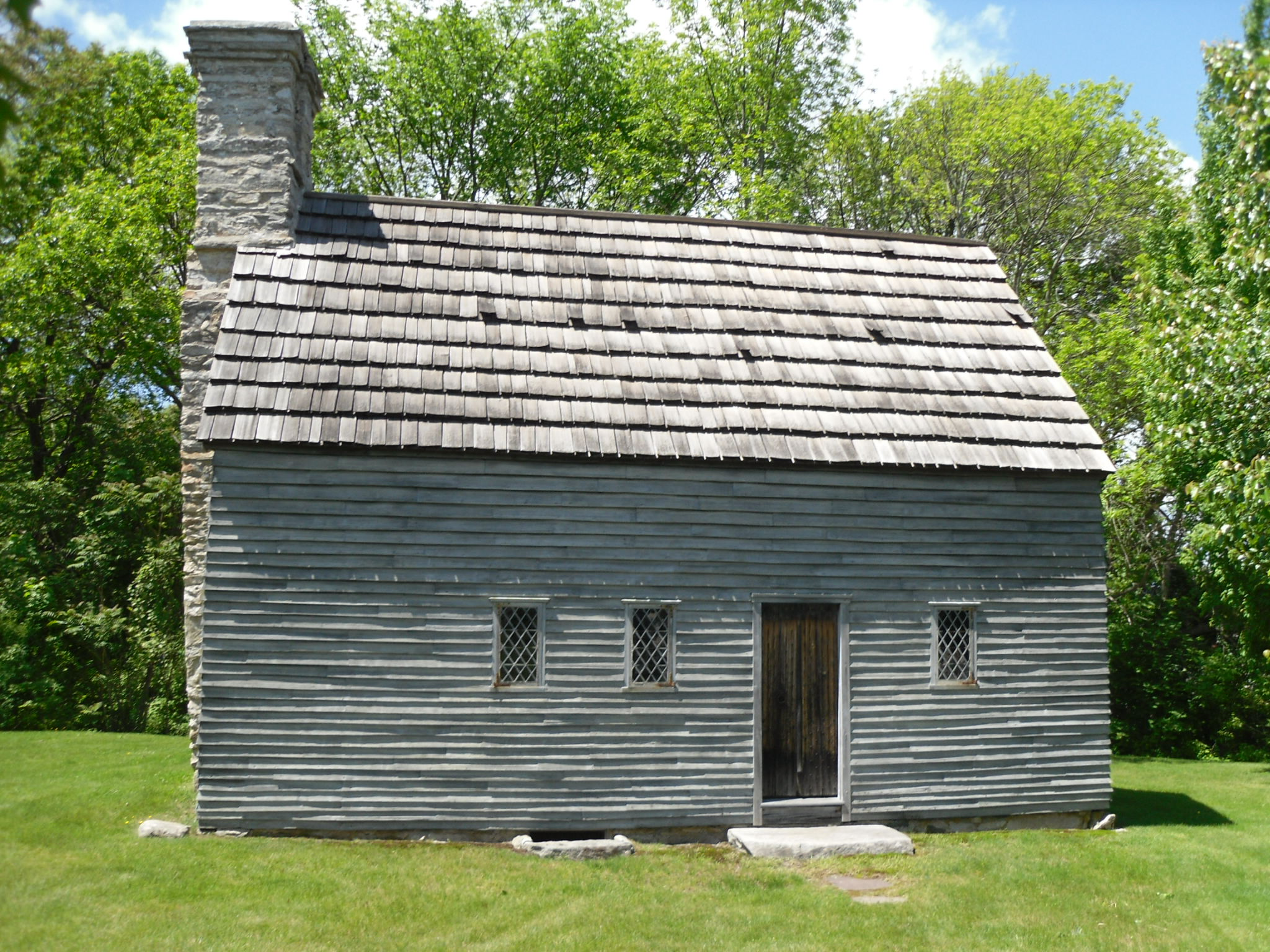
The house as it appears today

Isham determined that the original house consisted of one-and-a-half stories with a rear lean-to and a steep gable roof. In the plan, he found evidence of four rooms on the first floor instead of the more typical one-room plan of other early stone-enders. Removing the later additions and baring the main block of non-original interior finishes, the house was rebuilt to reflect Isham's findings.

The plan consists of a great room and chamber in the main block, with a kitchen and second smaller chamber in the rear lean-to. Using a combination of salvaged and new materials to recreate the original appearance of the house, Isham also commissioned furnishings made from old wood to complement the architectural reconstruction.

Significant as one of the oldest houses in Rhode Island, the Clemence–Irons House also is important as a record of mid-20th-century restoration ideas and methods. The house was donated to the Society for the Preservation of New England Antiquities, now known as Historic New England, in 1947. In 2003 a dendrochronology survey of the tree rings determined a 1691 construction date. Together with the Eleazer Arnold House, the Clemence–Irons House provides a rare opportunity to study the stone-ender in New England.

== See also ==
- List of the oldest buildings in Rhode Island
- Eleazer Arnold House, another nearby Rhode Island stone-ender owned by Historic New England
- National Register of Historic Places in Providence County, Rhode Island
