= John Bliss House =

Coordinates: 41.49974°N 71.30204°W

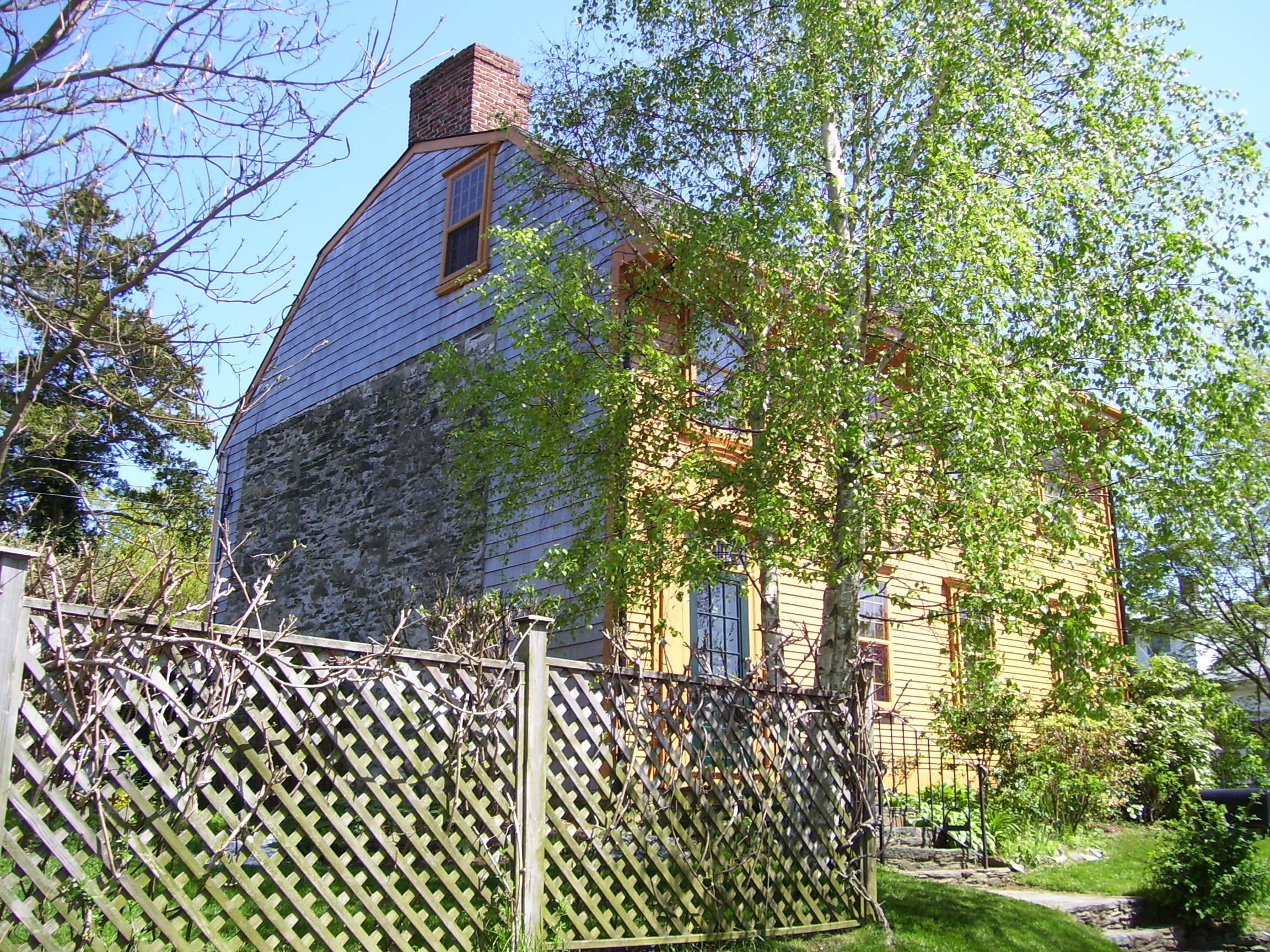
John Bliss House

The John Bliss House is an historic stone ender house on 2 Wilbur Avenue near Bliss Road in Newport, Rhode Island. The late seventeenth century Jacobean house is one of the oldest surviving buildings in Rhode Island. It was listed on the National Register of Historic Places in 2025.

The large farmhouse was built around 1679/1680 by Quaker Elder, John Bliss, on land deeded to him by his father-in-law Governor Benedict Arnold, Rhode Island's first Governor and great grandfather to the Revolutionary War traitor of the same name. John Bliss deeded the property and house to his son in 1715. The house features a large stone chimney at one end. It remains privately owned as of 2015.
