= Stone ender =

Style of Rhode Island architecture

1653 Roger Mowry House (Providence) diagram from Norman Isham's 1895 book

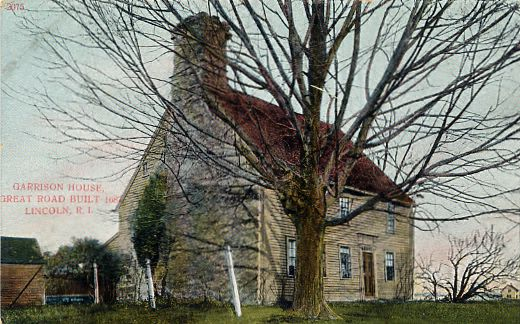
Eleazer Arnold House, 1691, Lincoln, Rhode Island

The stone-ender is a unique style of Rhode Island architecture that developed in the 17th century where one wall in a house is made up of a large stone chimney.

== History ==
Rhode Island was first settled in 1636 by Roger Williams and other colonists from England. Many of the colonists came from western England and brought the prevalent British architectural ideas with them to New England, but adapted these to the environment of Rhode Island. The colonists built “stone enders” which made use of the material that was in abundance in the area: timber and stone. Rhode Island also had an abundance of limestone (in contrast to the other New England states), and this allowed Rhode Islanders to make mortar to build massive end chimneys on their houses. Much of the lime was quarried at Limerock in Lincoln, Rhode Island.

Only a few stone enders remain in the 21st century. Architectural restoration specialist Norman Isham restored several original stone enders in the early 20th century (see Clement Weaver House and Clemence-Irons House). Scituate sculptor Armand LaMontagne hand-built a large 17th-century style stone-ender off of Route 6 in Scituate, Rhode Island in the 1970s.

== Description ==
Stone ender houses were usually timber-framed, one and one-half or two stories in height, with one room on each floor. One end of the house contained a massive stone chimney which usually filled the entire end wall, thus giving the dwelling the name of “stone ender.” Robert O. Jones noted that the windows were very small “casements filled with oiled paper” and that “the stairs to the upper chambers were steep, ladder-like structures usually squeezed in between the chimney and the front entrance.” He points out that a few houses may have had leaded glass windows, but that was very rare. See Clement Weaver House, East Greenwich, Rhode Island for an example containing the leaded glass windows and ladder-like stairs.

== List of early extant Rhode Island stone-enders ==
- Edward Searle House, Cranston, Rhode Island, 1670–1720
- Clement Weaver House, East Greenwich, Rhode Island, 1679
- Thomas Fenner House, Cranston, Rhode Island, 1677
- Clemence-Irons House, Johnston, Rhode Island, 1691
- Eleazer Arnold House, Lincoln, Rhode Island, 1693
- John Bliss House, Newport, Rhode Island c. 1680
- Valentine Whitman House, Lincoln, Rhode Island, 1694
- Smith-Appleby House, Smithfield, Rhode Island, 1696 (chimney later modified)
- Joseph Smith House, North Providence, 1705
- Greene-Bowen House, Warwick, Rhode Island c. 1715
- John Tripp House, Providence/Newport, Rhode Island, 1720

== Gallery ==
Epenetus Olney House in North Providence, demolished by 1900

Arthur Fenner House (c. 1655) in Cranston, demolished 1886

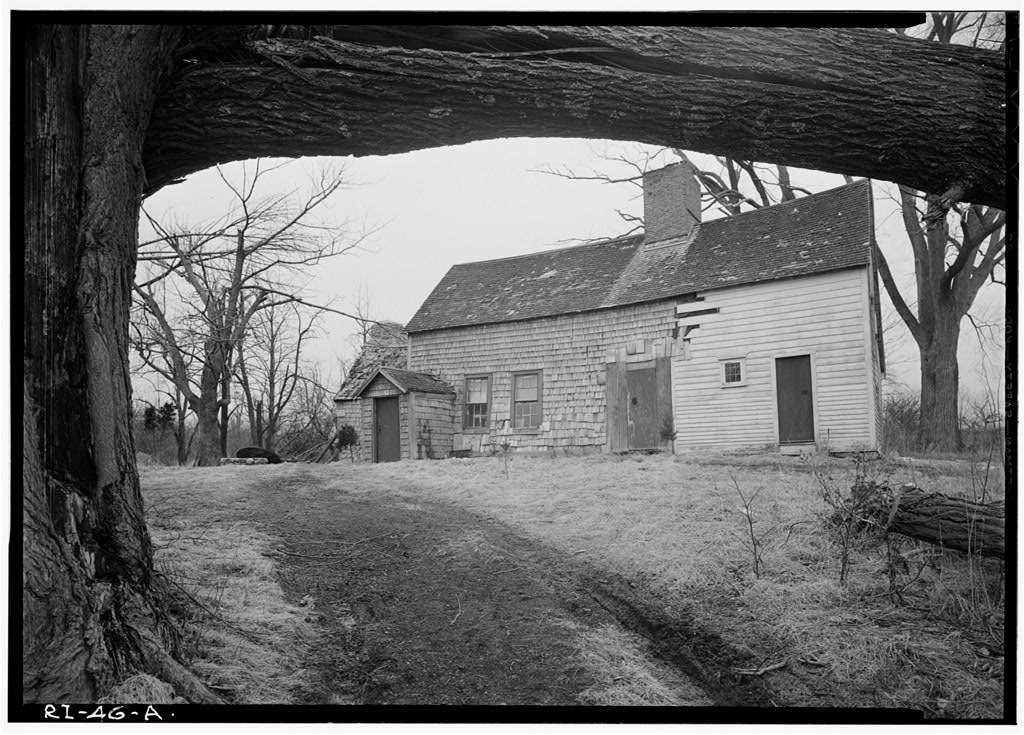
Clement Weaver House, c. 1679, in East Greenwich, Rhode Island

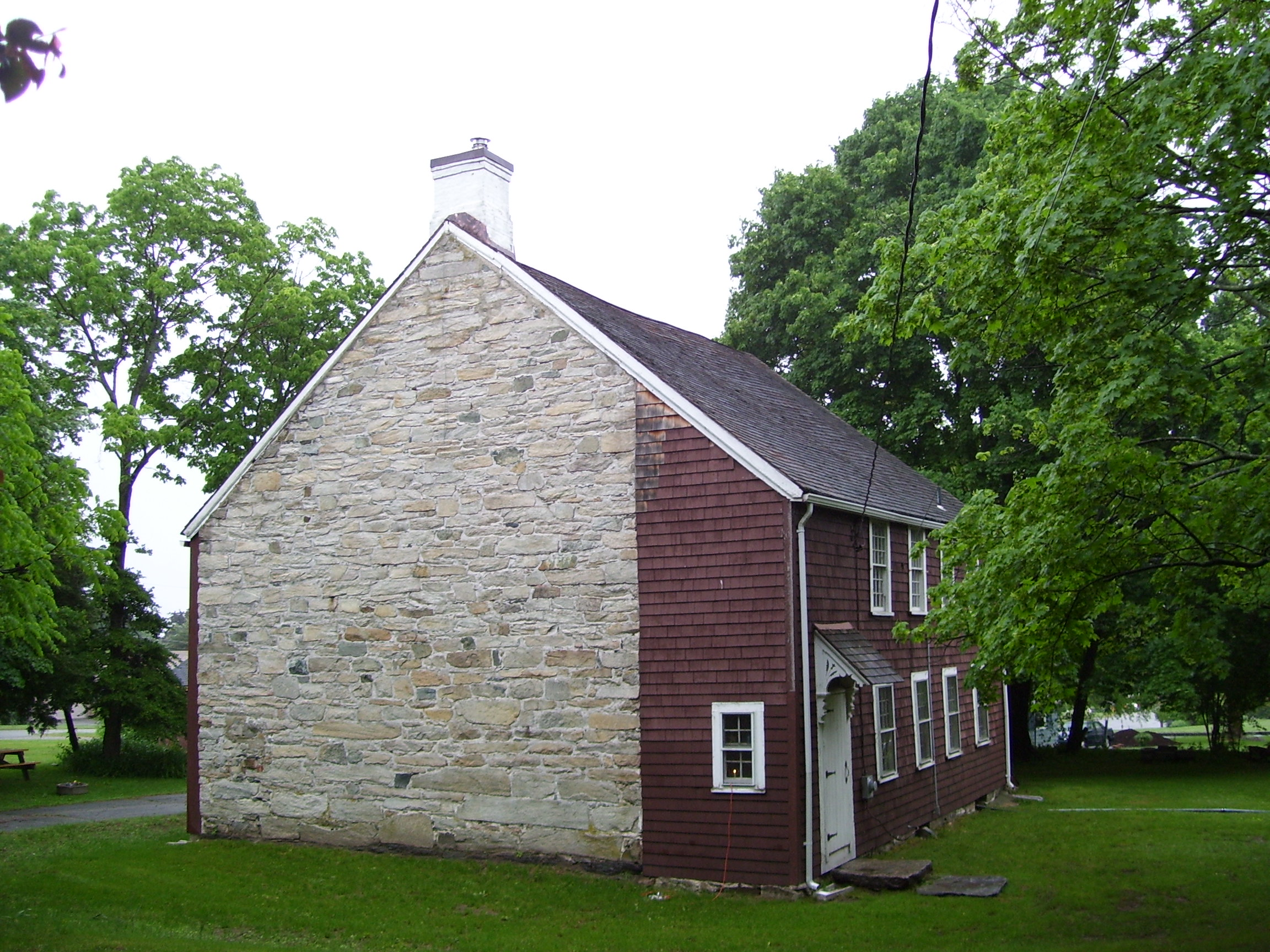
Valentine Whitman House, 1694, Lincoln, Rhode Island

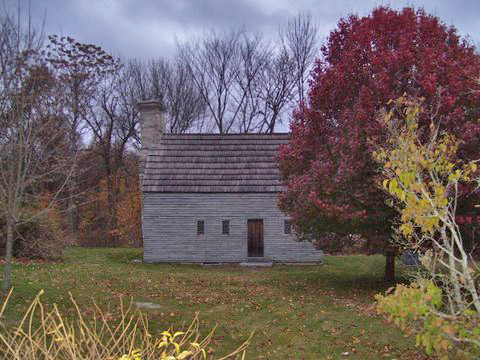
Irons House, 1691, Johnston, Rhode Island

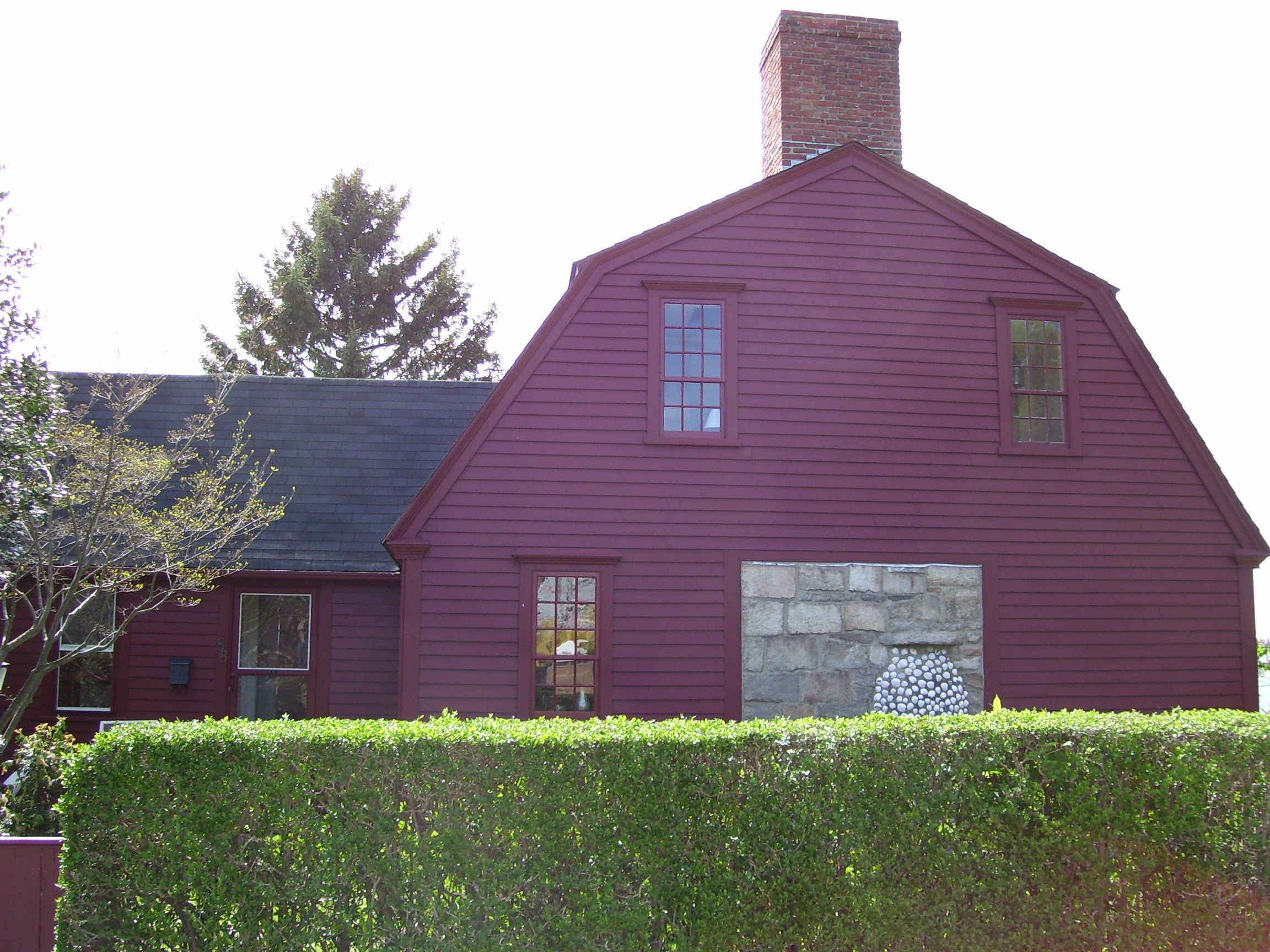
Tripp House, 1720, Washington Street, Newport, Rhode Island

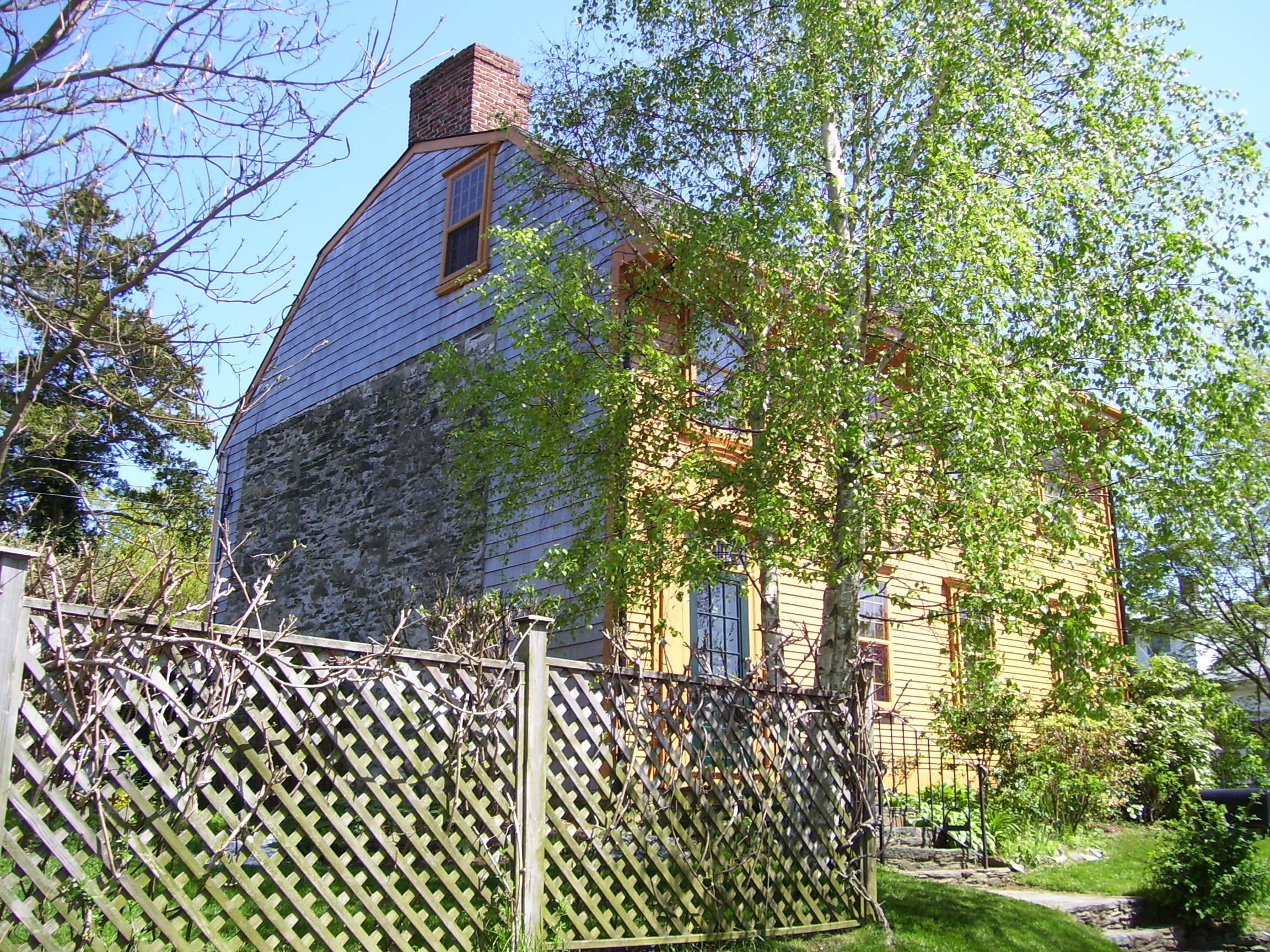
John Bliss House, c. 1680, 2 Wilbur Avenue, Newport, Rhode Island

Mowry Tavern, c. 1650, in Providence near North Burial Ground (demolished c. 1900)

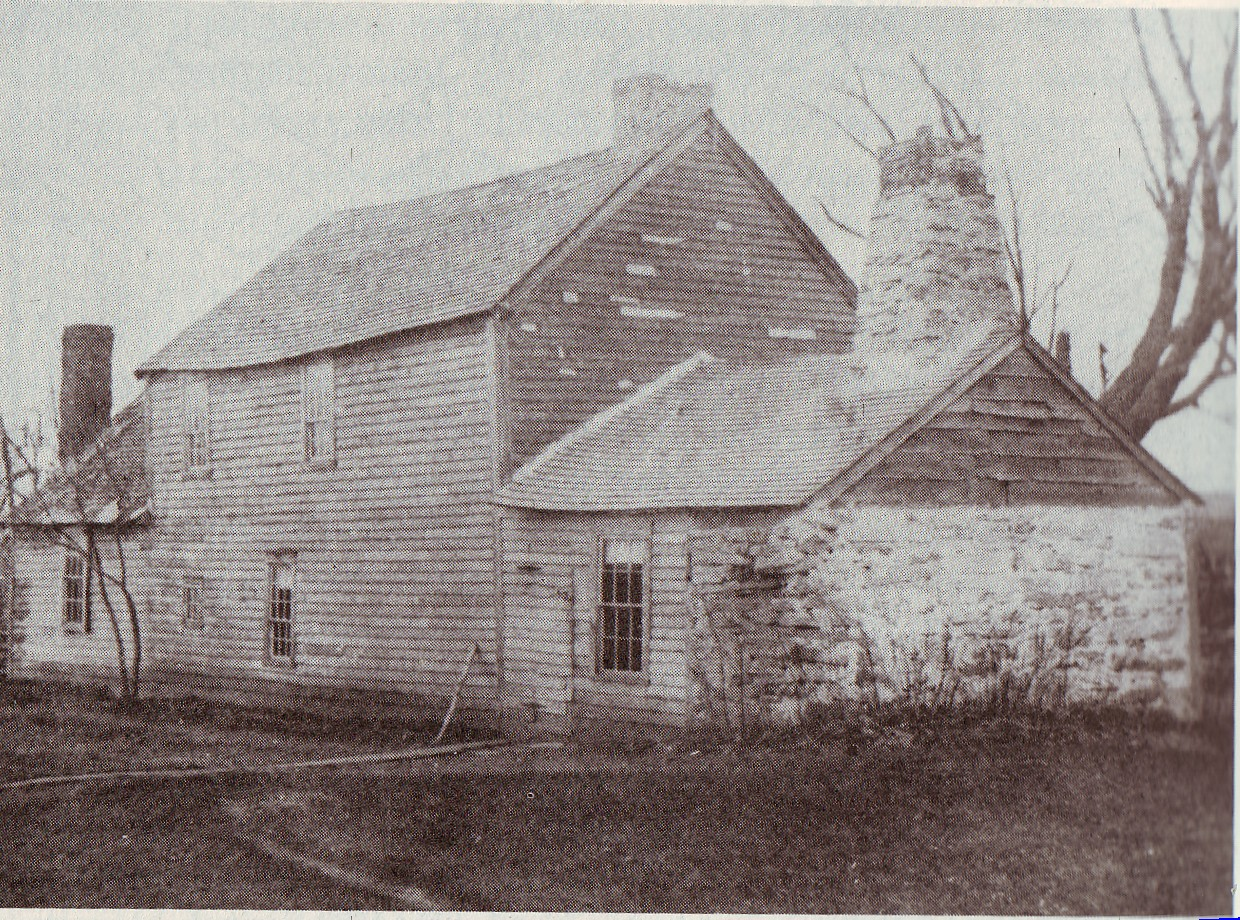
John Mowry, Jr. or Sayles House on Wesquadomeset (Sayles) Hill near Iron Mine Hill and Sayles Hill Roads in North Smithfield, demolished in the early 20th century

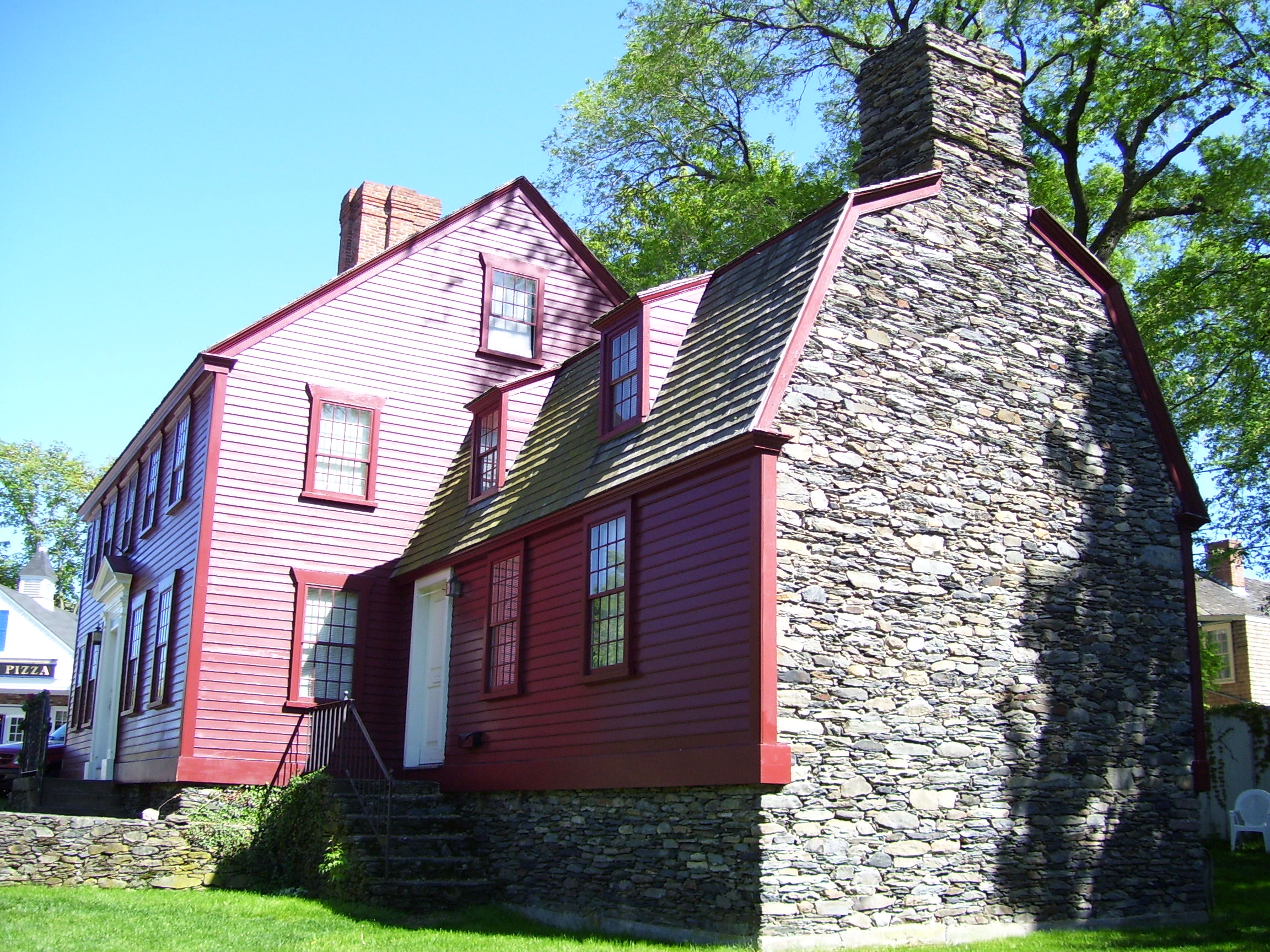
Stone ender on Memorial Boulevard in Newport, Rhode Island

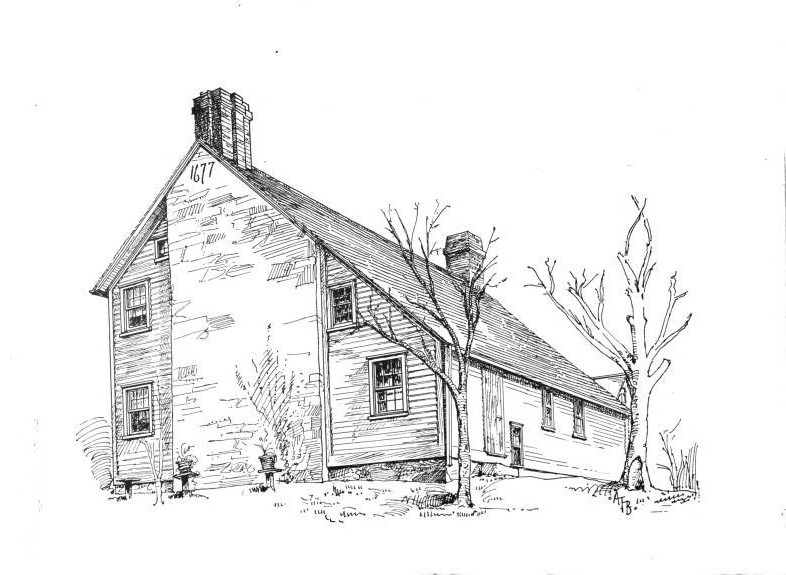
Thomas Fenner House in Cranston, Rhode Island

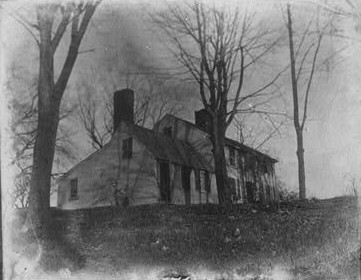
Edward Searle House in Cranston, Rhode Island

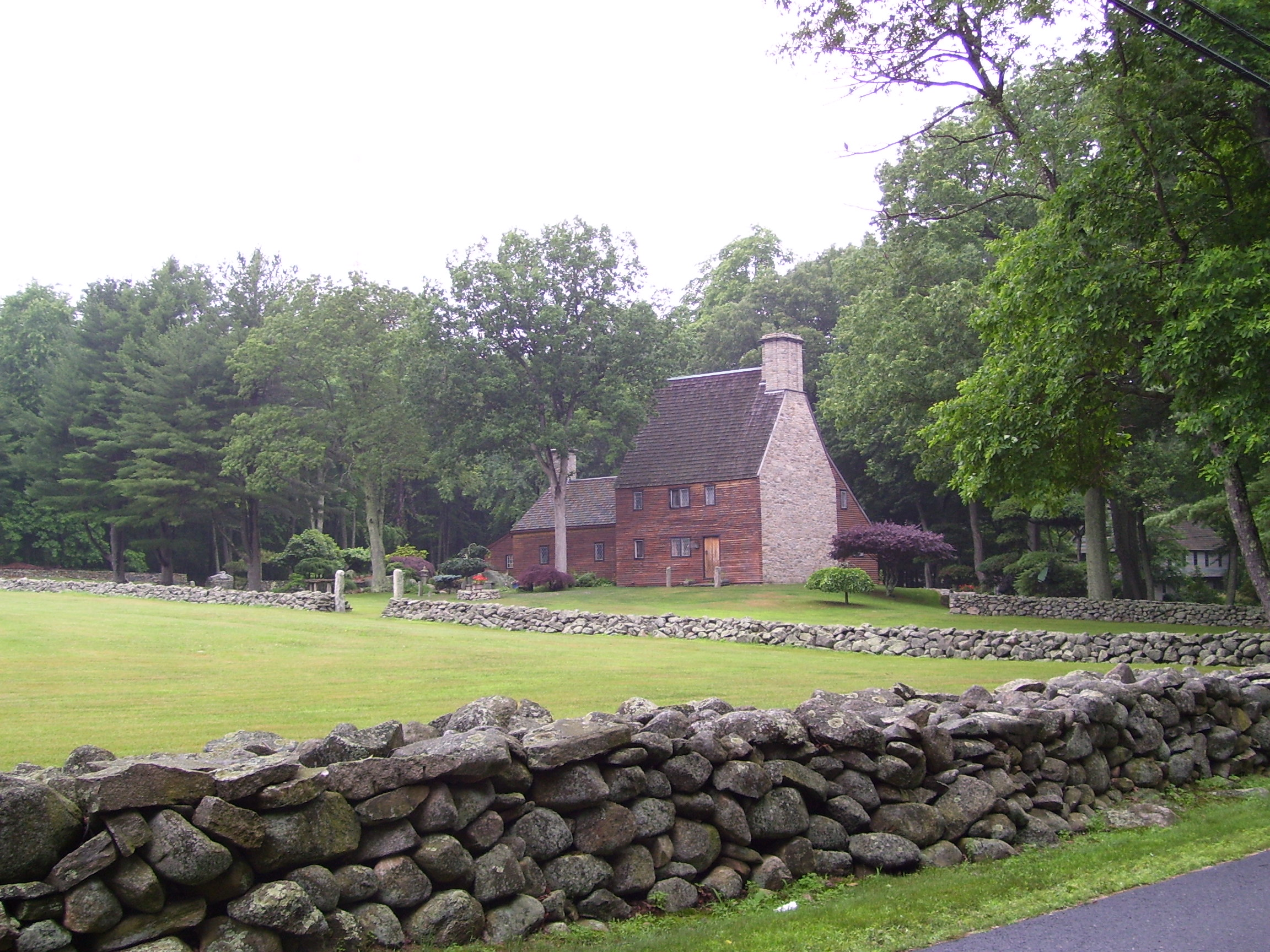
Armand Lamontagne's stone ender from the late 20th century in Scituate, Rhode Island

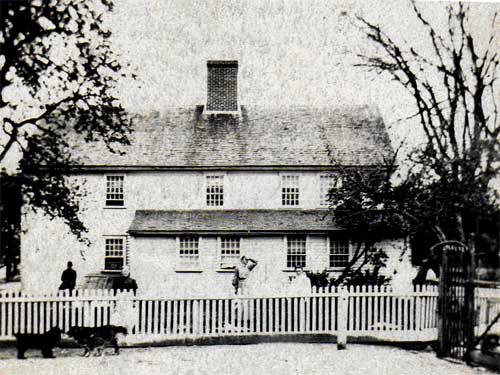
Smith-Appleby House in Smithfield with a modified chimney

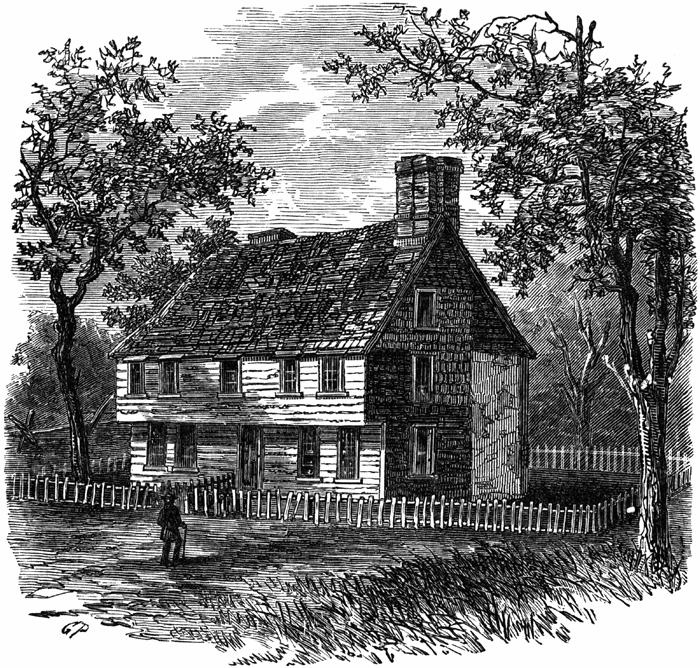
Governor William Coddington House, a stone ender in Newport built in 1640–1641, was demolished in 1835.

Thomas Field house, c. 1690, on Fields Point, a vernacular building that is now demolished

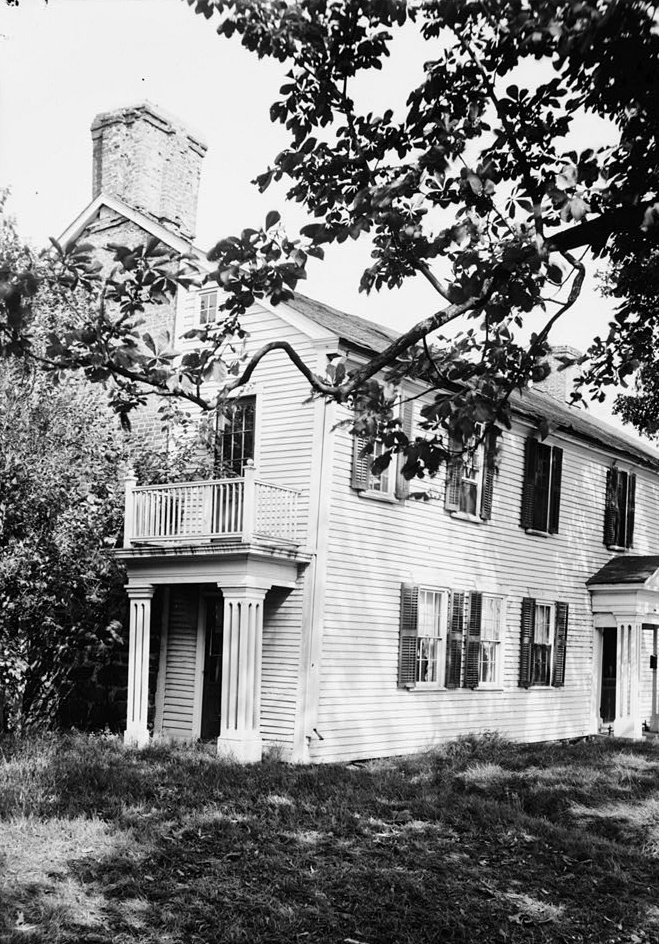
Joseph Smith House, ca. 1705, with stone end now almost completely enclosed.

== See also ==
- List of the oldest buildings in Rhode Island
