= Smith–Appleby House =

Historic house in Rhode Island, United States

- U.S. National Register of Historic Places
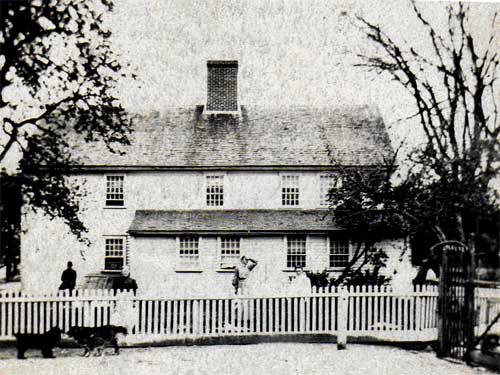

- Location within Rhode Island Location within the United States
- Nearest city: 220 Stillwater Road, Smithfield, Rhode Island
- Coordinates: 41°54′7″N 71°31′6″W
- Built: 1697
- Architectural style: Colonial
- NRHP reference No.: 74000005
- Added to NRHP: May 1, 1974

The Smith–Appleby House Museum is a historic house museum in Smithfield, Rhode Island. It is now home to the Smithfield Historical Society.

== Description ==
Elisha Smith, a grandson of one of Rhode Island's co-founders, John Smith, "The Miller," built the original part of this house, a small stone-ender, in 1696. The house was enlarged to a saltbox configuration c. 1713, adding chambers to the side and rear of the central chimney. Around 1750 the roof was raised on the rear section, giving the house the full 2 1/2-story height it has today. Between then and 1830 the house underwent a number of further alterations and enlargements, including the c. 1800 attachment of a second house (hauled from Johnston) that nearly doubled its living space. The relocation of Stillwater Road in the 19th century as a consequence of the creation of Georgiaville Pond also resulted in a reconfiguration of the house, functionally reversing the front and rear.

The original farm grounds contained mills and a blacksmith shop on 700 acres (280 ha).

The Smith–Appleby House Museum is open for tours during scheduled events, or tours may be arranged on request.

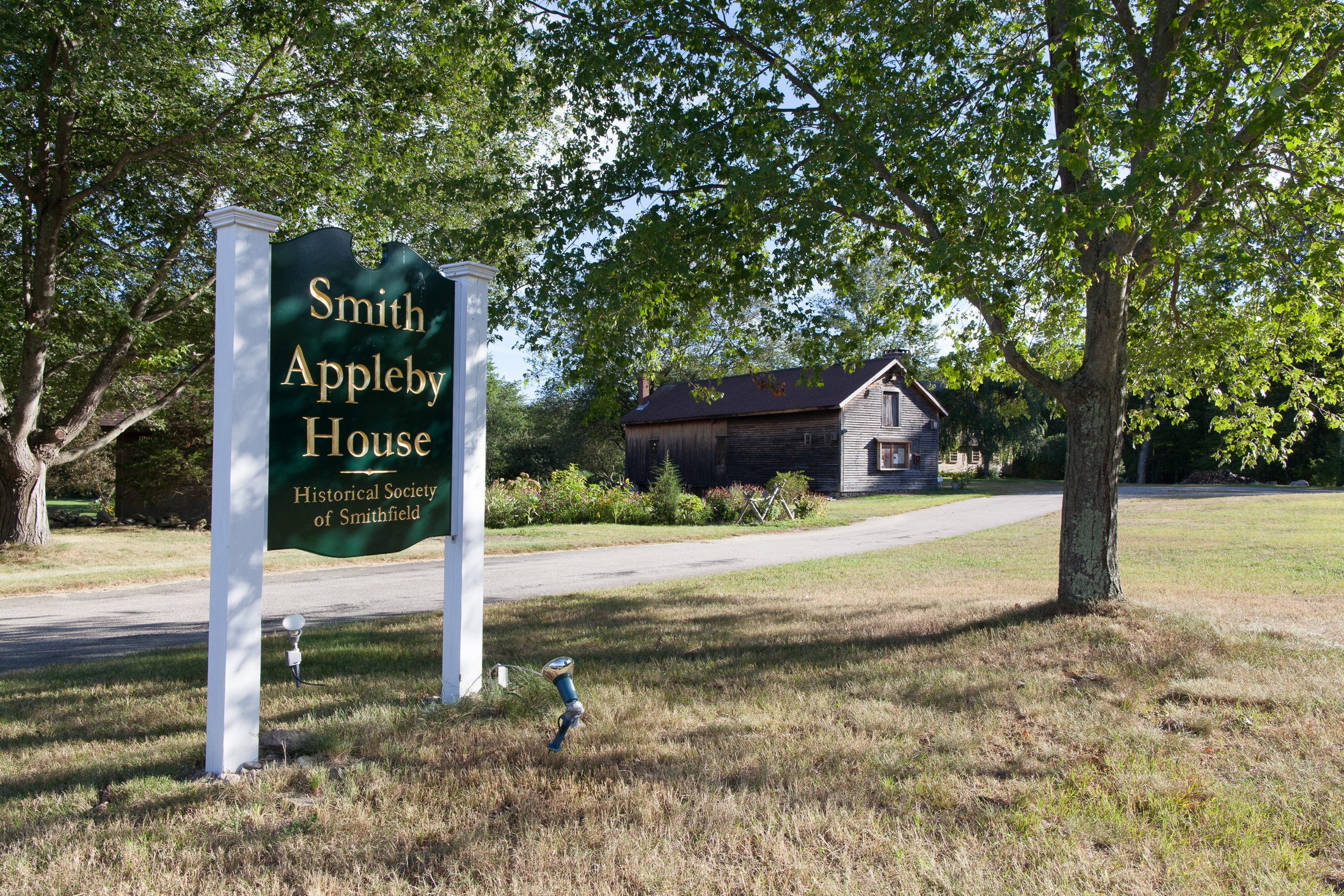

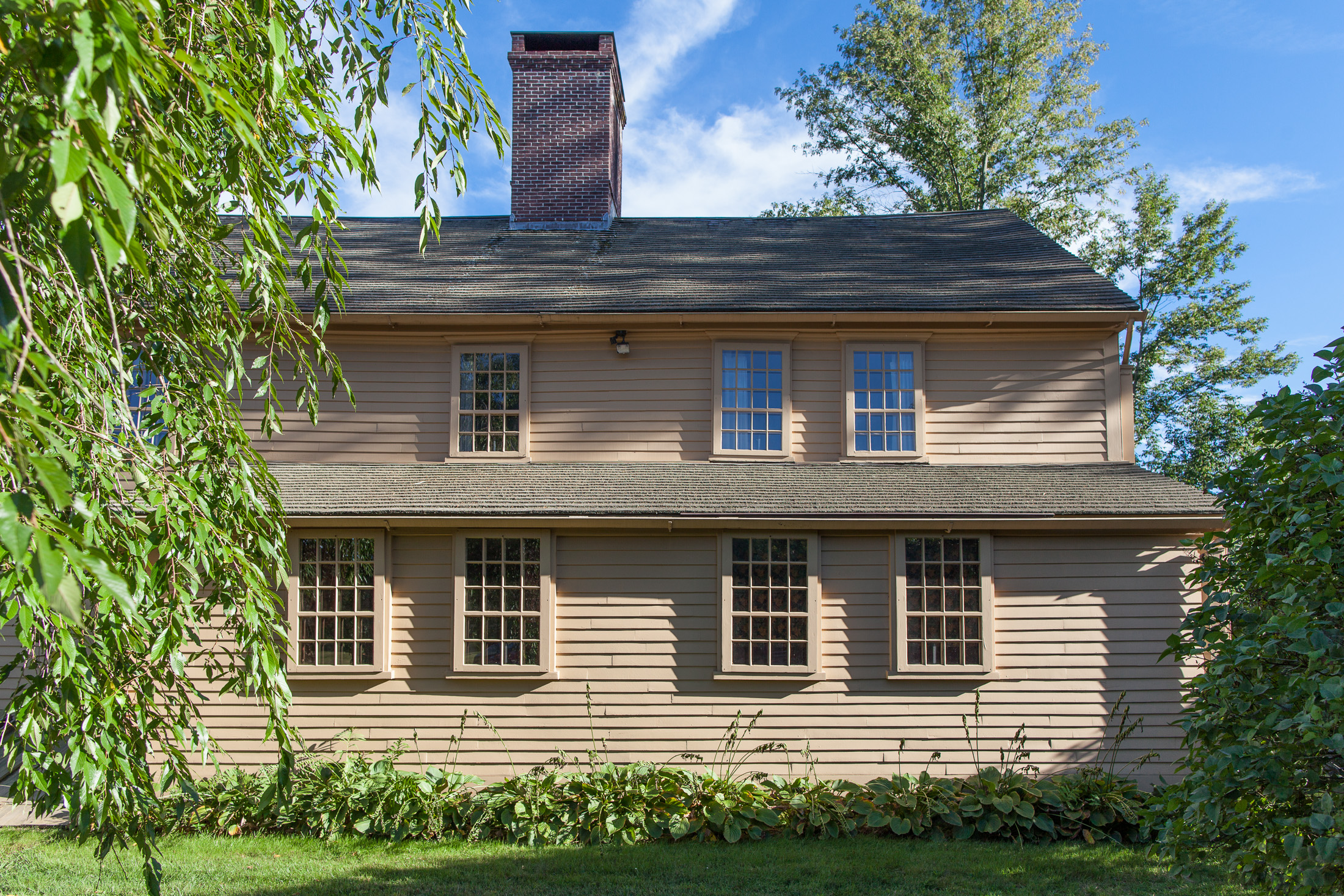

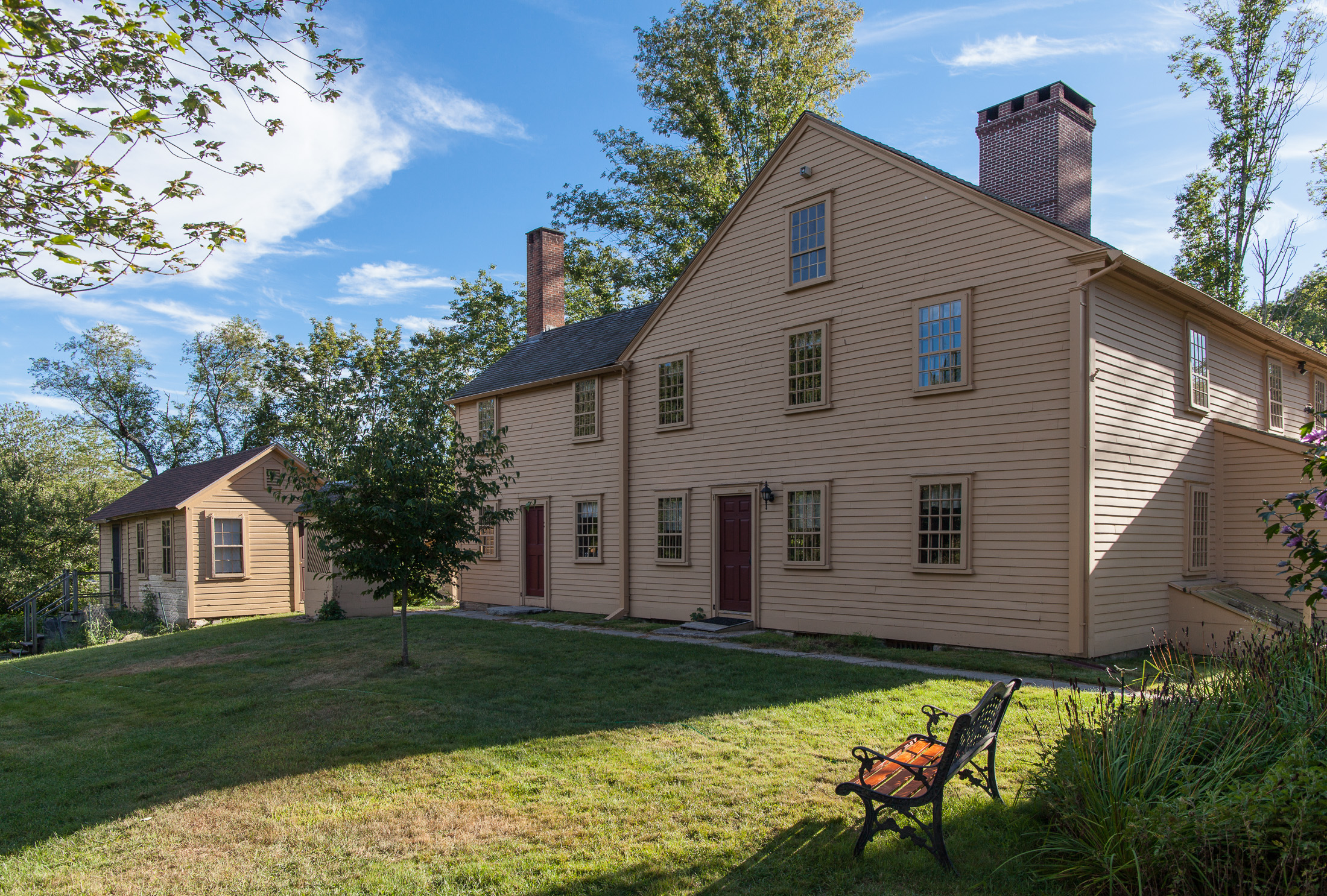

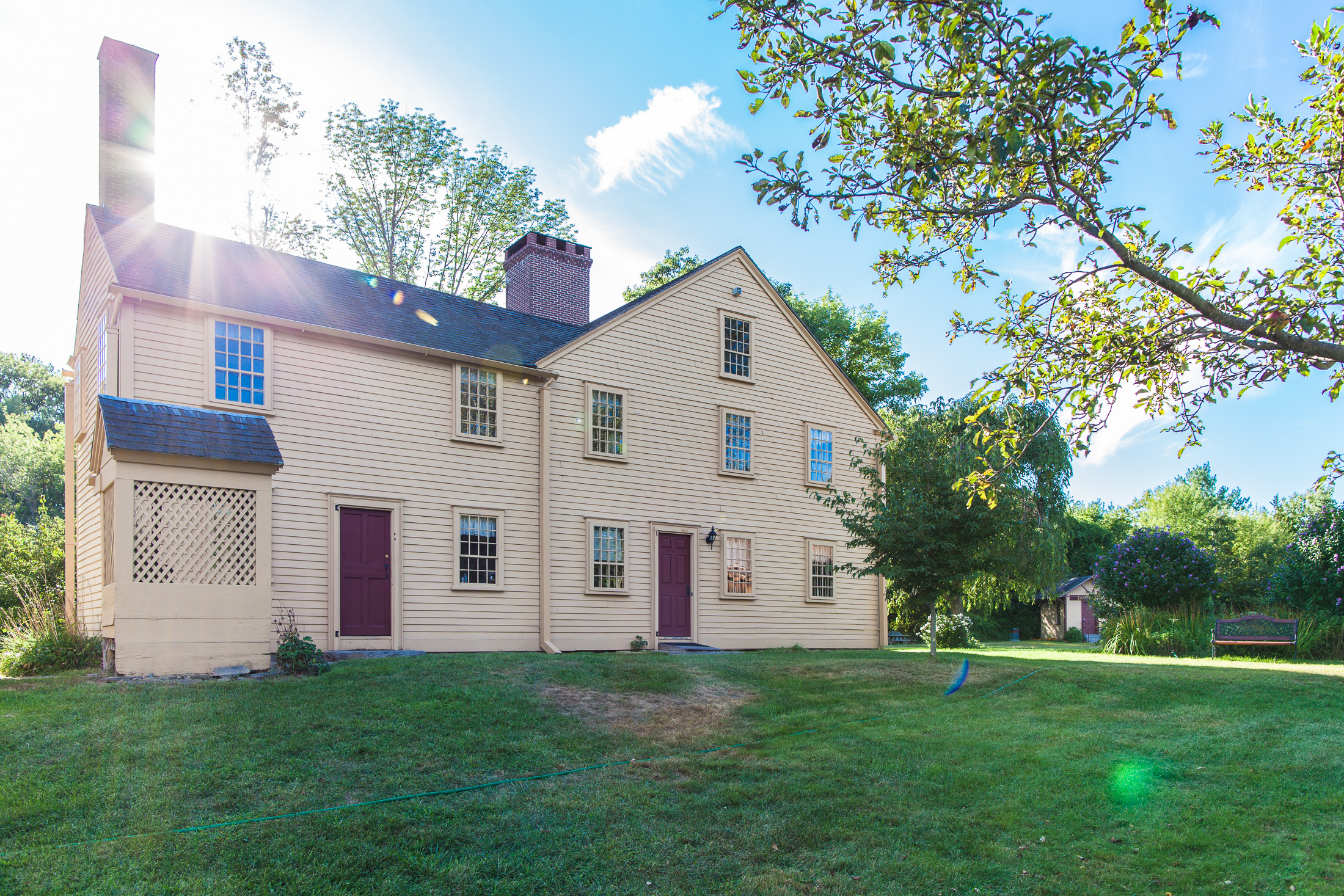

== See also ==
- List of the oldest buildings in Rhode Island
- National Register of Historic Places listings in Providence County, Rhode Island
