= Thomas Fenner House =

Historic house in Rhode Island, United States

- Major Thomas Fenner House
- U.S. National Register of Historic Places
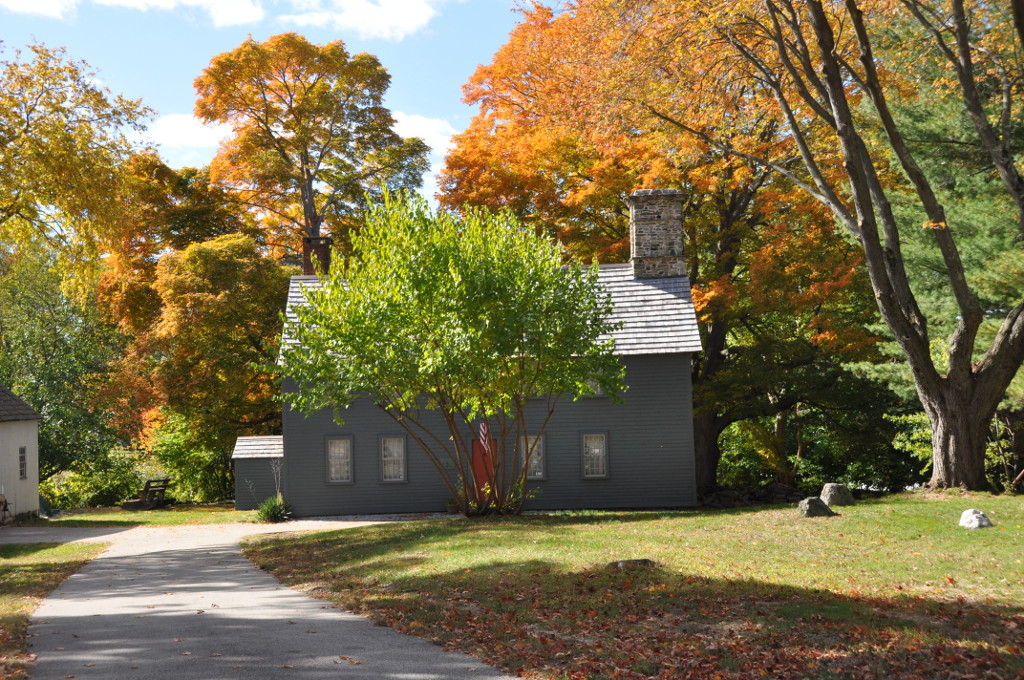

- Location within Rhode Island Location within the United States
- Location: 43 Stony Acre Drive, Cranston, Rhode Island
- Coordinates: 41°47′27″N 71°29′19″W
- Area: Cranston, Providence Rhode Island
- Built: 1677
- Architectural style: Colonial, Georgian
- NRHP reference No.: 90000143
- Added to NRHP: March 2, 1990

The Thomas Fenner House or the "Sam Joy Place" is a historic stone-ender house in Cranston, Rhode Island. It the oldest surviving house in the Providence Plantations portion of Rhode Island. The only older structure in the state is the White Horse Tavern in Newport. The house was built as a farmhouse in 1677 after King Philip's War by Captain Arthur Fenner for his son Major Thomas Fenner (1652–1718). The house was added to the National Register of Historic Places in 1990. The House is available for short stays by those interested in the historical and architectural significance of the property. It also is made available to educational groups to visit and study.

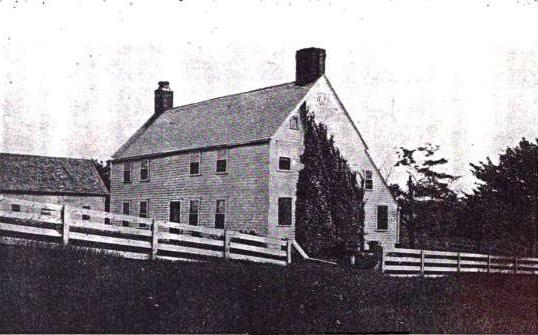
Fenner House in ca. 1900

Captain Arthur Fenner's original homestead, which was known as "Fenner Castle" (circa 1652) was burnt to the ground in King Philip's War. Captain Arthur was appointed Captain of the militia and his son Thomas was appointed Major. They were among a small handful of men "one who staid and went not away" in the defense of Providence. After the war, in 1677, Arthur rebuilt his home also built, for his son, the Major Thomas Fenner house. The "Fenner Castle" stood until 1896 when the chimney was demolished. Arthur's great-grandson, Thomas's grandson) was Governor Arthur Fenner who donated a piece of wood from Captain Arthur's "Fenner Castle" for what is now the RI Mace. He did so to honor his grandfather, Captain Arthur Fenner who so bravely defended Providence from the Indians.

== See also ==
- National Register of Historic Places listings in Providence County, Rhode Island
