= Eleazer Arnold House =

Historic house in Rhode Island, United States

- U.S. National Register of Historic Places
- U.S. National Historic Landmark
- U.S. Historic district – Contributing property
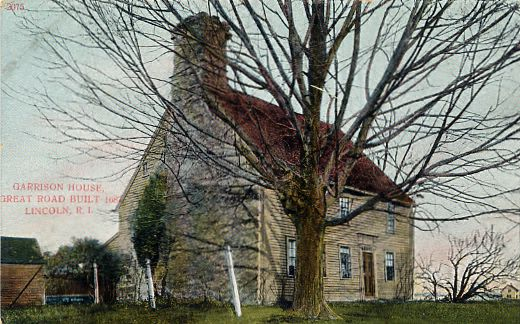
- 1909 postcard

- Location within Rhode Island Location within the United States
- Location: 487 Great Road, Lincoln, Rhode Island
- Coordinates: 41°54′10″N 71°25′14″W
- Built: c. 1693
- Architect: unknown
- Architectural style: Colonial
- Part of: Great Road Historic District (ID74000051)
- NRHP reference No.: 68000006

Significant dates
- Added to NRHP: November 24, 1968
- Designated NHL: November 24, 1968
- Designated CP: July 22, 1974

The Eleazer Arnold House is a historic house built for Eleazer Arnold in about 1693, and located in the Great Road Historic District at Lincoln, Rhode Island. It is now a National Historic Landmark owned by Historic New England, and open to the public on weekends.

The house is a relatively large "stone-ender," a building type brought from the western part of England and used most commonly in northern Rhode Island. This geographic-specific aspect may have been due to the attribution of the work to John Smith "the Mason" of Smithfield, Rhode Island and his family. It was built two stories in height, with four rooms on each floor, a lean-to, exposed fieldstone end-walls, wooden side-walls, and a pilastered chimney. By the 20th century, a gable had been added to the structure.

In 1919, the house was donated to Historic New England (then the Society for the Preservation of New England Antiquities) by Preserved Whipple Arnold. It has since undergone two phases of restoration. In 1920 the first stabilization efforts were led by Norman Isham; and in 1950, the house and chimney received a thorough structural rehabilitation. In this second restoration, later alterations were removed to return the building to its 17th-century appearance.

The house was listed on the National Register of Historic Places in 1968, and was declared a National Historic Landmark in 1974 for its architectural significance. In 2005 a dendrochronology survey of the tree rings confirmed the 1693 construction date.

Today, the building closely resembles its form during the early settlement in Rhode Island, though some details, including the leaded glass windows and the front door and its surround, are 20th-century replacements.

== Images ==
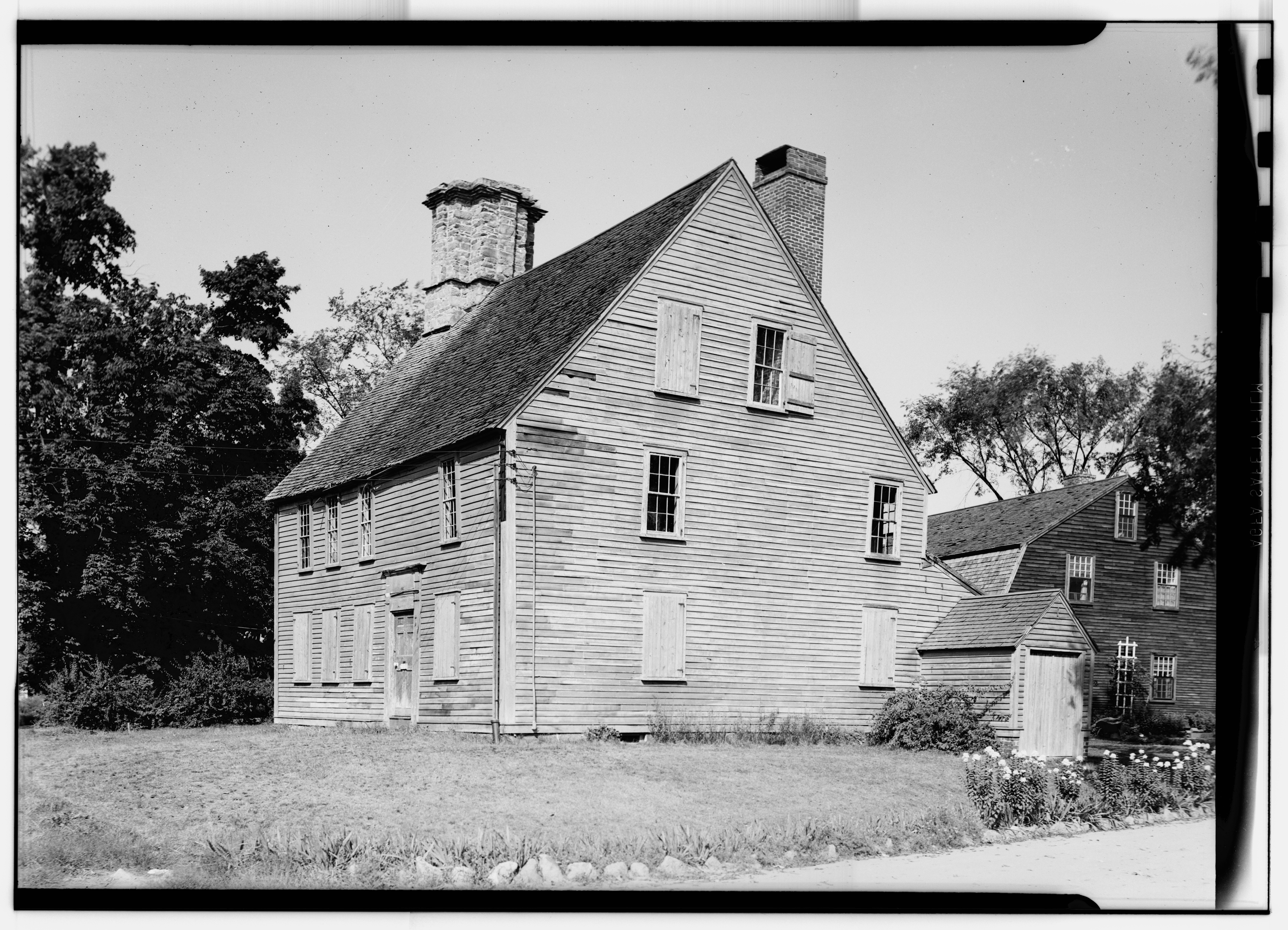
View from the Southeast in 1941

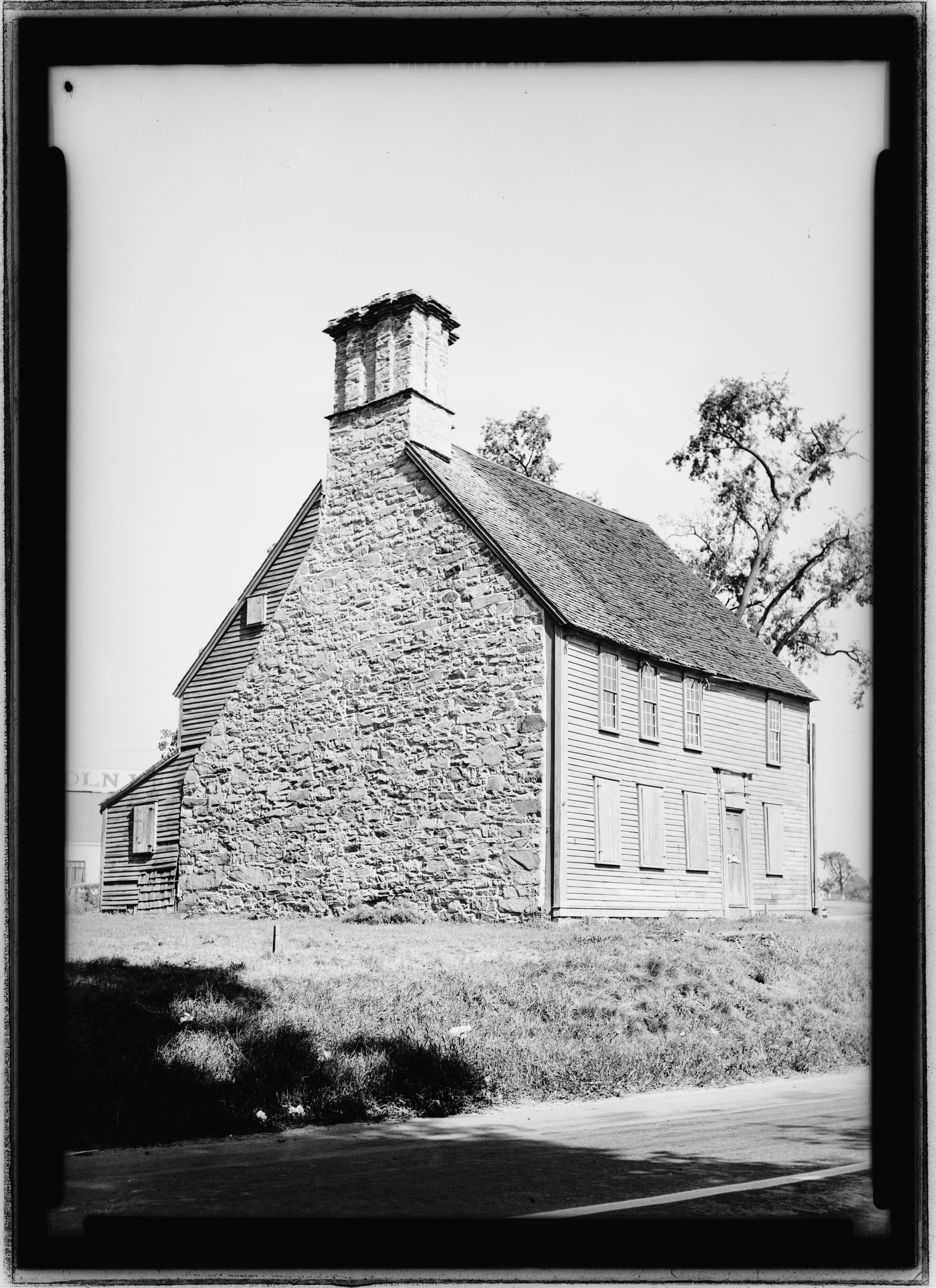
View from the Southwest in 1941

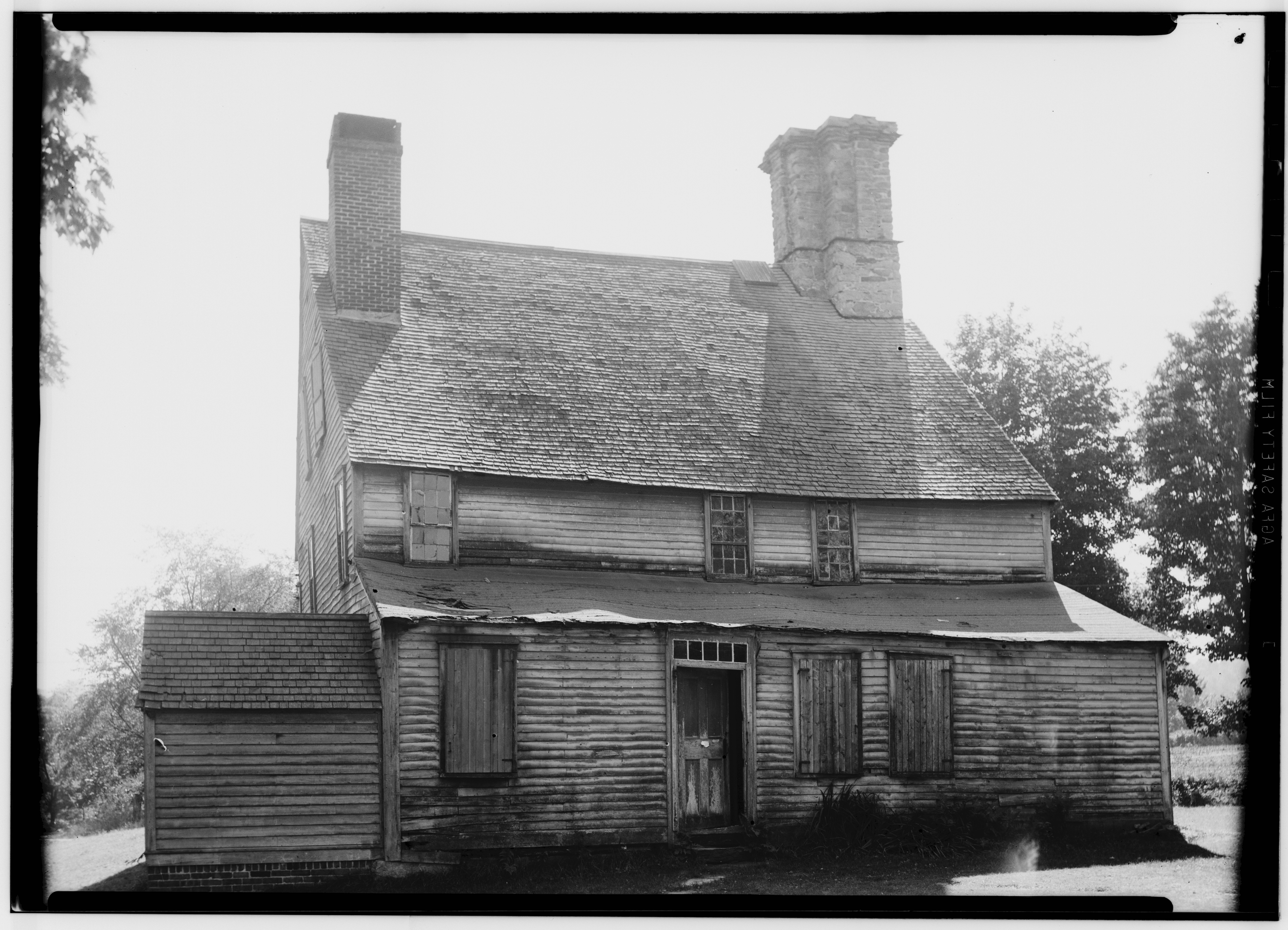
View from the North in 1941

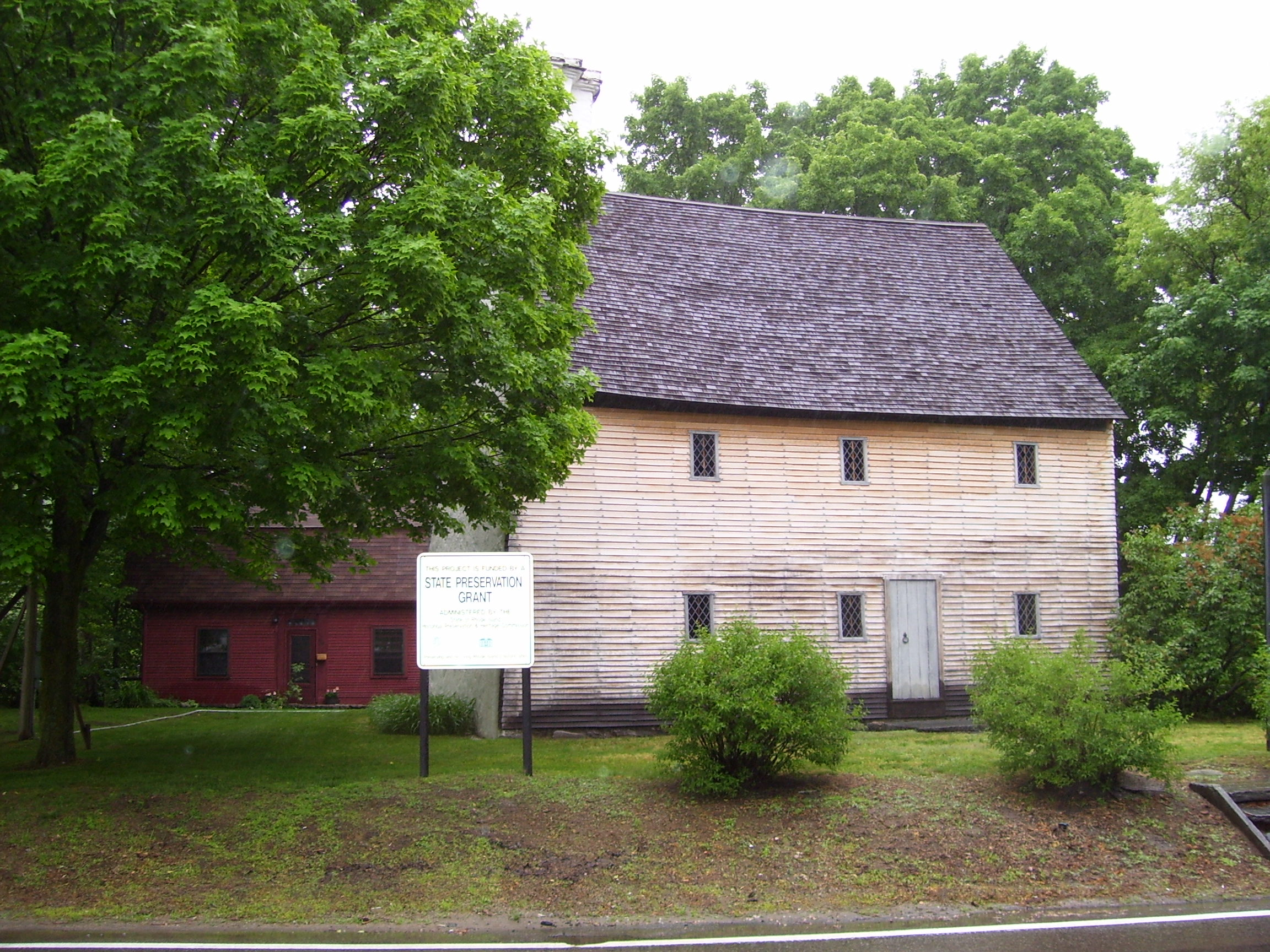
Arnold House in 2008

== See also ==
- Clemence-Irons House, another nearby Rhode Island stone-ender
- National Register of Historic Places listings in Providence County, Rhode Island
- List of National Historic Landmarks in Rhode Island
- List of the oldest buildings in Rhode Island
