= Roger Mowry Tavern =

American historic building (1653–1900)

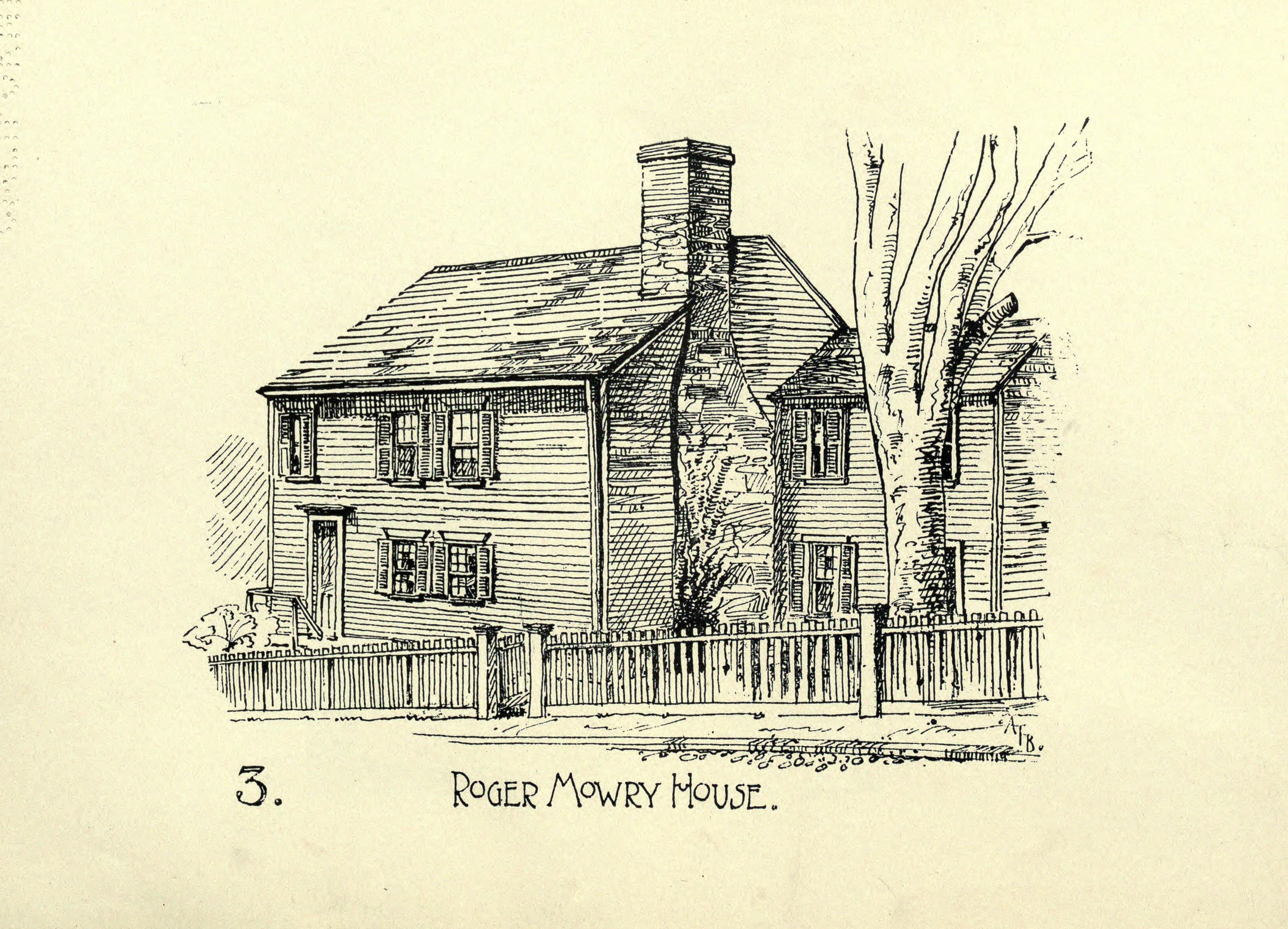
- Interactive map of the Roger Mowry Tavern area

General information
- Architectural style: Stone ender
- Location: Providence, Rhode Island, US
- Coordinates: 41.8427°N 71.4072°W
- Construction started: 1653; 373 years ago
- Renovated: 1895
- Demolished: 1900

Renovating team
- Architect: Norman Isham

The Roger Mowry Tavern, also known variously as the Roger Mowry House and Abbott House, was a historic stone ender house, built around 1653, in Providence, Rhode Island. Roger Mowry was a constable and operated the only tavern in the town. The tavern also served as a government meeting place, church, and jail. It was originally constructed as a 1 1/2-story single room house with a chamber upstairs. By 1711, the house was expanded with a two-story lean-to. At an unknown later date, the top of the roof of the original house was raised up further. A reconstruction of the original house was proposed by Norman Isham in 1895^{[8]}. The Roger Mowry Tavern was the oldest house in Providence until it was demolished in 1900.

== Roger Mowry ==
The first American records of Roger Mowry appear in Boston, Massachusetts. On May 18, 1631, a document stated Mowry's desire to be a freeman. Mowry would move to Plymouth and later Salem before arriving in Providence, Rhode Island. Mowry lived in Salem between 1636 and 1649, with his wife Mary, the eldest daughter of John Johnson of Roxbury. In 1637, Mowry acquired 50 acres (0.20 km^{2}) of land some two miles from the Salem settlement and built his house on the lot which was to be the corner of Essex and Flint Street. About 1653, Mowry constructed a house which would come to be known as the Roger Mowry Tavern. In 1655, Mowry became a freeman in Providence and resided there until his death on January 5, 1666. Records show that Roger Mowry was the tavernkeeper and constable. A family monument lists Mowry as having twelve children, with one child, Benjamin, reportedly having been found and baptized by Mowry.

== Design ==
The original architect of the Roger Mowry Tavern is not known for certain. Robert A. Geake's book Historic Taverns of Rhode Island suggests it may have been the work of William Carpenter and the mason John Smith. The original house began as a 1 1/2-story stone ender with a single 16 feet (4.9 m) by roughly 17 feet (5.2 m) fire room. Running lengthwise across the middle of the room is a large summer beam. On the right side of the fireplace was the stairs or ladder that lead to the upstairs chamber. At an unknown date, the roof of the original house was extended higher, as evidenced by the original beams ending about 3 feet (0.91 m) above the floor. By 1711, the house had a two-story lean-to. By the late 19th century the house had been greatly altered, but the original structure was restored by Robert Isham. Isham found and restored the house, which still featured the original posts and beams. The large fireplace remained intact, but was concealed behind a fireboard and closet, that was itself behind a stove. The result was that stone fireplace was completely concealed prior to restoration. Less than a decade later after Isham restored the original part of the house, the whole structure was demolished.

== History ==
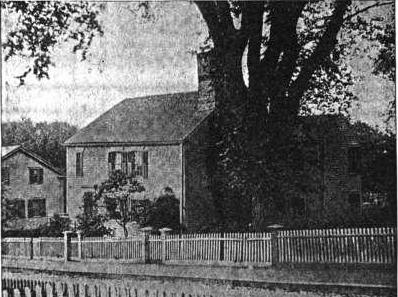
Roger Mowry Tavern in ca. 1885

Roger Mowry was licensed to operate a "house of entertainment" in May 1655. The tavern may have been a contributing reason for the passage of a law that mandated no alcoholic drinks be served after 9 p.m. under penalty of a fine, unless a satisfactory reason was given to the constable or magistrate.

Roger Mowry's Tavern was reportedly the site of civil rally to free a man taken prisoner by a Massachusetts constable. The constable, whose intention was to extradite his prisoner back to Massachusetts for prosecution was staying at the nearby Roger Pray's tavern when concerned citizens gathered at Mowry's tavern. The citizens summoned the town council, and a messenger was sent to the Massachusetts constable to demand by what authority he held his prisoner. The result was the release of the prisoner. Another story surrounding the tavern was the murder of John Clawson, a Dutch carpenter, who was found dying one December morning in 1661. A native Indian, Waumanitt, was charged with the crime and held at Mowry's tavern until the matter could be resolved, but it is unknown what fate befell Waumanitt. According to locals, Clawson was roused and accused his neighbor, Hearndon, for his murder. Clawson then cursed the family before dying. The house was also reported to have been used by the Town Council for meetings, with a record of payment in 1657 from the Town Treasurer.

Upon Mowry's death, his wife retained the house until selling it to Stephen Paine on September 5, 1671. Paine conveyed it to Samuel Whipple who resided in the house until his death in 1711. Upon his death the house was recorded as having a two-story lean-to. Whipple transferred the property to his wife and upon her death, which passed to their daughters Abigail and Hope Whipple. Hope Whipple would marry Robert Currie and upon her death, Robert Currie would marry her sister Abigail Whipple, and upon her death fell to Robert Currie's ownership. In 1737, Currie sold the house to William Smith, Job Whipple and John Whipple. It remained in the Whipple family until 1761 when it was sold to Captain Joseph Owen. The house would take its final name, the Abbott House, from Thomas Abbott who married Joseph Owen's daughter and resided in the house until his death in 1826. The Mowry Tavern was allegedly one of only five buildings not burned by the Indians during King Philip's War. It is believed that it was spared because Roger Williams, a friend of the Indians, held Christian worship services in the building. The house was located on Abbott Street adjacent to the North Burial Ground. The entire structure was demolished in 1900 to construct a triple decker tenement house. At the time of its demolition, it was the oldest house in Providence.

== Gallery ==
Mowry Tavern, ca. 1650, in Providence near North Burial Ground (demolished c.1900)

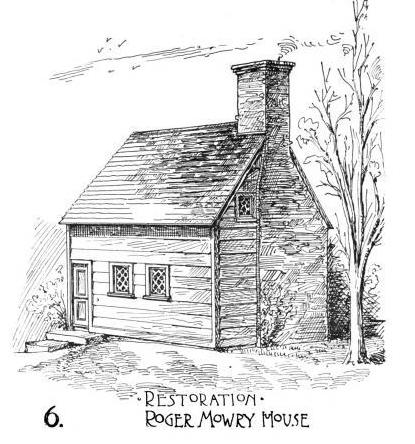
Mowry House as is originally appeared according to Norman Isham

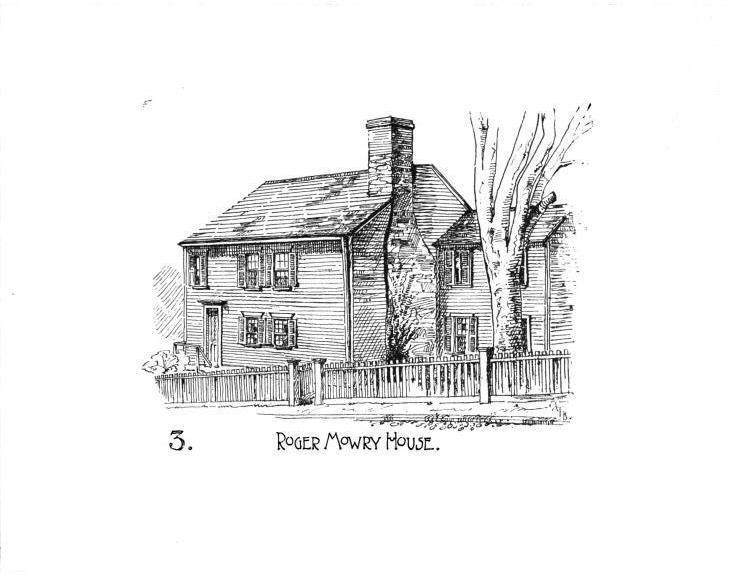
Mowry House before its demolition

Norman Isham's diagram of the 1653 Mowry House from his 1895 book

== See also ==
- List of the oldest buildings in Rhode Island
