= Greene–Bowen House =

Historic house in Rhode Island, United States

- U.S. National Register of Historic Places
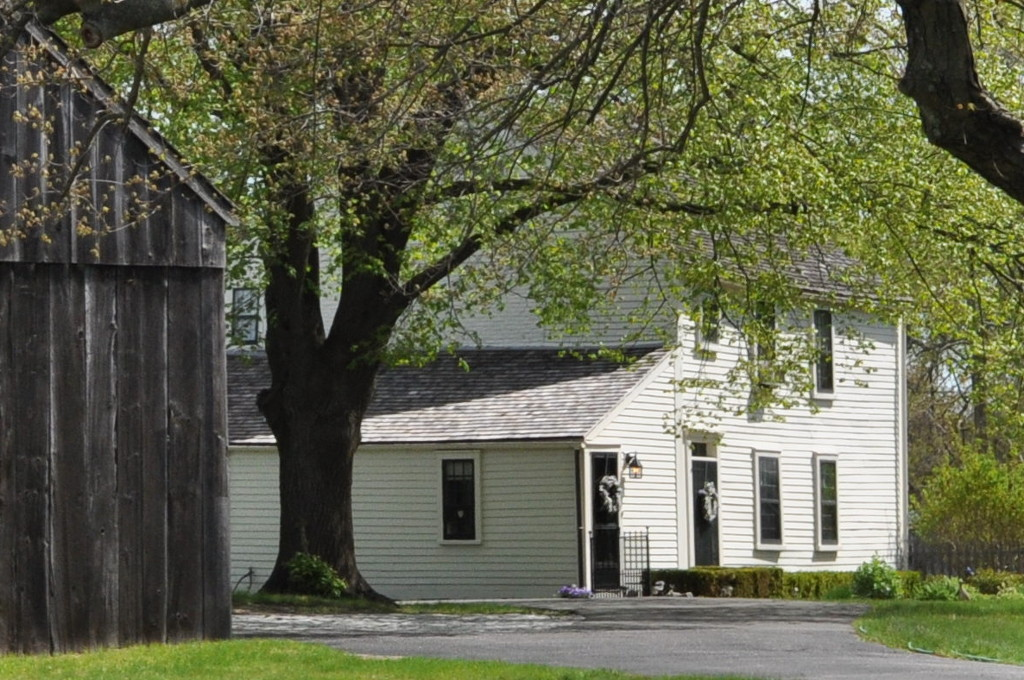

- Location within Rhode Island Location within the United States
- Location: 100 Mill Wheel Rd., Warwick, Rhode Island
- Coordinates: 41°41′26″N 71°25′19″W
- Area: 15.3 acres (6.2 ha)
- Built: 1715
- NRHP reference No.: 74000038
- Added to NRHP: May 02, 1974

The Green–Bowen House is a historic house at 100 Mill Wheel Road in Warwick, Rhode Island, United States. It is a late-date stone-ender house, built c. 1715, and is the oldest surviving house of the locally historically prominent Greene family. It stands on land purchased by John Greene from local Native Americans in 1642, and was probably built by Fones Greene not long after he acquired the land in this area in the early 18th century. The house has a two-story main block, with two rooms on each floor, and its west wall and chimney are built of brick instead of stone. Shed-roof additions dating to 18th century were added abutting the west side and the rear. The property it stands on includes a 20th-century house, and a 19th-century barn and cottage.

The house was listed on the National Register of Historic Places in 1974.

== See also ==
- National Register of Historic Places listings in Kent County, Rhode Island
