= Clement Weaver–Daniel Howland House =

Historic house in Rhode Island, United States

- U.S. National Register of Historic Places
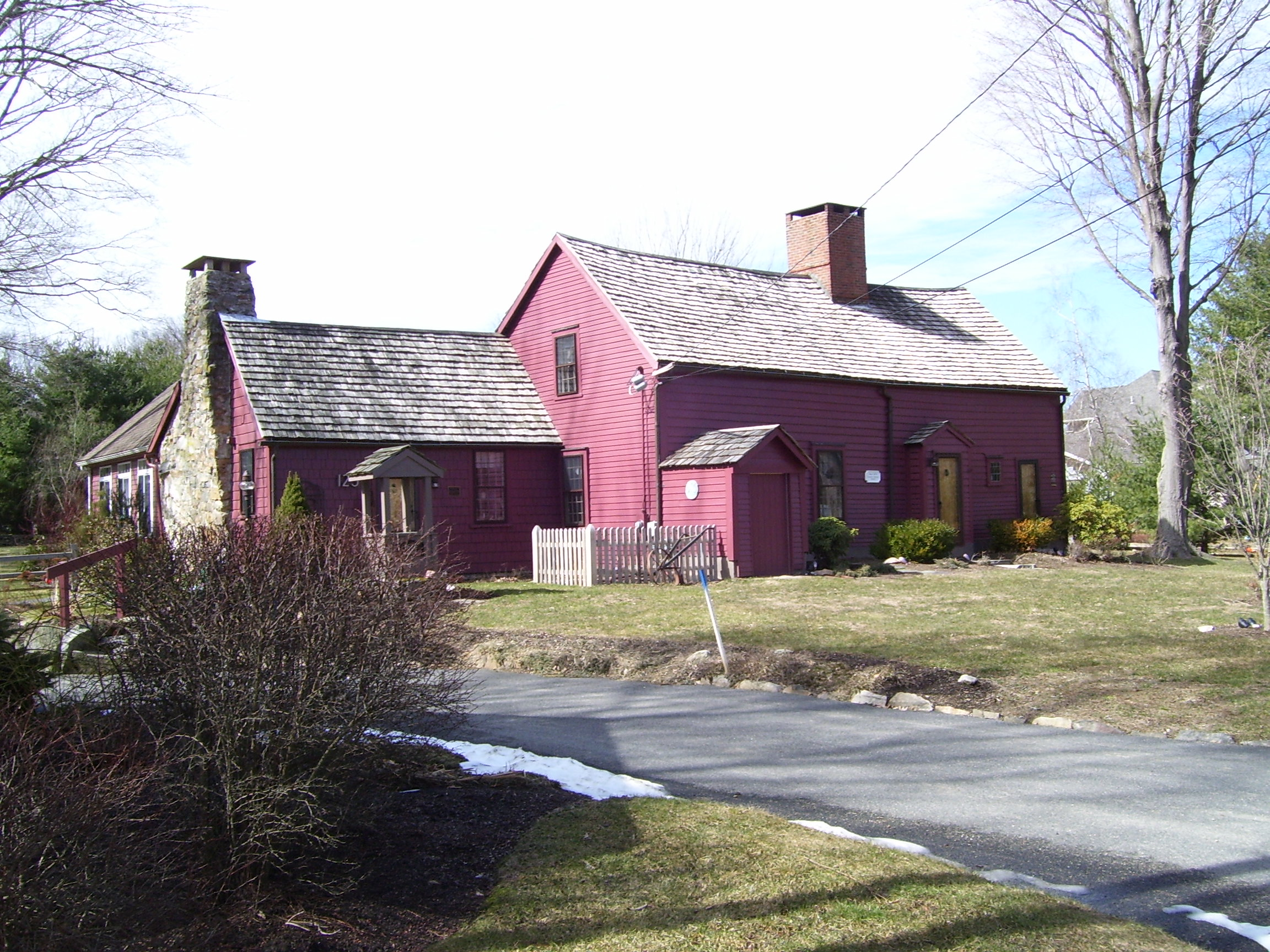
- House pictured in 2009 from Howland Road

- Location within Rhode Island Location within the United States
- Location: East Greenwich, Rhode Island
- Coordinates: 41°39′32″N 71°28′37″W
- Built: 1679
- Architect: None
- Architectural style: Traditional saltbox design
- Restored: 1930s; 1996
- Restored by: Norman Isham; Larry Schneider
- NRHP reference No.: 95001266
- Added to NRHP: November 7, 1995

The Clement Weaver–Daniel Howland House is a historic stone-ender timber frame house built in 1679. This rare example of primitive 17th-century architecture is located at 125 Howland Road in East Greenwich, Rhode Island. It is the oldest documented dwelling house in Kent County and the second oldest home in Rhode Island.

Clement Weaver was a native of Newport in the Colony of Rhode Island, and built the house in 1679 after fighting in King Philip's War. His descendants sold the house to Daniel Howland in 1748. Howland was a grandson of Henry Howland who arrived in Plymouth Colony in 1624. Henry's brother was John Howland, one of the original Mayflower Pilgrims of 1620.

The house was included in the Historic American Buildings Survey, the first national preservation program, begun in 1933 to document America's architectural heritage. Several years later, Brown University professor Norman Isham began a comprehensive restoration of the house.

The house was listed on the National Register of Historic Places in 1995.

== History ==
Clement III was a grandson of Clement Weaver who moved from Glastonbury, England, to Newport, Rhode Island. Clement Weaver III was one of fifty veterans of the King Philip's War of 1675–1677 given large parcels of land in what was then a barren outpost now known as East Greenwich." This made Clement one of the town's original grantees. Clement Weaver and his young wife Rachel Andrews moved in the winter of 1679 to his 107.25 acres (43.40 hectares) of land "by the sea," where he built the house only two years after the official founding of the town of East Greenwich. His home remains a rare and unique architectural showplace.

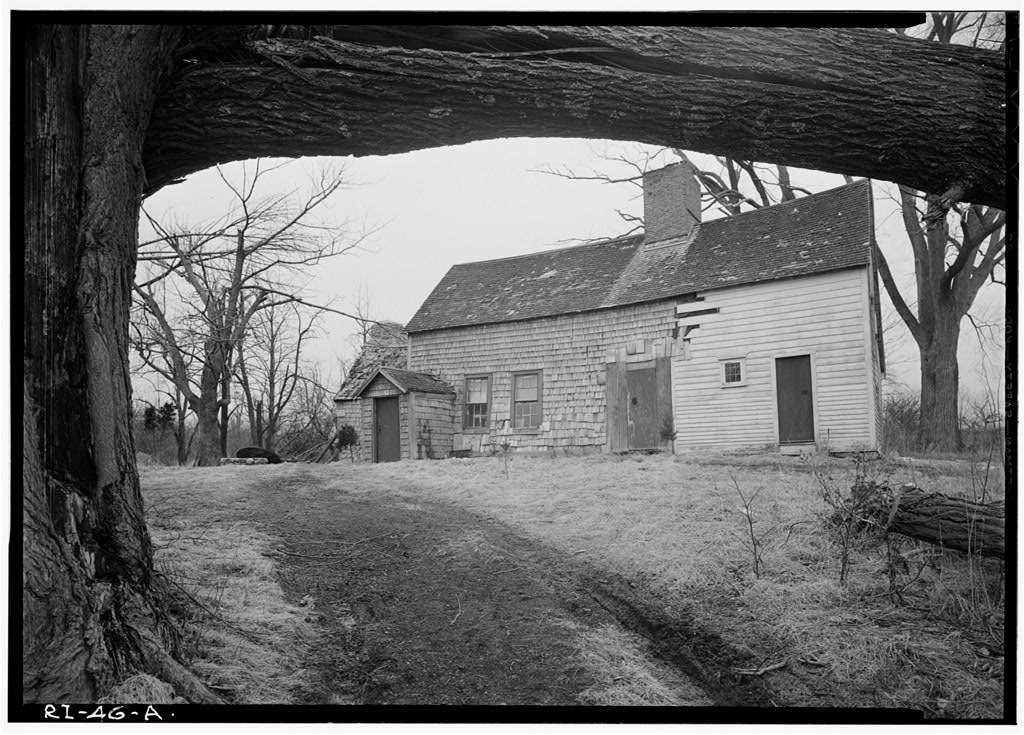
Clement Weaver House in the early 20th century

Clement Weaver's family of eight children grew up in this little farmhouse. His son, Joseph, succeeded him with his own family of four. Up until the mid-19th century, several generations of Weavers had run the old White Horse Tavern (no longer standing) on Division Street in East Greenwich. This tavern may have been related to the White Horse Tavern of the same time period in Newport, Rhode Island. Three descendants of the original Clement Weaver served during World War I.

In 1748, Daniel Howland purchased the home from the Weavers. Daniel Howland was a Quaker and chaplain during the Revolutionary War. Daniel willed the house to his son Daniel and his wife, Philadelphia of Portsmouth, Rhode Island. The house remained with the Howlands for nearly two centuries.

While most of the outbuildings have since disappeared, there remains a building that was originally a horse barn. After the Hurricane of 1938, this barn was converted into a smaller barn with an attached two-car garage. From the street, this building still retains its older look. There is also a modern barn on the property which now serves as a private library.

== Structure description ==
The house was first built as a one-room plan, one-and-a-half stories high. The walls of the house were constructed using wide vertical boards over a post and beam structure. There are indications that four additions were made to the house prior to 1712. About a year after it was originally built, the first addition was a one-story lean-to along the northern side of the house. This was to become the original kitchen. This lean-to was brought up to the height of the original house in 1681 to create two garrets above with a center chimney and entry. The chimney of stone and homemade brick was never exposed on the outside end of the house. Another lean-to was built along the back (western side) of the house to create the traditional salt-box shape remaining today.

Brown professor Norman Isham, well known for his work preserving and restoring Colonial-era homes and structures in Rhode Island, was commissioned by the Howlands to restore the Weaver farm house in the 1930s. The Howlands donated the restored home to the Society for Preservation of New England Antiquities (SPNEA, now Historic New England) as a memorial to Daniel Howland. During Isham's restoration, workers found the original builder had used seaweed for insulation.

The first lean-to addition was the first room restored during Isham's 1930's restoration. The entirely restored room, known as the "museum room," presents an excellent picture of a 17th-century residential interior in Rhode Island. This room contains two of the original square-shaped, single casement, leaded glass windows. These windows were carefully restored and re-hung where originally located to provide some of the best evidence available of 17th-century windows. The room retains the huge fireplace surrounded by many of the original hand-planed, feather-edged, vertical pine boards, along with batten doors with wooden latches and strap hinges. The ceiling is exposed oak beam and both the floor and ceiling above are wideboard.

The last 'original' addition of a single-story kitchen ell with a stone-end chimney of its own was made about 1712. These particularly constructed chimneys were later referred to as "Rhode Island stone-enders." Only a couple of these chimneys survive. The ell was built off of the southern wall of the keeping room. This latest kitchen has an enormous fireplace with a small oven. There is outside evidence of an original beehive oven which may have either fallen or been removed.

The keeping room of the original house is its largest room and has an impressive system of framing with its original posts, girts, and exposed summer beams of solid oak and chestnut. The ceiling is exposed beam. The wide board wall sheathing was at some point covered with plaster as it remains today. There is also a very early corner cupboard opposite the enormous fireplace. It has what appears to be the original, planed, single plank, batten door along with two hand-wrought, butterfly hinges. The oak chimney trees (fireplace lintels) throughout the home are enormous as well as completely petrified. This author's own observation, far less than scientific, would indicate that based on the size of the trees used in construction as well as when they were installed, would make much of the wood in the house close to a millennium old.

The sheathed entry hall between the keeping room and the older kitchen contains a rare "split" staircase. To one side the staircase contains six steps while the other contains seven. These staircases were built at different times to reach the garret above the older kitchen, now the museum room. Stairway sheathing was carefully cut on a diagonal to facilitate the moving of furniture. All of what appear to be the original vertical boards are still there.

The Howlands willed the home to SPNEA to be restored and opened as a museum. Correspondence maintained by (formerly-named) SPNEA, indicates the home was returned to Mrs. Howland when it became too expensive for the organization to maintain. It is believed that the rest of the house was then restored by Isham for its new owners in the 1930s.

The home contains six fireplaces. The kitchen, keeping room and museum room all have fireplaces almost ten feet wide and five feet tall. The museum room fireplace has a round top oven built into the back wall. Both garrets (bedrooms) above each possess a fireplace. The room currently being used as a dining room has a smaller fireplace believed to have been appropriated for the heating system exhaust.

The southern wall of the main house retains several original clapboards preserved when the 1712 kitchen ell was added on. These original hand-riven clapboards appear to be made of oak and have been feathered and lapped while being fastened to the vertical sheathing with large, hand-wrought nails. One must go into the eaves behind the garrets and walk into the attic space above the kitchen ell to view these clapboards.

An addition was built off the back of the kitchen which sits perpendicular to the main house. This addition follows guidelines of the U.S. Department of the Interior Restoration Standards and the local historical board of review. While 'modern' in design, the room was built in such a way that it could be "unzipped" from the original house. The guidelines specify additions constructed on a historically significant house must be done in such a way as to reflect the present period style to avoid confusing future historians as to when the addition was actually built.

Pictures of the house before its restoration in the 1930s can be found on the Library of Congress website.

The recent non-fiction book Killed Strangely by Elaine Crane indicates Clement Weaver served as a juror in the murder trial of Rebecca Cornell from the family of Cornell University fame. The book includes information from Jane Fiske's edition of Rhode Island Court Records, and a photograph of the "museum room" fireplace as a comparison to the home Cornell was murdered in.

== See also ==
- National Register of Historic Places listings in Kent County, Rhode Island
- List of the oldest buildings in Rhode Island
- Stone Ender
