= Norman Isham =

American architect (1864–1943)

Norman Morrison Isham
- Born: November 12, 1864
- Died: January 1, 1943 (aged 78); Wickford, Rhode Island
- Resting place: Elm Grove Cemetery in North Kingstown, Rhode Island
- Education: Brown University
- Occupations: architectural historian, preservationist, author
- Known for: Preservation of colonial-era buildings in Rhode Island

Isham's diagram of the 1653 Mowry House, a stone-ender in Providence, Rhode Island from his 1895 book

Norman Morrison Isham (1864–1943) was a prominent architectural historian, author, and professor at Brown University and Rhode Island School of Design (RISD). He was an ardent preservationist and a pioneer in the study of early American architecture.

== Biography ==
Norman M. Isham was born in Hartford, Connecticut on November 12, 1864, to Dr. Henry and Frances Elizabeth (Smyth) Isham. As a child his family moved to Providence, Rhode Island. Norman Isham attended Mowry and Goff's preparatory school and Brown University. At Brown he received a A.B. in 1886 and an A.M. in Architecture in 1890. After graduation in 1886, Isham worked for architectural firm of Stone, Carpenter & Willson and later Martin & Hall. He also served as an architecture instructor at Brown University.

In 1899 Isham and Benjamin Wright created an architecture partnership which existed from 1912 to 1920 and 1923 to 1933. Isham chaired the architectural department at the Rhode Island School of Design starting in 1912. He was a member of the American Institute of Architects and the Royal Institute of British Architects and published several architecture texts, including "Early Rhode Island Houses" in 1895. Isham was well known for his renovations of many prominent early Rhode Island and other New England houses, particularly, stone-enders.

After Isham's wife, Elizabeth Barbour Ormsbee, died in 1917, he moved from Providence to Wickford, Rhode Island. There, he constructed a two-story, shingle-style Colonial Revival home on Boston Neck Road. Initially, it was a summer home, but he moved there permanently after the death of his wife.

Isham was a consultant on the building of the American Wing of the Metropolitan Museum of Art in New York, and was a consulting architect on the Delaware Legislative Hall, 1930–1933.

== Memberships and societies ==
- Member of the General Society of Colonial Wars
- Elected to the Walpole Society in 1911
- Elected to the American Antiquarian Society in 1933

== Historic preservation ==
Norman Isham is perhaps best known for his work preserving and restoring Colonial-era homes and structures in Rhode Island. He wrote extensively on the topic of Colonial architecture and furniture. His books Early Rhode Island Houses, published with Albert F. Brown in 1895, and Early Connecticut Houses, published in 1900, are classics in their field.

Some of the buildings Isham worked to preserve include:

- Bullock-Thomas House, North Kingstown, Rhode Island
- Clemence-Irons House, Johnston, Rhode Island, 1691
- Smith's Castle, Wickford, Rhode Island, 1678
- Clement Weaver House, East Greenwich, Rhode Island, 1679
- John Balch House, Beverly, Massachusetts, 1679
- Eleazer Arnold House, Lincoln, Rhode Island, 1693
- John Randall House, North Stonington, Connecticut, 1690
- Joshua Babcock–Smith House, Westerly, Rhode Island, 1734
- General Nathanael Greene Homestead, Coventry, Rhode Island, 1774
- Gilbert Stuart Birthplace, Saunderstown, Rhode Island, 1751
- Hyland House, Guilford, Connecticut, 1713
- John Updike House, North Kingstown, Rhode Island
- Newport Colony House, Newport, Rhode Island, 1739
- Old City Hall, Newport, Rhode Island, 1762
- Newport Brick Market, Newport, Rhode Island, 1762
- Stephen Hopkins House, Providence, Rhode Island, 1708
- Redwood Library, Newport, Rhode Island, 1747
- Trinity Church (Newport, Rhode Island), 1724
- University Hall, Brown University
- Wanton-Lyman-Hazard House, Newport, Rhode Island, 1697
- Whitehall Museum House, Middletown, Rhode Island, 1729

== Death and burial ==
Norman Isham died on January 1, 1943. His funeral attracted many renowned architects to Wickford to pay their respects. Tragically, fellow Providence architect Harry Slocomb suffered a heart attack and died after Isham's funeral service.

Isham is buried with his wife and parents at Elm Grove Cemetery in North Kingstown, Rhode Island. He left no descendants.
