= Oaklawn, Rhode Island =

- Oak Lawn Village Historic District
- U.S. National Register of Historic Places
- U.S. Historic district
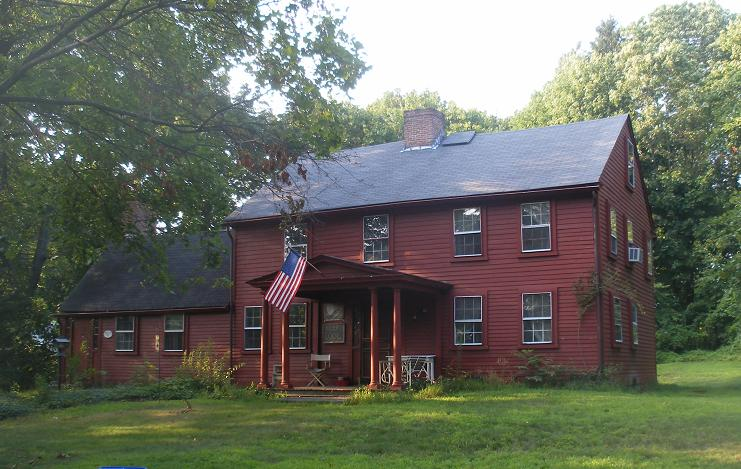
- The Edward Searle House

- Location within Rhode Island Location within the United States
- Location: Wilbur Ave. from Natick Rd. to Oaklawn Ave., includes Searle, Exchange, and Wheelock Sts., Cranston, Rhode Island
- Coordinates: 41°44′57″N 71°29′6″W
- Area: 30 acres (12 ha)
- Architectural style: Greek Revival, Late Victorian, Colonial
- NRHP reference No.: 77000004
- Added to NRHP: November 25, 1977

Oak Lawn or Oaklawn is a historical village in southwest Cranston, Rhode Island. Before being named "Oak Lawn" in 1872 the area was known as "Searle's Corner". The Edward Searle House, built in 1677, and one of the oldest standing structures in Rhode Island, is located in Oak Lawn. The village is known for its annual May Breakfast, a New England tradition that began in Oak Lawn in 1865 as a way for the members of the Oak Lawn Baptist Church to raise money for local American Civil War veterans. The 1855 Herman Melville novel "Israel Potter" is based on the life and adventures of an American Revolutionary soldier who was raised on a farm near present-day Oak Lawn. Oak Lawn is also the site of an important archeological excavation: in the 1950s archeologists discovered bowls and other Native American artifacts, carved from soapstone and dating back more than 10,000 years. In the pre-colonial era the area was populated with bands of the Narragansett Indians known as the "Meshanticut" and "Natick" Indians.

Much of the village was designated a historic district by the city of Cranston, and a section of the village, extending along Wilbur Avenue from Natick Road to Exchange Street, was listed on the National Register of Historic Places in 1977 as the Oak Lawn Historic District.

== See also ==
- National Register of Historic Places listings in Providence County, Rhode Island
