= Armand LaMontagne =

American artist (1938–2025)

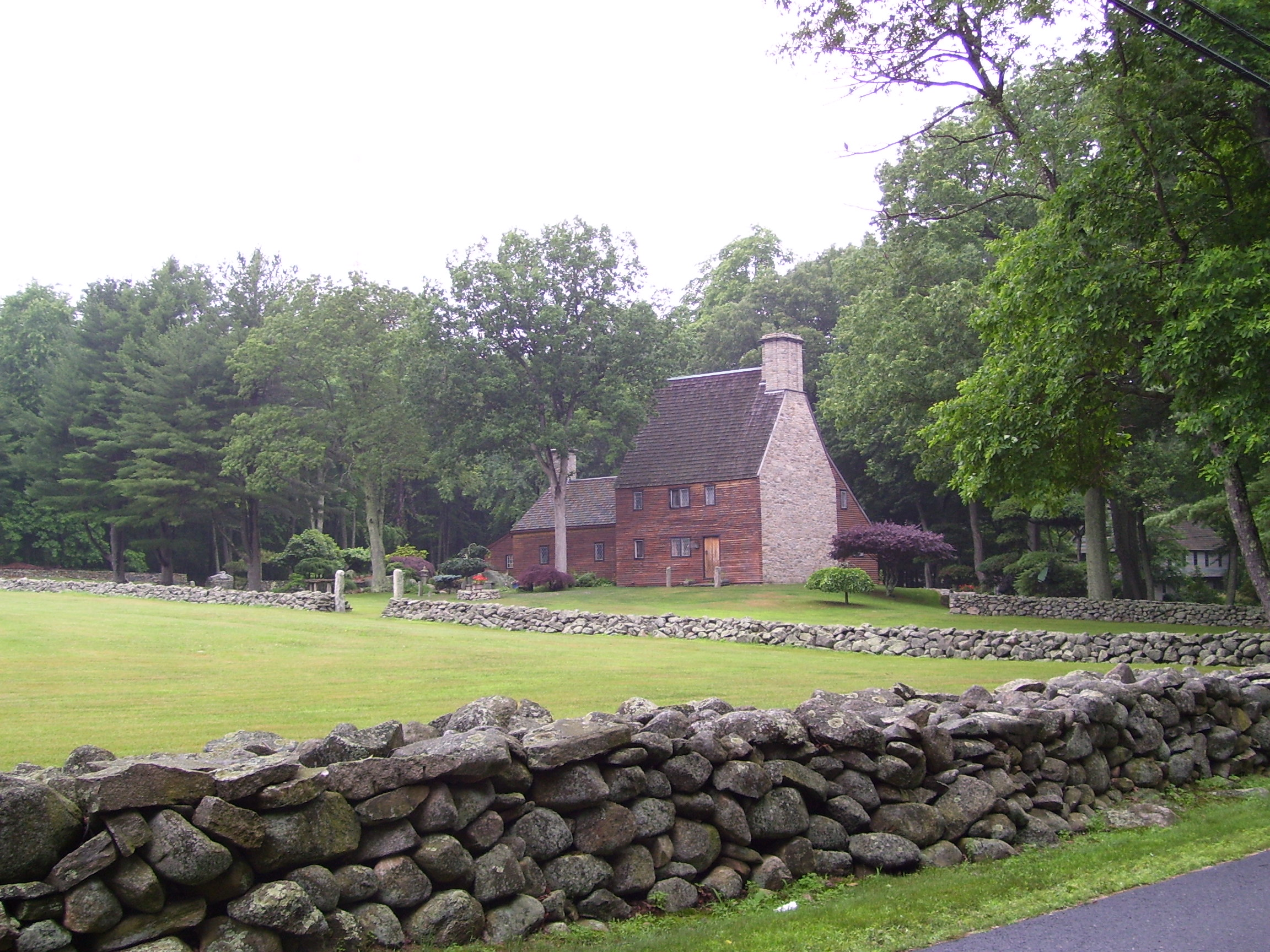
Armand Lamontagne's stone ender farm in Scituate, Rhode Island

Armand Maurice LaMontagne (February 3, 1938 – March 7, 2025) was an American sculptor of celebrated personalities.

== Background ==
Armand Maurice LaMontagne was born in Pawtucket, Rhode Island, on February 3, 1938, and was a graduate of Worcester Academy and Boston College. He was a self-taught artist who has honed his skills through practicing his profession, which he began pursuing after serving in the U.S. Army. He studied his craft in Florence.

LaMontagne and his wife, Lorraine (née Robitaille), had a daughter. A resident of North Scituate, Rhode Island, he died from heart failure at home on March 7, 2025, at the age of 87.

== Body of work ==
LaMontagne is best recognized for his realistic, life-sized wood and bronze sculptures. Lamontagne long focused on New England sporting legends as subjects of his work, including Ted Williams, Larry Bird, Bobby Orr, Carl Yastrzemski, and Harry Agganis. Writer Saul Wisnia described Lamontagne's wood sculpture in Sports Illustrated: "With hair, clothes and shoes all carved from single 1,800-to-2,500-pound blocks of basswood, LaMontagne's works often leave viewers staring in disbelief at what appears to be real skin, wool and leather. Sometimes amazement gives way to emotion; upon seeing his statue in 1985, the notoriously rough-edged Williams broke down and cried." His works are on permanent display in the collections of The Baseball Hall of Fame, Cooperstown, New York; the New England Sports Museum, Boston, Massachusetts; the Patton Museum of Cavalry and Armor, Fort Knox, Kentucky; and the Basketball Hall of Fame, Springfield, Massachusetts.

LaMontagne's talents were brought to the national spotlight in the 1970s when he deliberately made a reproduction of a 17th-century turned oak Brewster Chair (an iconic Pilgrim chair) to embarrass the self-proclaimed experts. LaMontagne even soaked the chair in salt water to simulate aging. He then gave the chair away, and the Henry Ford Museum eventually purchased it from a dealer for $9,000. The museum was notified of their error when LaMontagne published an admission in the Providence Journal.

In 1973, LaMontagne built a large crucifix for Saint Joseph Roman Catholic Church in Scituate, Rhode Island. He also built a replica 17th-century Rhode Island house called a stone ender in Scituate, Rhode Island.
