= Edward Searle House =

Coordinates: 41°44′54″N 71°28′56″W

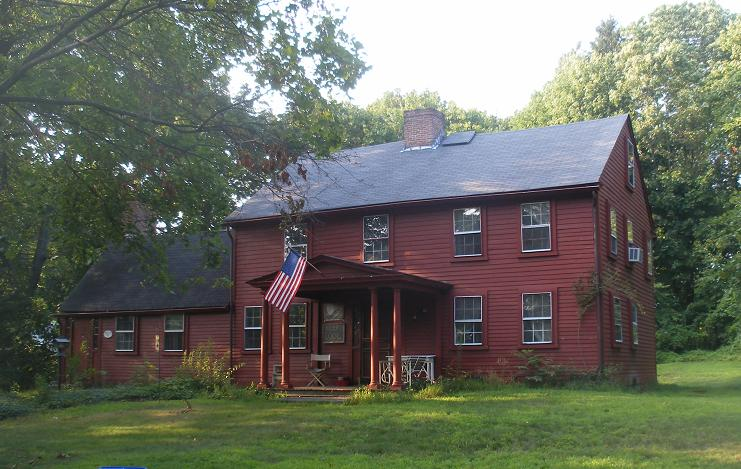
- Interactive map of the Edward Searle House area

General information
- Type: House
- Architectural style: Stone ender
- Location: Oaklawn Village, Cranston, Rhode Island
- Construction started: 1677
- Owner: Privately owned

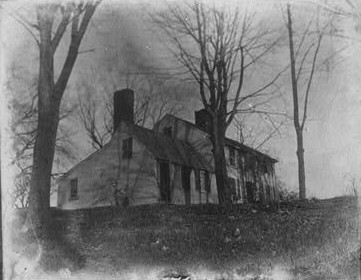
Edward Searle House before 1900

The Edward Searle House is an historic stone ender in Cranston, Rhode Island in the village of Oaklawn. The house is one of the oldest surviving buildings in the state.

The house was rebuilt in 1677 on the site of the original 1670 house off of the remaining Stone end and chimney which survived the burning by Native Americans during King Philip's War, and was remodeled around 1720. The 1 1/2-story gable-roofed stone-ender remains a part of the newer house. Edward Searle was a son-in-law of Thomas Ralph who was one of the original purchasers of the land from the Native Americans. The owner of the house has placed a large chalkboard on the front porch often containing messages for passers-by.

== See also ==
- List of the oldest buildings in Rhode Island
