= Joseph Smith House =

Historic house in Rhode Island, United States

- U.S. National Register of Historic Places
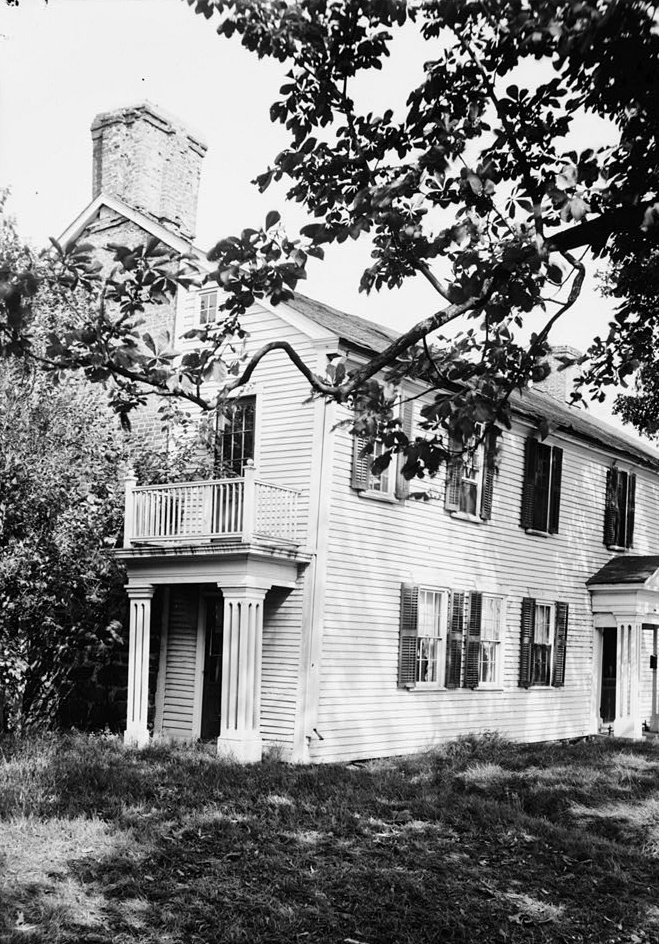
- Historic American Buildings Survey photo, unknown date

- Location within Rhode Island Location within the United States
- Location: North Providence, Rhode Island
- Coordinates: 41°51′22″N 71°27′0″W
- Built: 1705
- NRHP reference No.: 78000009
- Added to NRHP: November 28, 1978

The Joseph Smith House is a historic house at 109 Smithfield Road in North Providence, Rhode Island, United States. It is a 2½-story wood-frame house, six bays wide, with a shed-style addition to the rear giving it a saltbox appearance. The oldest portion of this house, built around 1705, is a classical Rhode Island stone-ender house, whose large chimney has since been completely enclosed in the structure. The lower levels of this chimney are believed to predate King Philip's War (1675–76), when the previous house was burned. The 1705 house was built by Joseph Smith, grandson of John Smith, the miller, one of Rhode Island's first settlers. It was greatly enlarged in 1762 by Daniel Jenckes, a judge from a prominent Rhode Island family, for his son, and was for many years in the hands of Jenckes' descendants. The house is the only known surviving stone-ender in North Providence.

The house was listed on the National Register of Historic Places in 1978.

== See also ==
- National Register of Historic Places listings in Providence County, Rhode Island
- Stone-ender
