= Valentine Whitman House =

Coordinates: 41.931843°N 71.456664°W

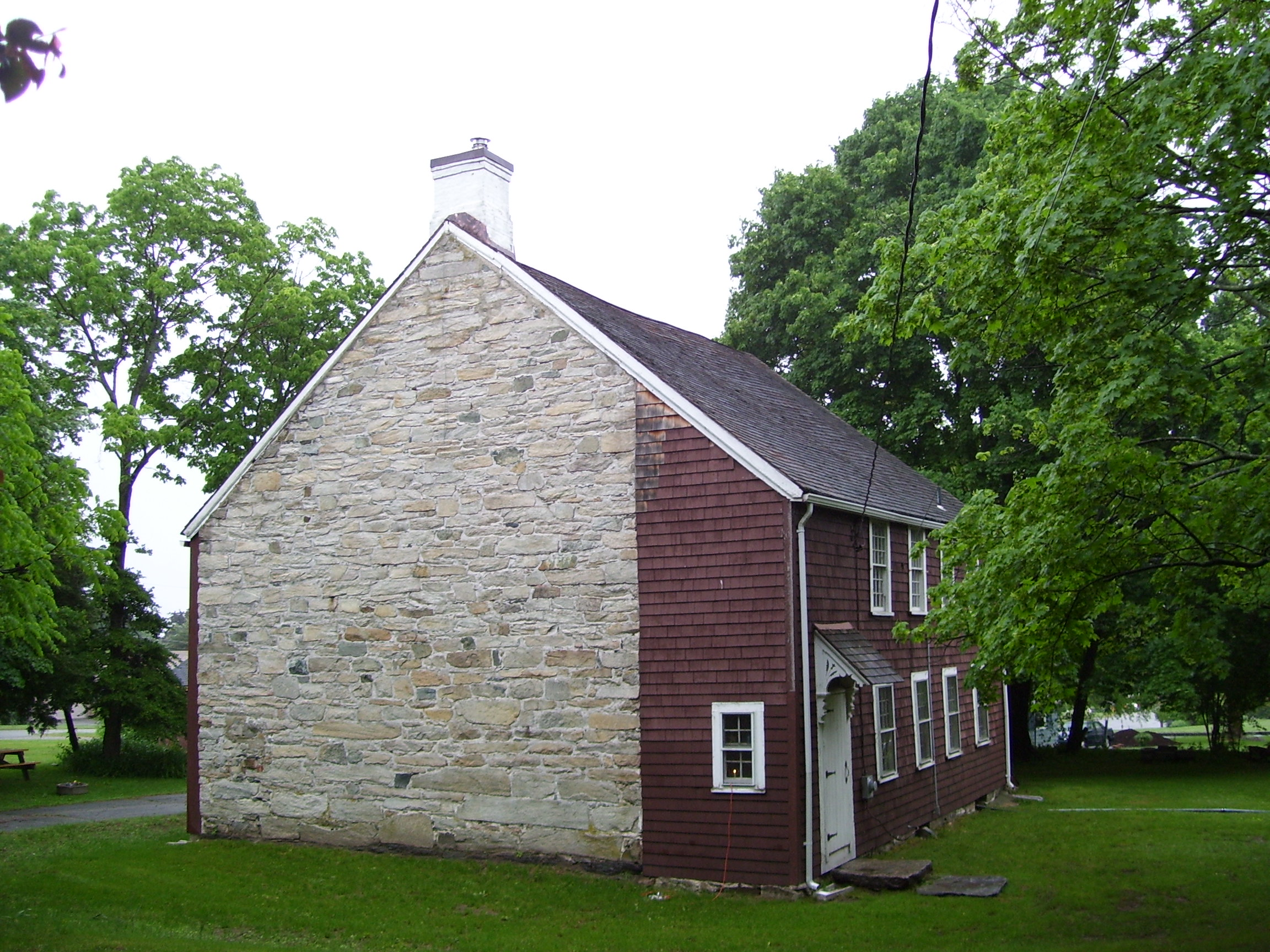
Valentine Whitman House in 2008

The Valentine Whitman House is an historic stone ender house on Great Road in Lincoln, Rhode Island. The house is one of the oldest surviving buildings in the state.

The large farmhouse was built around 1694. The house features a large stone chimney at one end. In 1730 the first town meeting of Smithfield (which then included modern day Lincoln) was held in the house.

== Images ==
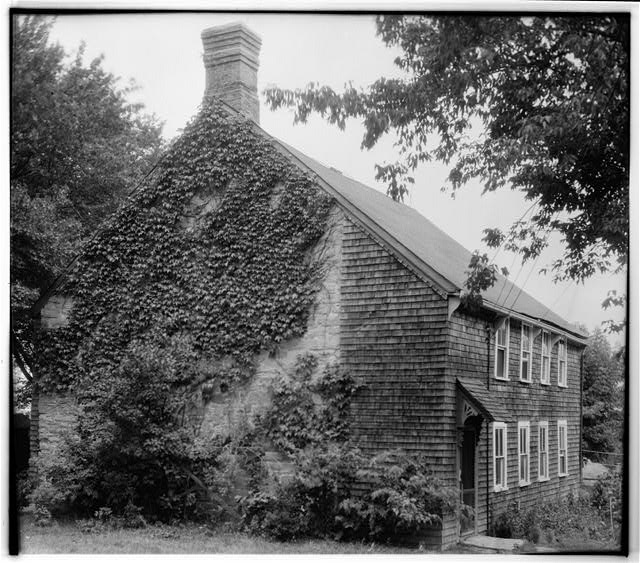
Valentine Whitman House, ca. 1937
