= List of the oldest buildings in Rhode Island =

This article attempts to list the oldest buildings in the state of Rhode Island in the United States of America, including the oldest houses in Rhode Island and any other surviving structures. Some dates are approximate and based on architectural studies and historical records, other dates are based on dendrochronology All entries should include citation with reference to: architectural features; a report by an architectural historian; or dendrochronology

Very few Rhode Island buildings have been tested yet using dendrochronology (less than a dozen houses as of 2019), and most buildings outside of Aquidneck Island were burned in King Philip's War in the 1670s. The oldest building in Rhode Island tested using dendrochronology was the Clemence-Irons House (1691) in Johnston, although the Lucas–Johnston House in Newport holds some timbers which were felled prior to 1650, but likely reused from an earlier building.

== List ==
Building	Image	Location		First Built	Notes
Governor Peleg Sanford House		Newport	41.49077°N 71.31315°W	c. 1640s–1701	One of the oldest buildings in Newport; Constructed before the death of Gov. Sanford in 1701; Not yet tested using dendrochronology
White Horse Tavern		Newport	41.491667°N 71.314167°W	1652; 1673	Oldest tavern in America, originally built in 1652 as a residence and expanded into a tavern in 1673, likely including parts of the original structure; Not yet tested using dendrochronology
Stephen Northup House		North Kingstown	41.551389°N 71.447778°W	c. 1660–1661 (possibly rebuilt in 1670s)	Possibly burned during King Philip's War in the 1670s and rebuilt, later modifications 1712, 1850, 2004; Not yet tested using dendrochronology
Newport Tower		Newport	41.4858°N 71.3099°W	c. 1670	Purported to be a Viking structure; likely the remains of a colonial windmill; No roof or floors since the mid-18th century; Radiocarbon dating tests of the tower's mortar suggest a probable date of production of the mortar between 1635 and 1698.
Philip Sherman House		Portsmouth	41.58340°N 71.24577°W	c. 1670	House of Philip Sherman, one of the founders of Portsmouth, RI; Not yet tested using dendrochronology
Thomas Fenner House		Cranston	41.790833°N 71.488611°W	1677	Early stone ender; Not yet tested using dendrochronology
Edward Searle House		Cranston	41.748333°N 71.482222°W	1670–1720	Early stone ender; Not yet tested using dendrochronology
Capt. John Mawdsley House		Newport	41.484167°N 71.312222°W	c. 1677–1680	Significantly modified in the 18th-century; Not yet tested using dendrochronology; Listed on the National Register of Historic Places
Smith's Castle		Wickford	41.583333°N 71.454444°W	1678	Site of Roger Williams' trading post; Today a National Historic Landmark and house museum; Not yet tested using dendrochronology
Clement Weaver House		East Greenwich	41.658889°N 71.476944°W	1679	Early stone ender; Not yet tested using dendrochronology; Listed on the National Register of Historic Places
John Bliss House		Newport	41.49974°N 71.30204°W	c. 1680	Early stone ender
Nathaniel Bosworth House		Bristol	41.678509°N 71.278333°W	c. 1683	Oldest house in Bristol
Forge Farm		Warwick	41.638611°N 71.451667°W	1684	Oldest portion of the structure dates to 1684; Not yet tested using dendrochronology
Daggett House		Pawtucket	41.888667°N 71.344056°W	1685	Oldest house in Pawtucket; Not yet tested using dendrochronology
Gorton-Greene House		Warwick	41.665179°N 71.45967°W	1685	Not yet tested using dendrochronology
Palmer-Northrup House		North Kingstown	41.576944°N 71.461111°W	c. 1685	Early stone ender; Not yet tested using dendrochronology
Hopelands		Warwick	41.65798°N 71.42135°W	c. 1686	Western ell of building dates to 1686, though not yet tested using dendrochronology; Now part of Rocky Hill School
Peleg Arnold Tavern		North Smithfield	41.98916°N 71.53388°W	c. 1690	Home of Peleg Arnold; Not yet tested using dendrochronology
Wilbor House		Little Compton	41.495278°N 71.186389°W	1690	Oldest house in Little Compton; Not yet tested using dendrochronology
Clemence–Irons House		Johnston	41.839167°N 71.484444°W	1691	Primitive stone ender; Oldest house in Rhode Island to be dated using dendrochronology (2005)
Samuel Clarke House		Kenyon	41.46065°N 71.624775°W	1691	Retains original exterior wide oak weatherboards – on the north side, early 18th-century window sash and frames, a granite central chimney with four fireplaces and original period interior architectural detail; Not yet tested using dendrochronology
Eleazer Arnold House		Lincoln	41.902778°N 71.420556°W	c. 1693	National Historic Landmark; Dated using dendrochronology in 2005
Valentine Whitman House		Lincoln	41.931843°N 71.456664°W	1694	Early stone ender; Not yet tested using dendrochronology
Smith-Appleby House		Smithfield	41.901944°N 71.518333°W	1696	House Museum; Not yet tested using dendrochronology
Wanton-Lyman-Hazard House		Newport	41.49084°N 71.31261°W	1697	One of the oldest houses in Newport; Currently a museum; Dated using dendrochronology in 2005.
Joseph Reynolds House		Bristol	41.683451°N 71.278543°W	c. 1698–1700	National Historic Landmark; Not yet tested using dendrochronology
Great Friends Meeting House		Newport	41.492008°N 71.31305°W	1699	Quaker Meeting House; Oldest surviving church building in Rhode Island; Dated in 2005 to 1699 using dendrochronology
Portsmouth Friends Meetinghouse		Portsmouth	41.591111°N 71.254444°W	1699–1700	Quaker Meeting House and original site of Moses Brown School; Likely the oldest church building in RI used continuously as a church.
Samuel E. Perry House		South Kingstown	41.38298°N 71.57067°W	1696–1716. Foundation purportedly dates from 1661.	Private home located on Matunuck Schoolhouse Rd
Nathaniel Daggett House		East Providence	41.837778°N 71.362778°W	c. 1700	Likely the oldest house in East Providence
Perry-Carpenter Grist Mill		South Kingstown	41.837778°N 71.362778°W	1703	Located in Matunuck
Six Principle Baptist Church		North Kingstown	41.592778°N 71.491389°W	1703	Oldest Baptist church building in RI; Possibly the oldest Baptist church building in the U.S.
Saylesville Meetinghouse		Lincoln	41.900556°N 71.418333°W	1704	Possibly the oldest church building in Providence County, RI
Old Narragansett Church		Wickford	41.5725°N 71.449722°W	1707	Oldest surviving colonial Episcopal church in the Northern United States
Governor Stephen Hopkins House		Providence	41.821667°N 71.403333°W	1708, 1742	Oldest extant home in Providence
Dr. Charles Cotton House		Newport	41.488333°N 71.314722°W	c. 1720	Dr. Charles Cotton, a great-grandson of Josiah Cotton and surgeon aboard the USS Constitution, owned the house in the early 19th century
Peter Greene House		Warwick	41.715278°N 71.376111°W	c. 1720–1750	
Henry Palmer House		South Kingstown		1721	Private home in East Matunuck; Located on Old Succotash Rd
Carr-LeValley House		West Warwick	41.71673°N 71.53283°W	1722	Possibly the oldest building in West Warwick, RI
Phillip Walker House		East Providence	41.830278°N 71.363889°W	1724	Research site used by Roger Williams University; Dated to 1724 using tree ring dendrochronology
Trinity Episcopal Church		Newport	41.4875°N 71.313889°W	1726	Oldest Parish in the Episcopal Diocese of Rhode Island; National Historic Landmark
Antram-Gray House		Providence	41.83132°N 71.41071°W	1736	Now the visitors' center at Roger Williams National Memorial
Captain John Warren House	Captain John Warren House (c. 1737)	Newport	41.49319°N 71.32108°W	1737	French Navy Artillery Headquarters 1780–1781
Gilbert Stuart Birthplace		Saunderstown	41.52017°N 71.44469°W	1750	Birthplace of Gilbert Stuart, one of 18th-century America's most noted portrait artists; National Historic Landmark
Willow Dell (Weeden Farm House)		South Kingstown	41.39660°N 71.55115°W	1753	Located in Matunuck
Rocky Meadows Farm House		South Kingstown		1754	Rumored to have been a tavern; Private home located on Old Post Road (Route 1); The farm land is now protected by the South Kingstown Land Trust.
Henry Marchant House		South Kingstown	41.48039°N 71.59650°W	pre 1760	Located off of South County Trail (Route 2); Home of politician Henry Marchant
Touro Synagogue	Touro Synagogue, Newport, Rhode Island	Newport	41.489444°N 71.311944°W	1759–1763	Oldest surviving synagogue building in the United States
University Hall		Providence	41.826111°N 71.403889°W	1770	National Historic Landmark; Oldest purpose-built academic building in Rhode Island
Jonathan Treadwell House		Providence	41.82935°N 71.40910°W	1783	Private residence on North Court Street; Possible inspiration for the home of Dr. Elihu Whipple in "The Shunned House" by H. P. Lovecraft
Prudence Island Light		Portsmouth (Prudence Island)	41.605861°N 71.303528°W	1824	Oldest lighthouse tower in Rhode Island; Moved from original location on Goat Island in Newport to Prudence Island at a later date
Poplar Point Light		North Kingstown	41.570833°N 71.439722°W	1832	Oldest wooden lighthouse tower still standing in the United States

== Destroyed early Rhode Island buildings ==
Building	Image	Location	First Built	Destroyed	Notes
Henry Bull House		Newport	c. 1639	1912	Destroyed by fire on December 29, 1912; Allegedly the oldest house in Rhode Island until its destruction
William Coddington House		Newport	1640–1641	1835	Razed 1835
Roger Mowry Tavern		Providence	c. 1653	1900	Restored and documented by Norman Isham in the late 19th century; Oldest house in Providence until its demolition in 1900
Arthur Fenner House		Cranston	c. 1655	1886	Arthur Fenner House (c. 1655) in Cranston, demolished 1886
John Smith House		Warwick	Before 1663	1779	Built by Colonial president John Smith; Razed in 1779
Epenetus Olney House		North Providence	c. 17th century	by 1900	Stone ender was one of oldest houses in North Providence until its demolition in 1900

== See also ==
- Henry Bull House, c. 1639 possibly oldest house in RI until demolished in 1912)
- Oldest buildings in America
- Roger Mowry Tavern, c. 1653 possibly oldest house in RI until demolished in 1900)
- Stone-ender
- Timeline of architectural styles
