= Governor Sanford =

Governor Sanford may refer to:

- John Sanford (1605-1653) governor of Newport and Portsmouth
- Mark Sanford (born 1960) governor of South Carolina
- Peleg Sanford (1639–1701), Governor of the Colony of Rhode Island and Providence Plantations from 1680 to 1683
- Terry Sanford (1917-1998) governor and later senator of North Carolina
