= Onorato =

Onorato may refer to:

== Given name ==
- Onorato Caetani (1842–1917), Italian politician from the noble Caetani-family
- Onorato Caetani (1742–1797), Italian scholar
- Onorato Candiota (...- after 1808), Italian philosopher
- Onorato Carlandi (1848–1939), Italian painter
- Onorato Damen (1893–1979), Italian communist
- Onorato I Caetani (c. 1336–1400), Italian nobleman
- Onorato Nicoletti (1872–1929), Italian mathematician
- Onorato Onorati, Italian Roman Catholic bishop

== Surname ==
- Dan Onorato (born 1961), American Democratic politician
- George Onorato (1928–2015), American politician
- Giovanni Onorato (1910–1960), Italian film actor
- Glauco Onorato (1936–2009), Italian actor and voice actor
- Marco Onorato (1953–2012), Italian cinematographer
- Ronald J. Onorato, American architectural historian and professor of Art History and Chair
- Vincenzo Onorato (born 1957), Italian sailor
