= Stephen Northup =

- Born: roughly 1630
- Died: after September 1687; Kingstowne, Rhode Island
- Education: Signed his name
- Occupations: Sergeant, mill operator (?)
- Spouse: Elizabeth Hearnden
- Children: Stephen, Benjamin, Henry, Mary, Joseph, David

Stephen Northup^{[a]} (roughly 1630 – after 1687) was an early settler of the Colony of Rhode Island and Providence Plantations, and built what may be the oldest house still standing in Rhode Island. Northup was a fairly early settler of Providence in the Rhode Island colony, but accounts claiming that he settled the area with Roger Williams are inaccurate, since Northup was an infant or child when Williams first came to Providence in the spring of 1636. Northup lived in Providence from 1655 to 1666, after which he moved to the Narragansett country (what is now North Kingstown, Rhode Island), which land was claimed by both the Rhode Island and Connecticut colonies. He may have owned or operated a grist mill, and is credited with building a house that still stands and is used as a private residence. Northup was married, had six known children, and lived until at least 1687, when he was taxed. He was the great grandfather of Capt. Henry Northup who left Rhode Island to settle in Hoosick, New York, and took his slave Mintus who was manumitted in 1797. Mintus assumed the surname Northup, and had a free-born son, Solomon Northup, the subject of the Academy Award-winning film 12 Years a Slave.

== Providence ==
The origins of Stephen Northup are unknown. Published sources are silent as to his provenance, but online sources have offered two possibilities. One is that he was born in 1633 as the son of Hampton Northup of Flintshire, Wales. The other is that he was born in 1625, the son of Henry Northup of Whaddon, Cambridgeshire, England.

Though there is no marriage record, and the name of his wife does not appear in any public record, online sources indicate that Northup married about 1654 Elizabeth Harrington, the daughter of Benjamin Harrington, and genealogist Virginia Chappell also says that his wife was a daughter of Benjamin Harrington. Austin's Genealogical Dictionary of Rhode Island does not show a Benjamin Harrington, but does show a Benjamin Hearnden with wife Elizabeth and nine children, but no daughter Elizabeth. As it turns out, these two Benjamins are the same person, and though the name of the family in the early records favors "Hearnden", most descendants use the name "Harrington" or "Herrington" with a few other intermediate spelling variants such as "Herrendine" or "Herrendeen".

Despite no record showing Northup's wife to be a Hearnden/Harrington, there is a connection between the two families that is significant. In southern North Kingstown Rhode Island is a cemetery that is called the Ancient Northup Burial Ground (Rhode Island Historic Cemetery North Kingstown #51), and though most of the graves are only marked with field stones, there are some Northups that have inscribed markers, and there is also a crude handwritten inscription on a marker that reads "Ebenezer Hearrandain, desesed June 17, 1713. He worse borne June 21, 1681." The Genealogical Dictionary of Rhode Island shows this Ebenezer to be a grandson of Benjamin Hearnden. So, here is a connection between the two families that lends credence to the supposition that Northup's wife may have been a Hearnden/Harrington. To make the relationship between the two families even more plausible, Staples, in 1843, published a list of 28 early Providence settlers who each received 25 acres of land, beginning in 1646. On this list of names is Stephen Northup, as well as Benjamin "Herendeen", the latter with his name signed by a mark, this very likely being a relative of Northup's wife.

There has been misinterpretation as to when Stephen Northup arrived in Providence. The list in Staples' book giving the names of some early Providence settlers is dated "The 19th of 11 mo. 1645," which means 19 January 1646, since in the Julian calendar in use, March was the first month, and 11 January. The list consists of 28 individuals "whose names are hereafter subscribed, having obtained a free grant of Twenty-five acres of land, apiece..." However, Staples then notes that "The appearance of the signatures to the original document indicates they were not made at the same time." Staples states that adjustments, written in the margin, were made to the original agreement "after the establishment of the Commonwealth of England," which took place in 1649 and lasted until 1660. Therefore, the placement of Northup's name on the document may have taken place at a date later than 1646. The next record indicates that it was later, in fact many years later. With the exception of the preceding document, the first time Northup's name appears in a public record is on 2 October 1655 when "the town meetinge of Providence, in the Colony of Rhode Island, granted to Stephen Northup, twenty-five acres of land". This 1655 date should be considered his earliest arrival in Providence.

On 27 August 1656, at another town meeting, "it was ordered that Stephen Northup have a home-lot laid out to him over against Christopher Smith's lot; also, that he have commonage equal to any other townsman; and that he be allowed to vote with the other inhabitants of the town." He built his house at the north end of the town, between the main street and the Moshassuck River. Austin states that he was made a freeman in Providence in 1658, but this may just mean that his name appears on a list of freemen, because he had already been given the privilege of voting two years earlier. On 27 July 1659 Northup sold 60 acres of land at Rocky Hill to William Carpenter, and on 4 June 1660 he was selected as the Town Sergeant for Providence. During his service as sergeant John Clawson, a Dutchman and protege of Roger Williams, was murdered by an Indian not far from Northup's house. Northup then went about "warning the town about the prisoner," and was paid three shillings for his efforts. Northup spent four days taking the prisoner to Newport and attending the trial.

In 1662 Northup sold all of his rights to land between the Pawtucket and Pawtuxet Rivers to William Hawkins, and in 1665 he obtained a lot in a division of lands in Providence. The last record for him in Providence occurred when on 28 March 1666 he witnessed a deed there, but two months later his name does not appear on a list of those in Providence taking an oath of allegiance to the King, thus he had likely moved to Kingstowne by then.

== Kingstowne ==
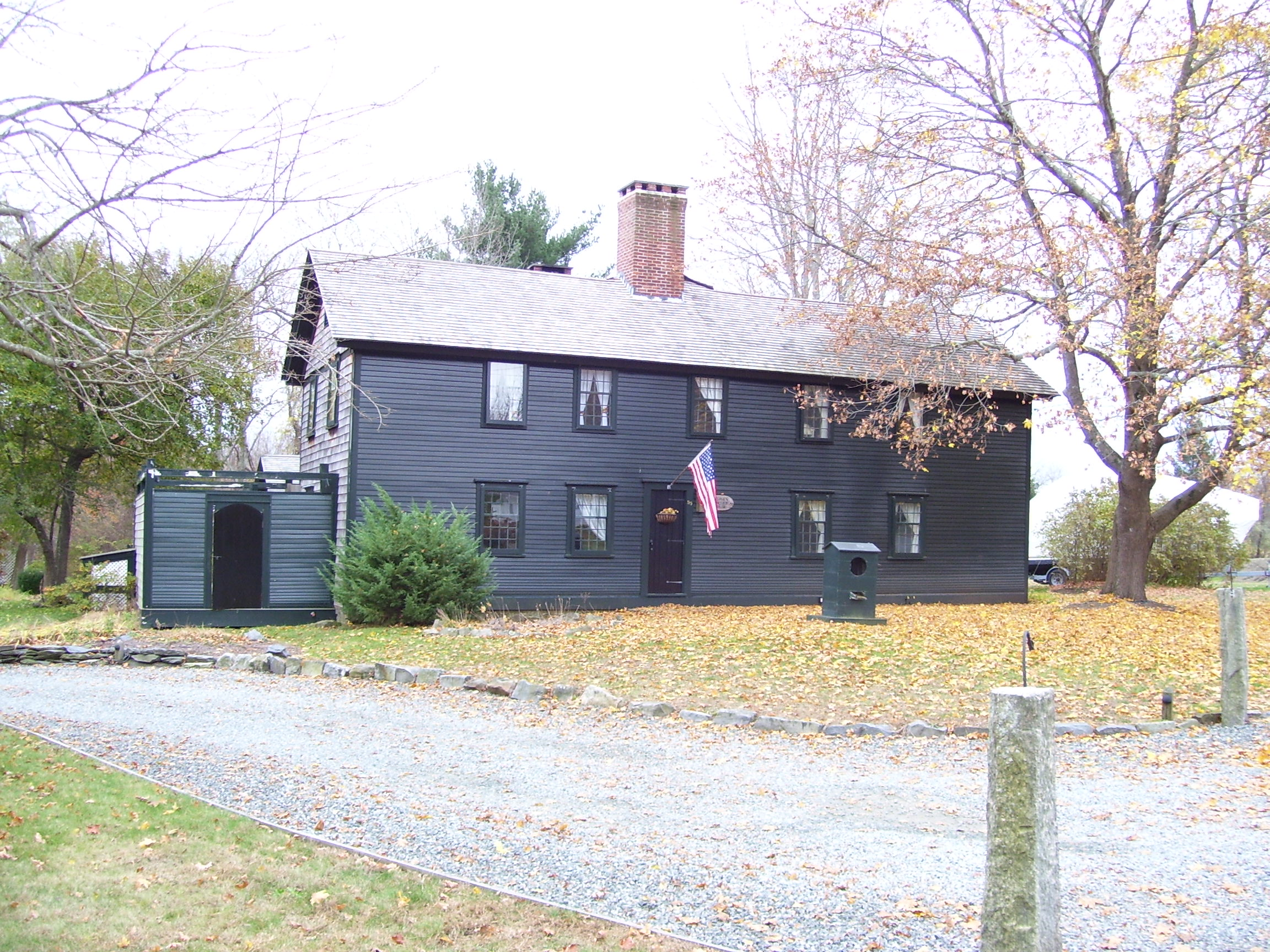
The house begun by Stephen Northup in the 17th century still stands in North Kingstown, Rhode Island.

After leaving Providence, Northup moved to the Narragansett country, which was organized as Kingstowne in 1674, and later split into North Kingstown and South Kingstown in 1722, the former being where Northup lived. On 19 May 1671 he took the oath of allegiance here, and in August 1672 he was called to appear before the Connecticut court. The Narraganset country was in dispute between the Connecticut and Rhode Island colonies, and both jurisdictions claimed these lands. Northup's reply to the Connecticut court was, "I denie to obey any warrant from ye authority of Conecticot; if ye government of Roade Island send any I will obey them but not this warrant nor any from Conecticot Colony." Sometime in the 1660s or 1670s Northup had purchased some of the Pettaquamscutt lands from Samuel Wilbur and other Pettaquamscutt purchasers. Title to the land was in dispute with the Humphrey Atherton Company, but on 5 December 1679 Northup and others were entitled to keep their lands. Northup had 120 acres of land on the west side of Pettaquamscot Pond, not far from the Gilbert Stuart Birthplace. He is last found in the public record in September 1687 when he was taxed 5s 1/2 d.

There are so few extant records concerning Stephen Northup in Kingstowne, that much of the portrayal of his life there is anecdotal. For instance, his occupation does not appear in any existing records, but a family researcher in the 1930s, Lester Burgess, wrote this: "The Northups owned or operated the grist mill at the Gilbert Stuart place, the foundations of which are now (1939) barely visible. I believe the first dam there was built by old Stephen Northup." The story of the Stephen Northup House is just as enigmatic. While an establishment date of 1660 appears in some sources, this date is problematical for two reasons, the first being that in 1675 and 1676 there was a devastating war in the area, and most historians agree that all houses south of Providence were destroyed during the war, with the noted exception of John Smith's stone-built "castle" in Warwick. The second reason is that Northup's residence in Providence continued at least through 1666, and there is no record of him in Kingstowne before 1671. There doesn't appear to be any documentary evidence supporting the 1660 construction of the house. The National Park Service, in their report on historic North Kingstown properties, only gives a general timeframe for the house's construction: "The Stephen Northup House at 99 Featherbed Lane is another house in which the seventeenth-century core has been preserved by an eighteenth-century addition." North Kingstown historian, Tim Cranston, gives the date of the house as "1680-1690s" with additions made in the 18th and 19th centuries.

== Family ==
Genealogical compiler John O. Austin only attributes four children to Northup and his wife, but family historian Virginia Chappell adds two more. Of the six children that have been credited to the couple, the oldest was likely Stephen (1660-1733), who married Mary Thomas of Jamestown and had eight children.Their offspring included:

- Nicholas Northup (20 January 1690–4 February 1764), youngest child, married 23 June 1732 to Freelove Eldredge; their great grandson John Syler Northup founded Northup, Ohio.

The next son, Benjamin (1662-1750), married in 1681 Susannah Almy. He was originally buried in a small family plot on land that belonged to Wilbur Hazard, but was, before 1880, moved to Elm Grove Cemetery. However, the Elm Grove Cemetery book shows no record of his being buried there, so his marker may be defunct or illegible, or else he may not have had a marker moved to the new burial location.

The next son, Henry (1663-1740) married Mary Kingsley and had four known children. The only daughter, Mary, married John Mowry and died in 1724.

The next son, Joseph (died before 1726) was married and had several children, but the wife given him by Austin actually belongs to a nephew of Joseph. Of his known children:

- Ann Northup (~1691 – ~1772), married 28 February 1714 to Yelverton Gifford; their daughter Hannah Gifford (~15 June 1715 – 3 February 1798) was a second great grandmother of Stephen Arnold Douglas, who sparred with Abraham Lincoln in a series of famous debates in 1858, prior to a senate race, and later lost to him in the 1860 presidential election.

David, the presumed youngest son, (died in 1725) married Susanna Congdon, the daughter of Benjamin Congdon and Elizabeth Albro, and the granddaughter of Major John Albro who was an early magistrate of the colony. David and Susanna had four known children.

== See also ==
- Stephen Northup House
- Colony of Rhode Island and Providence Plantations
- History of Rhode Island
- Oldest buildings in Rhode Island
- Stephen A. Douglas ancestry Hannah Gifford in the chart was the daughter of Ann Northup, a granddaughter of Stephen Northup
