= Hopelands =

- U.S. National Register of Historic Places
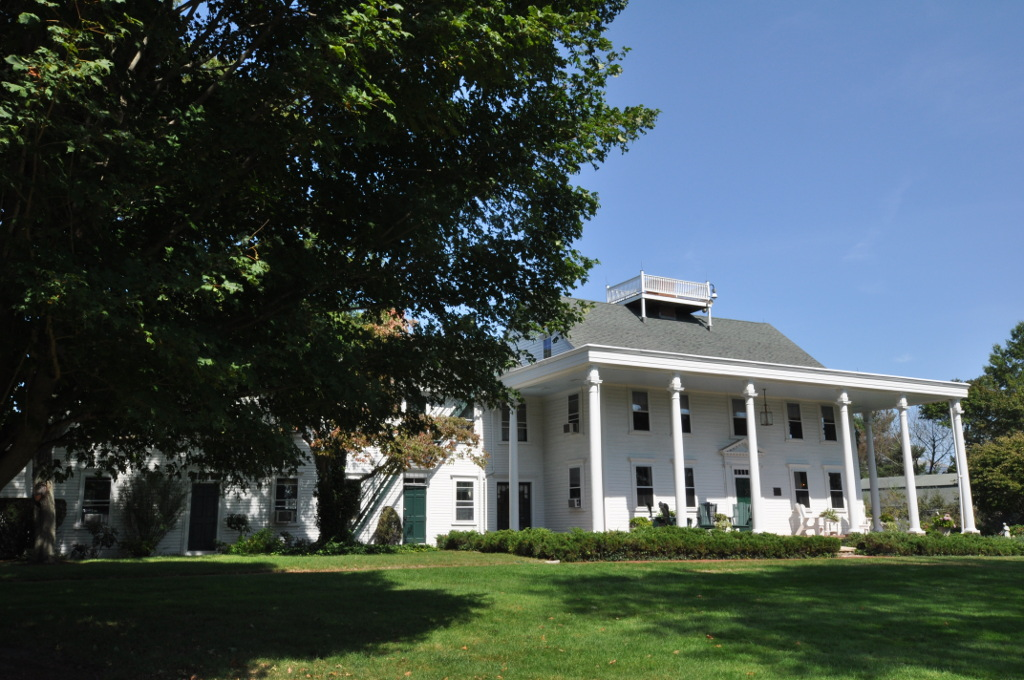

- Location within Rhode Island Location within the United States
- Location: Warwick, Rhode Island
- Coordinates: 41°39′27″N 71°25′2″W
- Area: 75 acres (30 ha)
- Built: 1686
- Architectural style: Greek Revival, Colonial
- MPS: Warwick MRA
- NRHP reference No.: 83000173
- Added to NRHP: August 18, 1983

Hopelands is a historic country estate on Wampanoag Road in Warwick, Rhode Island. It is now the campus of the Rocky Hill School, a private college preparatory school. The historic centerpiece of the estate is a Colonial Revival mansion house, whose western ell is a wood-frame structure built in 1686. This house and its associated 75-acre (30 ha) property became the center of one of Warwick's first country estates, when in 1793 a Federal-style house was built by Thomas P. Ives and Hope (Brown) Ives, to which the old building was attached. This was given extensive Colonial Revival treatment in 1885 by Moses Goddard. The estate was acquired by the Rocky Hill School in 1948.

The estate was listed on the National Register of Historic Places in 1983.

== See also ==
- National Register of Historic Places listings in Kent County, Rhode Island
- List of the oldest buildings in Rhode Island
