= Samuel Clarke Farm =

Historic farm in Rhode Island, US

- U.S. National Register of Historic Places
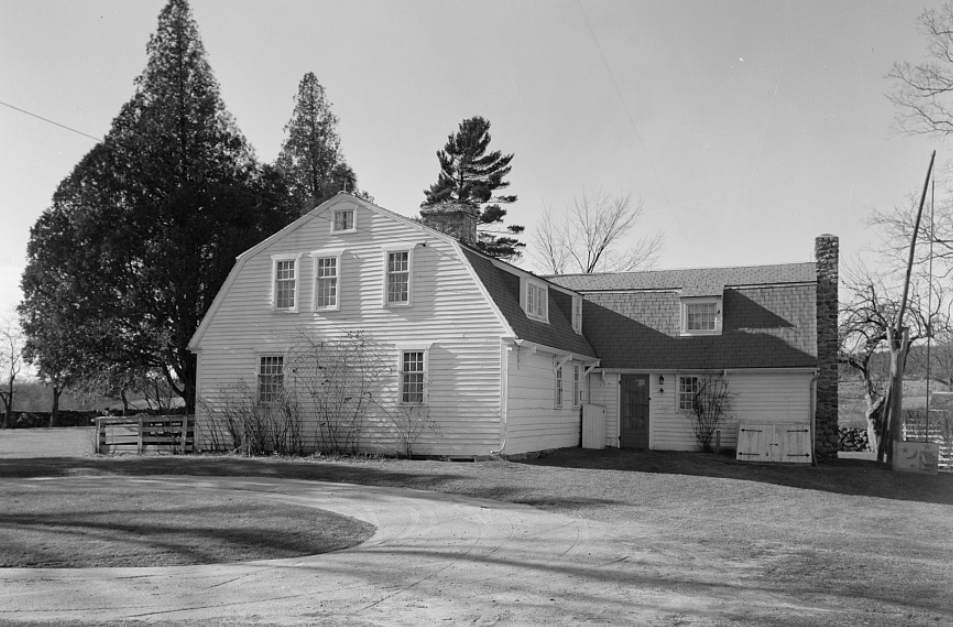

- Location within Rhode Island Location within the United States
- Location: Kenyon, Rhode Island
- Coordinates: 41.460650°N 71.624775°W
- NRHP reference No.: 100003413
- Added to NRHP: February 4, 2019

Drawing 32 - Windows of Eighteenth-Century Rhode Island Buildings - Samuel Clarke House

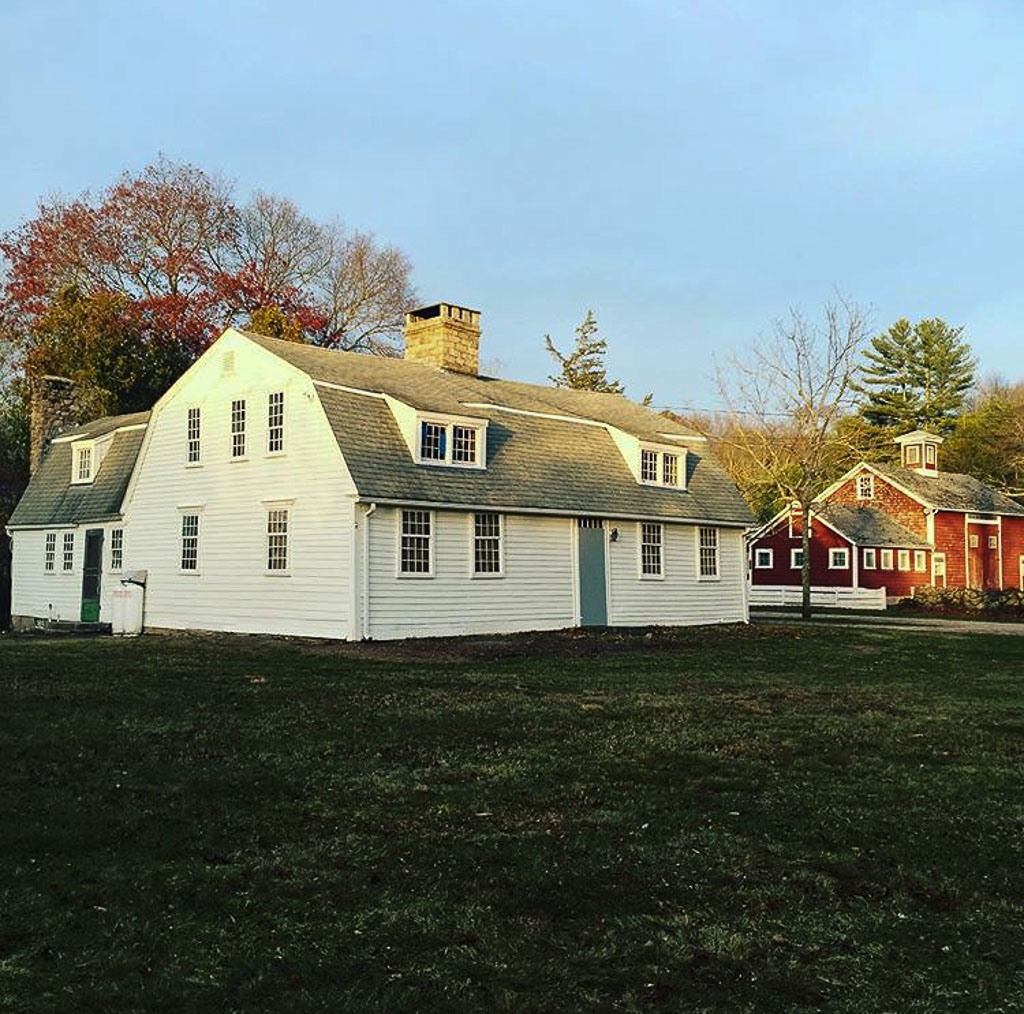
Samuel Clarke Farmhouse - Today

The Samuel Clarke House is a residential structure dating to c. 1691, one of the earliest surviving houses in the U.S. state of Rhode Island It is the central building of the "Samuel Clarke Farm", now a 40-acre parcel in Kenyon, Rhode Island, within the town of Richmond. The farm is bordered to the west by the Beaver River. This property was originally part of a larger parcel, one mile wide and five miles long, that was sold in 1662 by the Niantic Sachem Wanumachon in a historic land transaction known as the Stanton Purchase.

Joseph Clarke (1642—1727) purchased approximately 200 acres of the Stanton Purchase land the following year. By 1691 Joseph Clarke had transferred a parcel to his son, Samuel (1672–1769). Samuel Clarke built the original portion of the farmhouse on this land in about 1691. A large carved granite block in the keeping room fireplace, just below the original beehive bake oven, memorializes this date. The original farmhouse was modified and expanded in the 18th century. The gambrel-roofed house follows a typical five-room plan, often constructed in 18th century Rhode Island. Remarkably, the house retains its original exterior wide oak weatherboards on the north side, early 18th-century window sash and frames, a massive granite central chimney with four fireplaces and nearly all of its original period interior architectural detail. The kitchen to the north was added in the late 19th century.

Extant farm buildings include a red-painted 19th-century barn, a corn crib on its original granite piers, carriage and wood sheds, an outhouse, a stone blacksmith's shop and forge, a stone root cellar, and a one-room schoolhouse built in 1812. There is also a well-preserved Clarke family cemetery on the property.

The farm remained in the Clarke family until 1950. The last Clarke family owner was Elizabeth Stanton Knowles Marvel, (Mrs. Frederick W. Marvel - 1874-1950). At the time of her death the farm encompassed over 500 acres.

The house and farm buildings have been restored and the open land re-cultivated.

On February 4, 2019 the Samuel Clarke Farm was individually listed on the National Register of Historic Places. SG100003413

Place:

- Rhode Island—Washington County—Kenyon

Samuel Clarke House, Kenyon, RI Historic American Buildings Survey - Library of Congress

Collections:

- Historic American Buildings Survey/Historic American Engineering Record/Historic American Landscapes Survey
- Part of: Historic American Buildings Survey (Library of Congress)

== Sources ==
1. Early Homes of Rhode Island, Antoinette Downing, Garrett and Massie, Richmond, Virginia 1937. (https://catalog.hathitrust.org/Record/000643711)
2. Historic and Architectural Resources of Richmond, Rhode Island Historic Preservation Commission, 1977. (http://www.preservation.ri.gov/pdfs_zips_downloads/survey_pdfs/richmond.pdf)
3. Jordy, William H., Buildings of Rhode Island (Ronald J. Onorato and William McKenzie Woodward, contributing editors), Oxford University Press, New York 2004, ISBN 0-19-506147-0
4. The Stanton Purchase, Susan Stanton Brayton, RI Historical Society, Vol. XXVIII, October 1935, No.4, pg. 101+ (http://www.rihs.org/library/collections/)
5. The Lands of Rhode Island as they were known to Caunounicus and Miantunnomu, when Roger Williams came in 1636. Sidney Smith Rider, Providence, RI, 1904. (https://archive.org/details/landsrhodeislan01ridegoog)
6. RI HABS Survey - #296, Samuel Clarke House, Kenyon, Washington County, RI. Arthur W. LeBeouf, 1937. (https://www.loc.gov/pictures/collection/hh/index/places/r/) (http://www.preservation.ri.gov/pdfs_zips_downloads/survey_pdfs/south_kingstown.pdf) ().
7. Providence Sunday Journal, June, 1957, "A Rural Legacy from the Past". (http://www.provlib.org/rhode-island-collection)
8. Library of Congress Print and Photograph Online Catalog Record: (https://www.loc.gov/pictures/item/ri0292/)
