= Wilbor House =

Historic house in Rhode Island, United States

- U.S. National Register of Historic Places
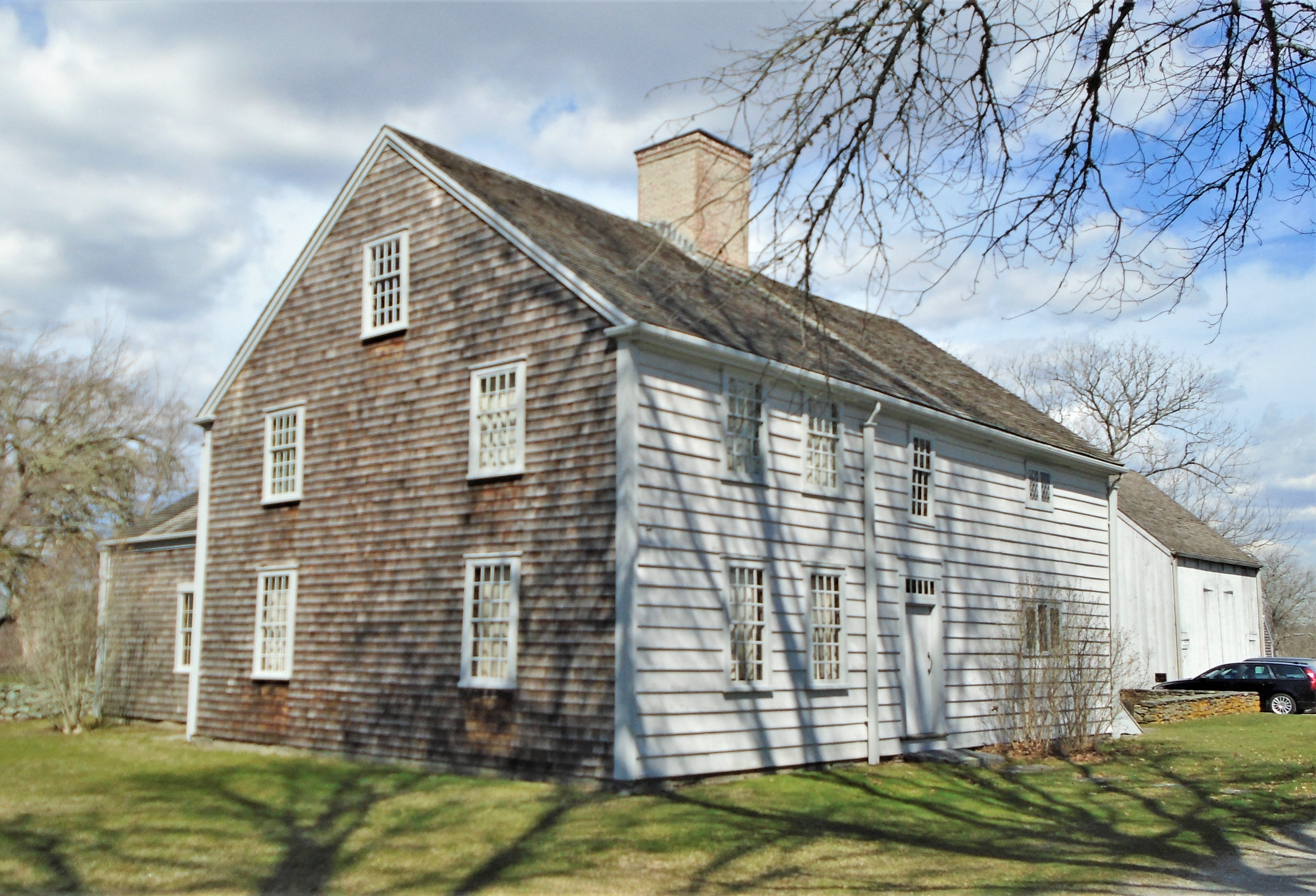
- (2021)

- Location within Rhode Island Location within the United States
- Location: 548 W. Main Rd., Little Compton, Rhode Island
- Coordinates: 41°29′43″N 71°11′11″W
- Area: 1.4 acres (0.57 ha)
- Built: 1690
- Architectural style: Georgian, Postmedieval English
- NRHP reference No.: 07000125
- Added to NRHP: March 06, 2007

The Wilbor House is a historic house museum at 548 West Main Road in Little Compton, Rhode Island, and currently serves as the headquarters of the Little Compton Historical Society. The property includes eight buildings of historical significance, six of which were part of the Wilbor farmstead, a complex that was used for farming between 1690, when the east end of the house was built, and 1955, when the property was acquired by the historical society. The house is a 2½-story wood-frame structure, whose oldest portion was a stone ender built by Samuel Wilbor (1664–1740), and whose western half was added c.1740, giving it a Georgian appearance. Two ells were added c.1860, and additional expansions were made in 1967. The five farm outbuildings include an 18th-century outhouse, a c.1800 barn, and corn crib and carriage house, both of which were built c.1850. Two additional non-contributing structures are on the property, the frame of a c.1750 barn covered in modern materials, and a modern replica of an 18th-century schoolhouse.

The house was listed on the National Register of Historic Places in 2007.

== See also ==
- Friends Meeting House and Cemetery
- List of the oldest buildings in Rhode Island
- National Register of Historic Places listings in Newport County, Rhode Island
