= Peleg Sanford =

Rhode Island colonial governor

10th Governor of the Colony of Rhode Island and Providence Plantations
- In office 1680–1683
- Preceded by: John Cranston
- Succeeded by: William Coddington Jr.

Personal details
- Born: 10 May 1639 Newport, Rhode Island
- Died: 1701 (aged 61–62)
- Spouse(s): Mary Brenton; Mary Coddington
- Occupation: Captain, Assistant, Deputy, Governor

Peleg Sanford (10 May 1639 – 1701) was an early governor of the Colony of Rhode Island and Providence Plantations, serving three consecutive terms from 1680 to 1683.

== Biography ==
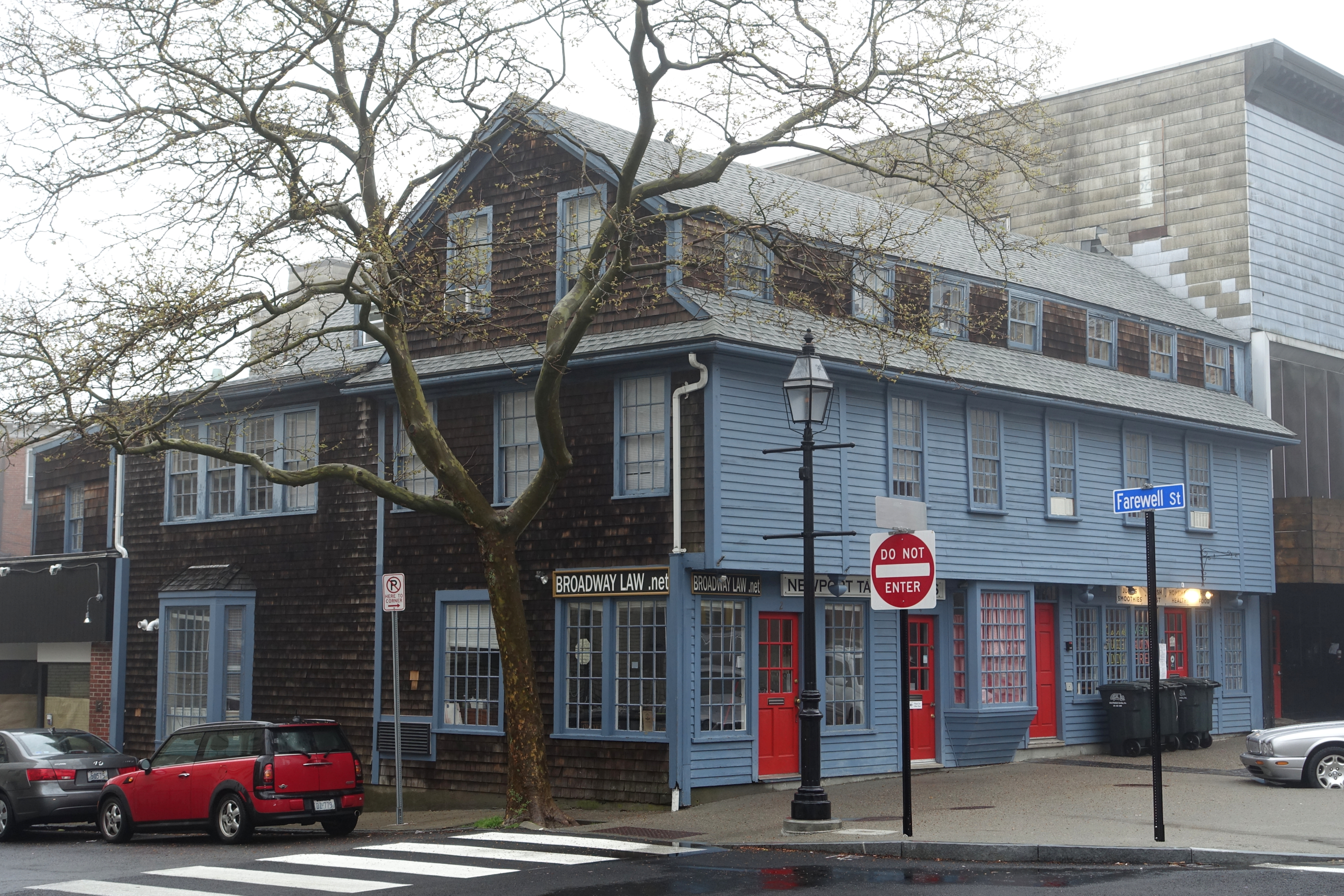
Governor Peleg Sanford House in Newport, one of the oldest houses in Rhode Island

=== Family ===
Sanford was the son of John Sanford by his second wife, Bridget Hutchinson. His father had been the cannoneer at the fort in Boston in the Massachusetts Bay Colony, but was forced to leave Boston in 1637 when Peleg's grandmother, the famed Anne Hutchinson, was evicted for her religious views, having, in the words of John Winthrop, "seduced and led into dangerous errors many of the people...in New England." With Anne Hutchinson and her followers, the Sanfords established themselves in Portsmouth in the Rhode Island colony, and Peleg's father, John, was briefly the governor of the two towns of Newport and Portsmouth, which were separated from Providence and Warwick for a short time.

=== Militia service ===
Sanford grew up in Newport, and as a young man was appointed as the captain of the troop of horse there. Following the events of King Philip's War, he and Captain Goulding informed Captain Church of the hiding location of the Indian warrior King Phillip, and the following day the Indian was found and killed. In 1677 he and Richard Bailey were chosen as agents to go to England to deal with incursions made by the neighboring colony of Connecticut. In 1679, he was promoted to major in command of the Rhode Island Militia, and in 1687 he was promoted to the rank of lieutenant colonel.

=== Political career ===
In 1667, at the age of 28, Sanford began his political life and became an assistant, serving for three years, then was deputy for seven years, after which he once again served as assistant for another two years, ending in 1679. He served as the major in command of the colony's militia from May 1679 to May 1680.

In May 1680 he was elected governor of the colony to succeed Governor John Cranston who died in office in March, and served three consecutive terms, ending in 1683. During the period from 1686 to 1689 when the New England colonies had their charters revoked, and their governments fell under the Dominion of New England, Sanford served as a member on the council of Sir Edmund Andros, the governor of the dominion.

Sanford wrote his will in 1701, and it was proved on 1 September of that year.

=== Personal life ===
With his first wife, Mary Brenton, Sanford had one child who died in infancy. In 1674, Sanford married Mary Coddington (1654–1693), with whom he had six children. Mary was the daughter of governor William Coddington. His granddaughter, Margaret Sanford, married Massachusetts Governor Thomas Hutchinson, a great-great-grandson of William and Anne Hutchinson. Sanford was succeeded as governor by his brother-in-law, William Coddington Jr.

== See also ==
- List of colonial governors of Rhode Island
- Colony of Rhode Island and Providence Plantations
