= Capt. John Mawdsley House =

Historic house in Rhode Island, United States

- U.S. National Register of Historic Places
- U.S. National Historic Landmark District – Contributing property
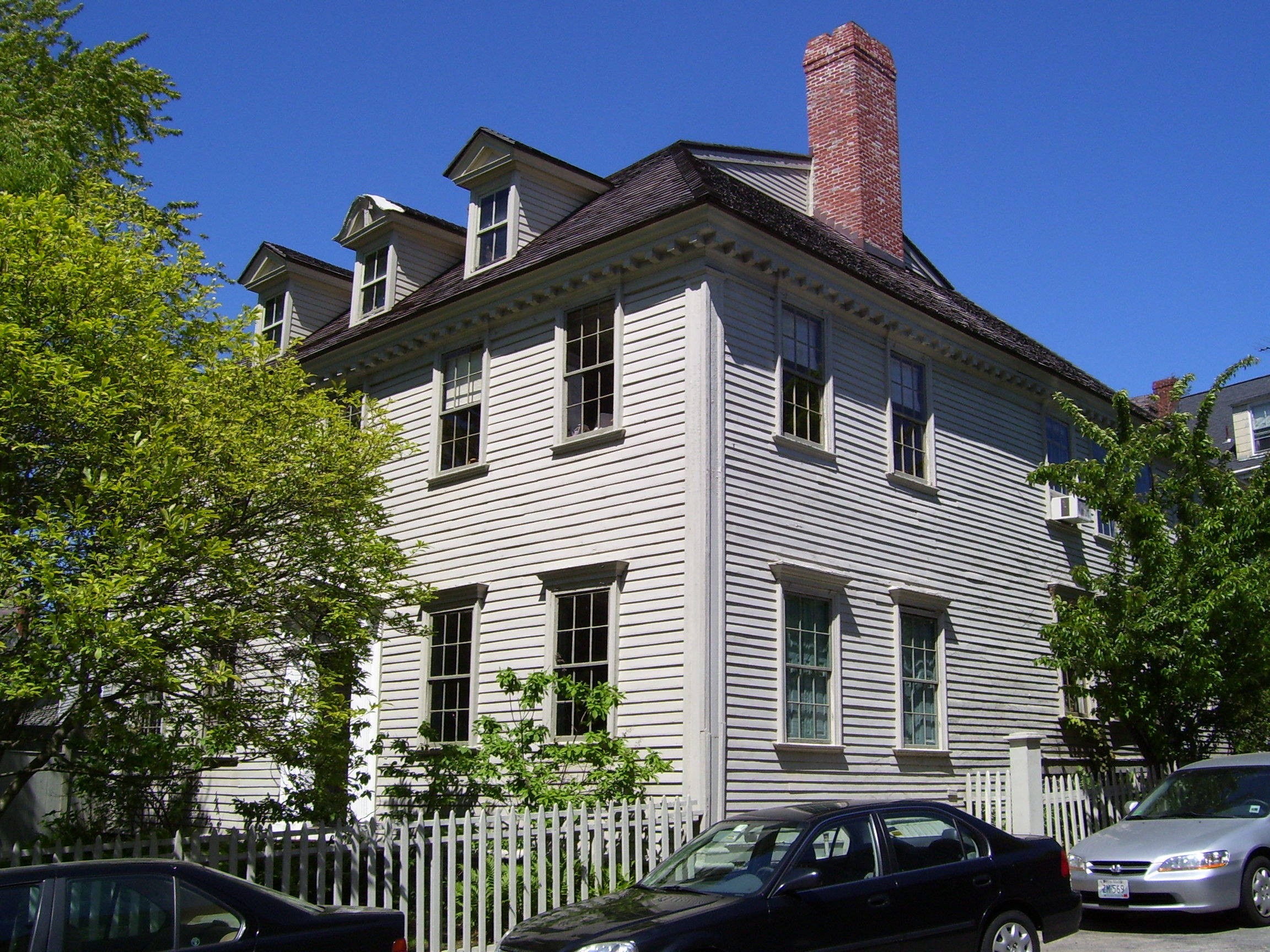
- Mawdsley House in 2008

- Location within Rhode Island
- Location: Newport, Rhode Island
- Coordinates: 41°29′3″N 71°18′44″W
- Built: 1680
- Part of: Newport Historic District (ID68000001)
- NRHP reference No.: 83000180

Significant dates
- Added to NRHP: July 2, 1983
- Designated NHLDCP: November 24, 1968

The Captain John Mawdsley House, located at 228 Spring Street, is one of the oldest houses in Newport, Rhode Island.

The earliest rear part of the house was built on Spring Street before 1680, probably by Jireh Bull. Bull married Godsgift Arnold, daughter of Gov. Benedict Arnold. Captain John Mawdsley, a privateer, lived in the house in the eighteenth century and constructed the large front addition to the house. The Mawdsley House is located on 228 Spring Street and was added to the National Register of Historic Places in 1983. The house was owned by Historic New England (SPNEA) until it was sold in the late twentieth century.

== See also ==
- List of the oldest buildings in Rhode Island
- Henry Bull House
- Jireh Bull Blockhouse
- National Register of Historic Places listings in Newport County, Rhode Island

== Images ==
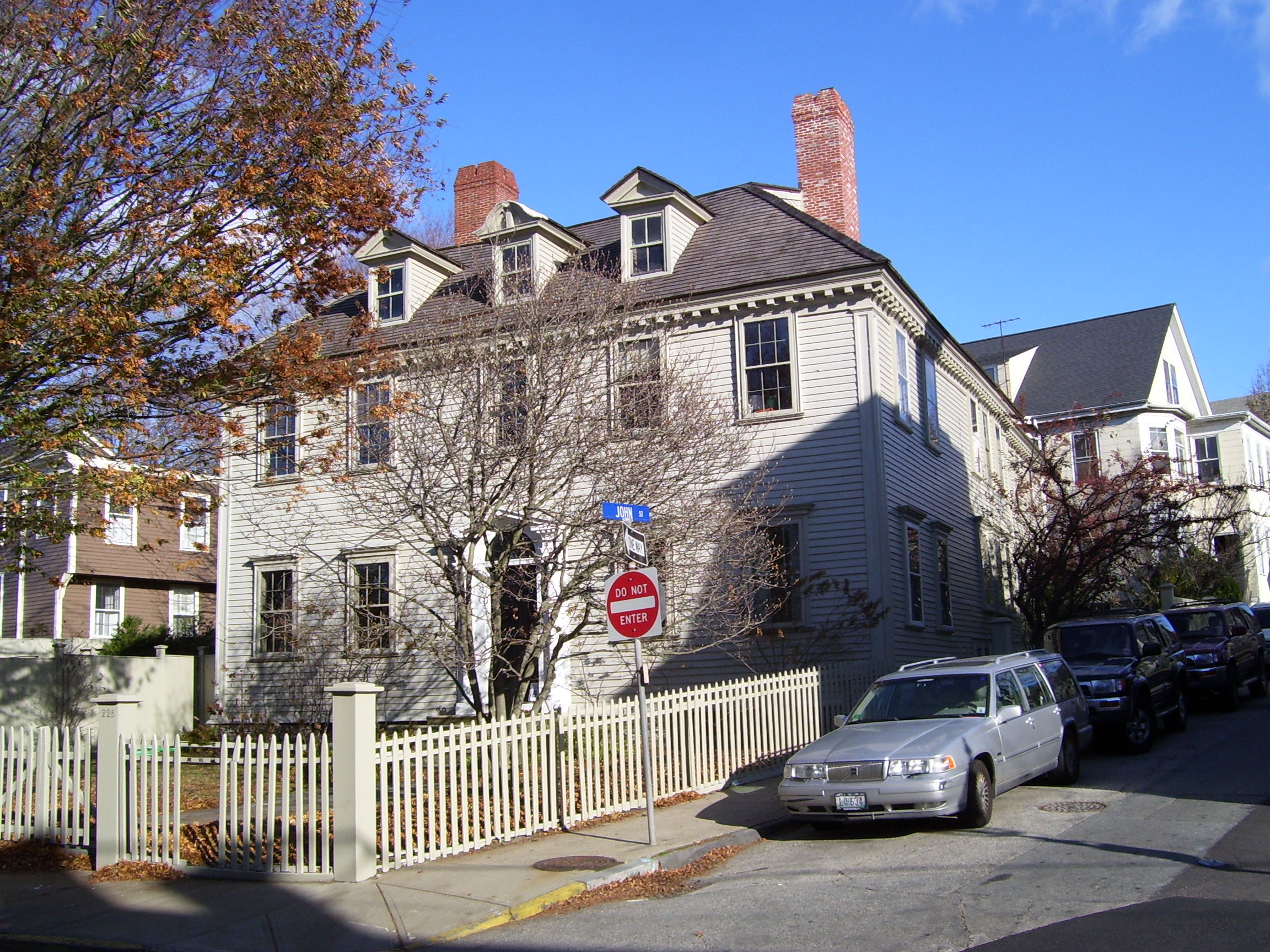
Capt. John Mawdsley House view from Spring Street

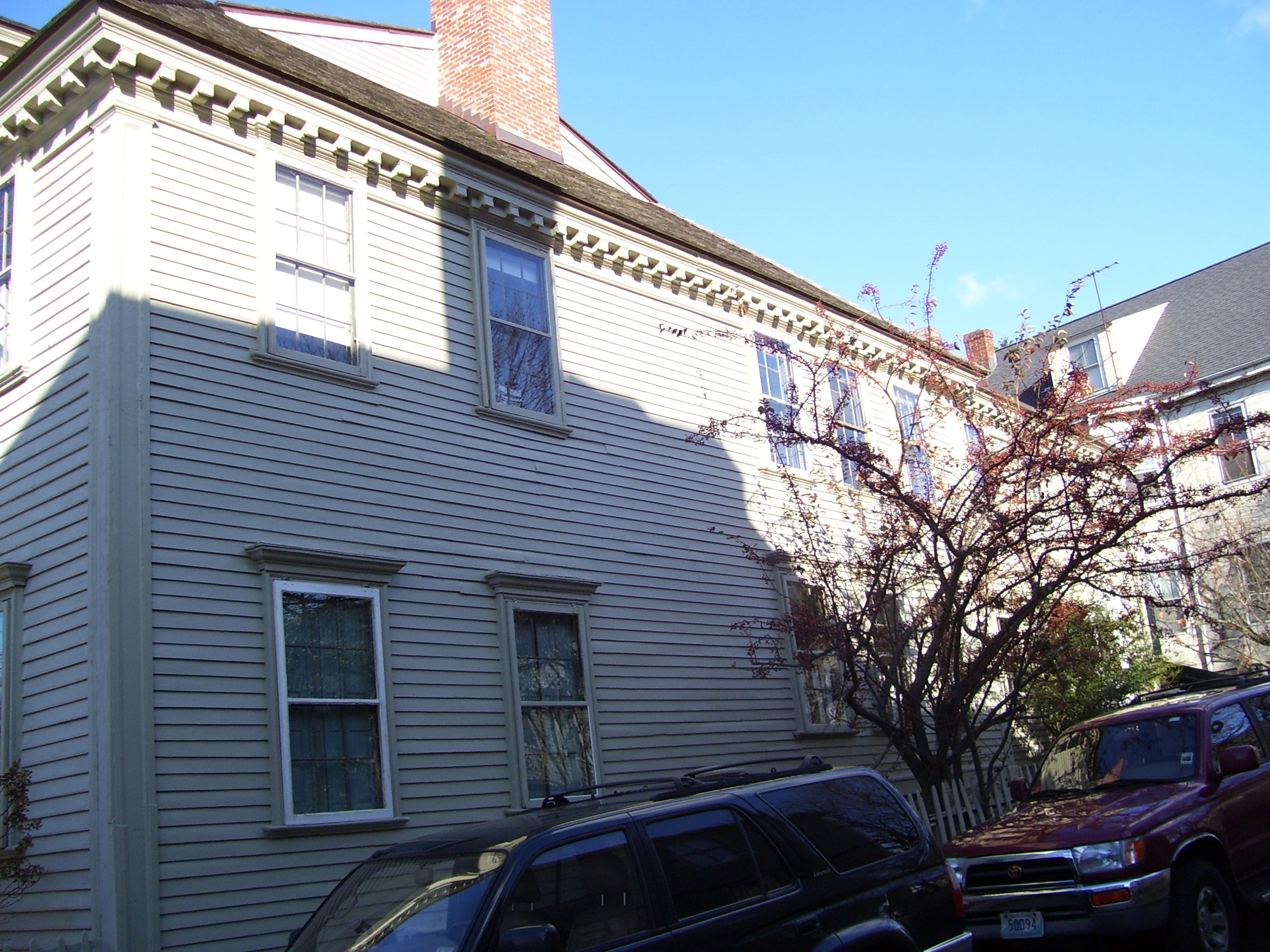
sideview of the Capt. John Mawdsley House

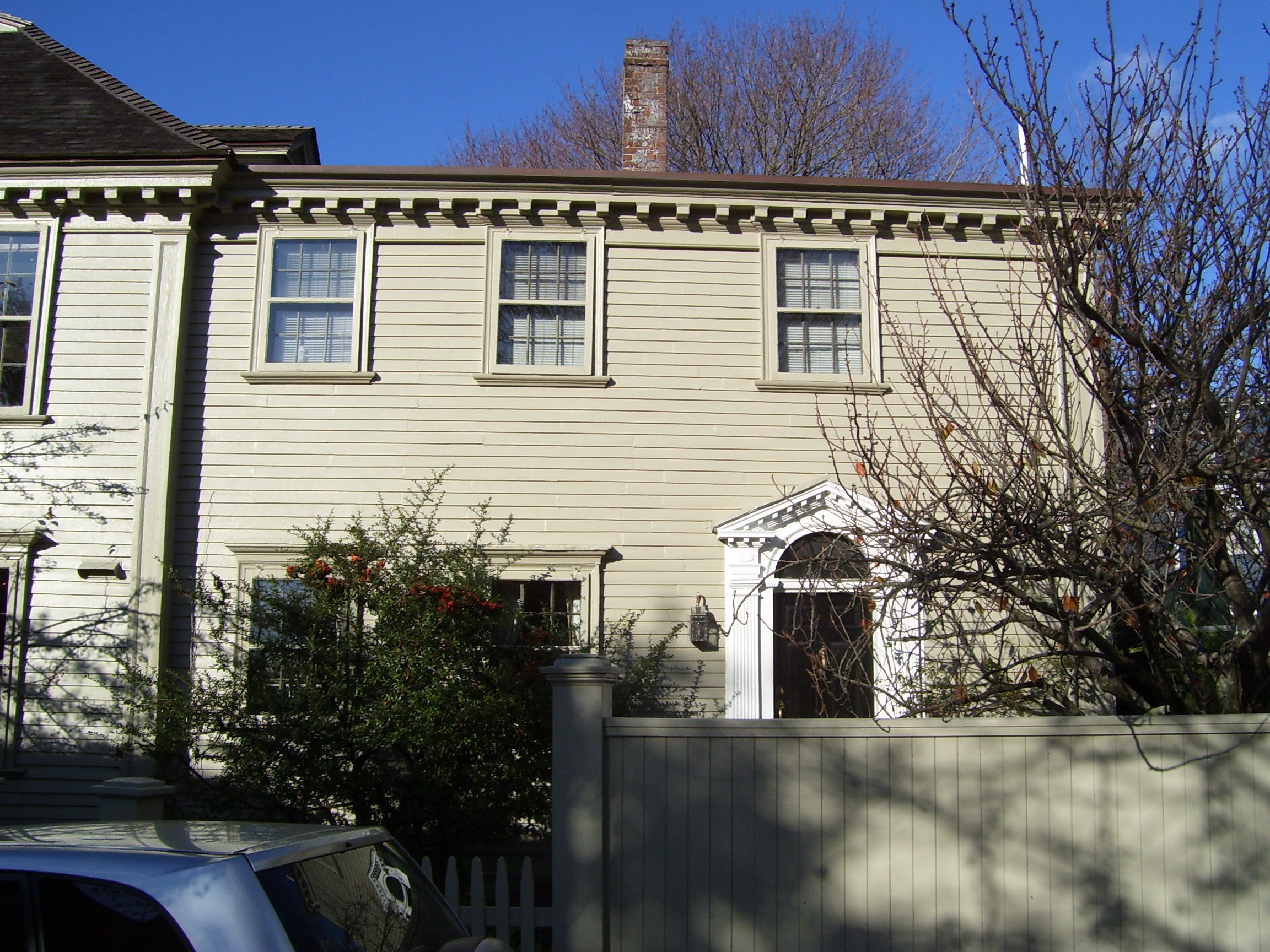
view of the back ca. 1675 section of the Capt. John Mawdsley House

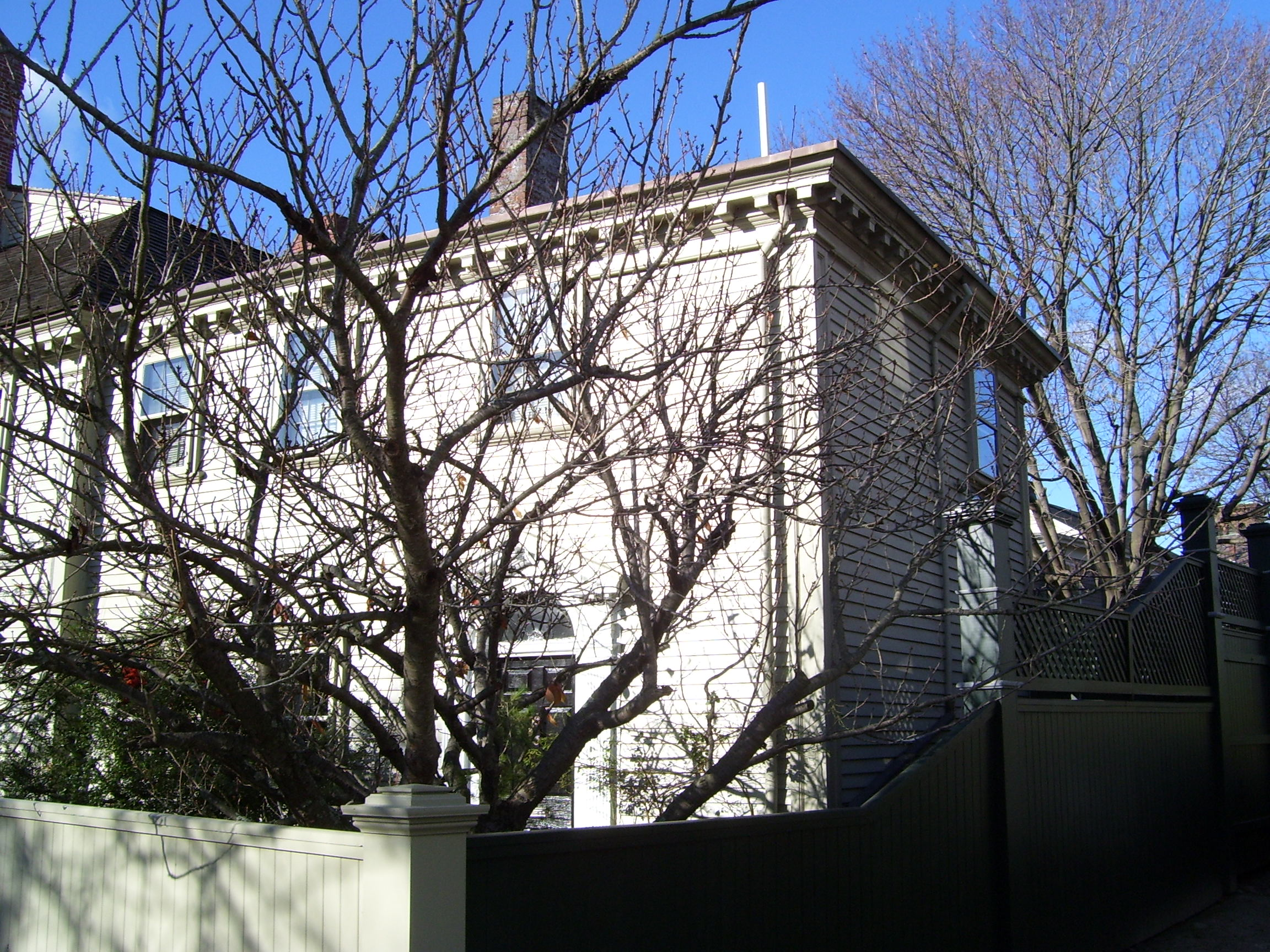
view of the ca. 1675 rear section of the Capt. John Mawdsley House

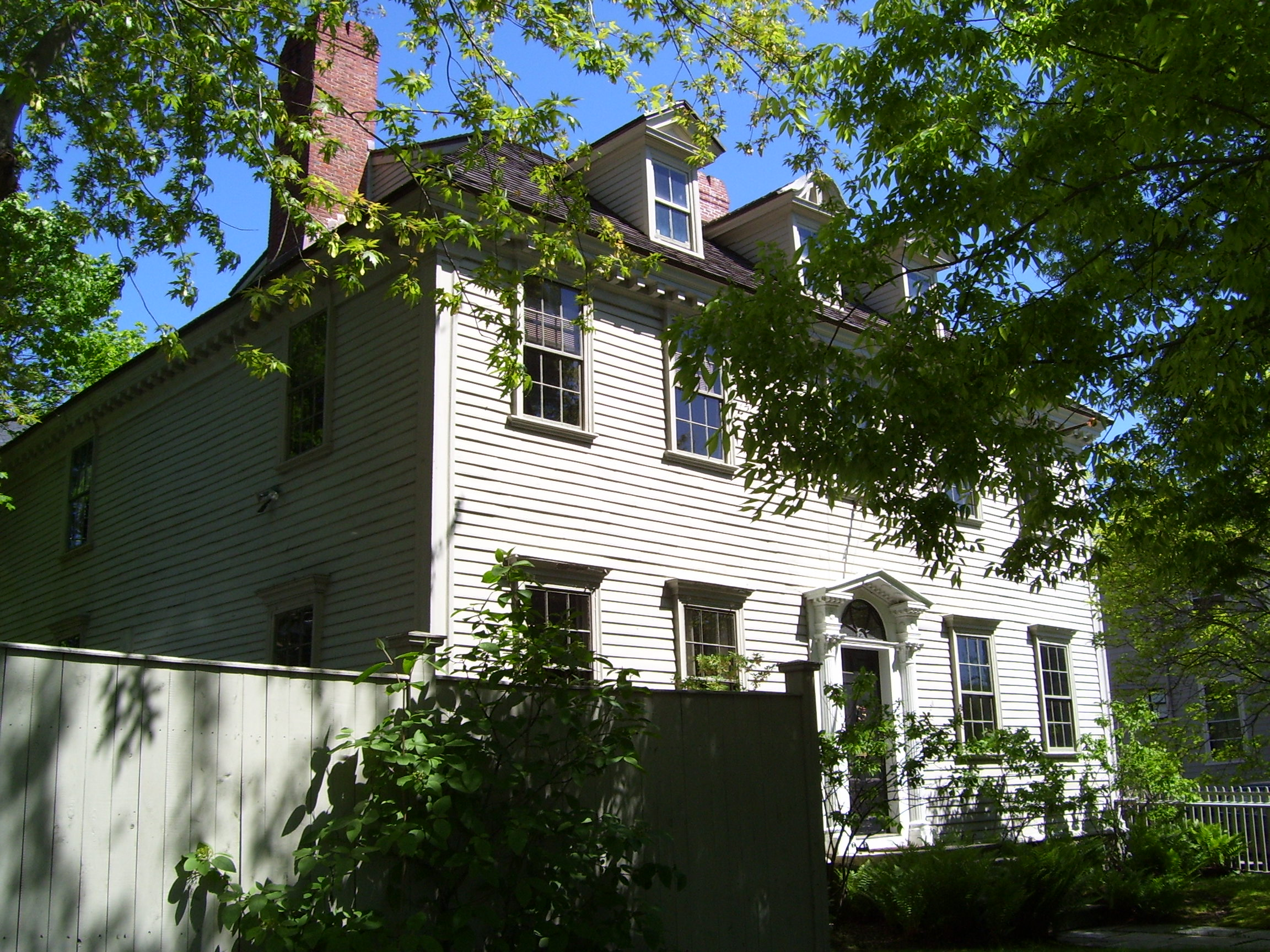
Capt. John Mawdsley House

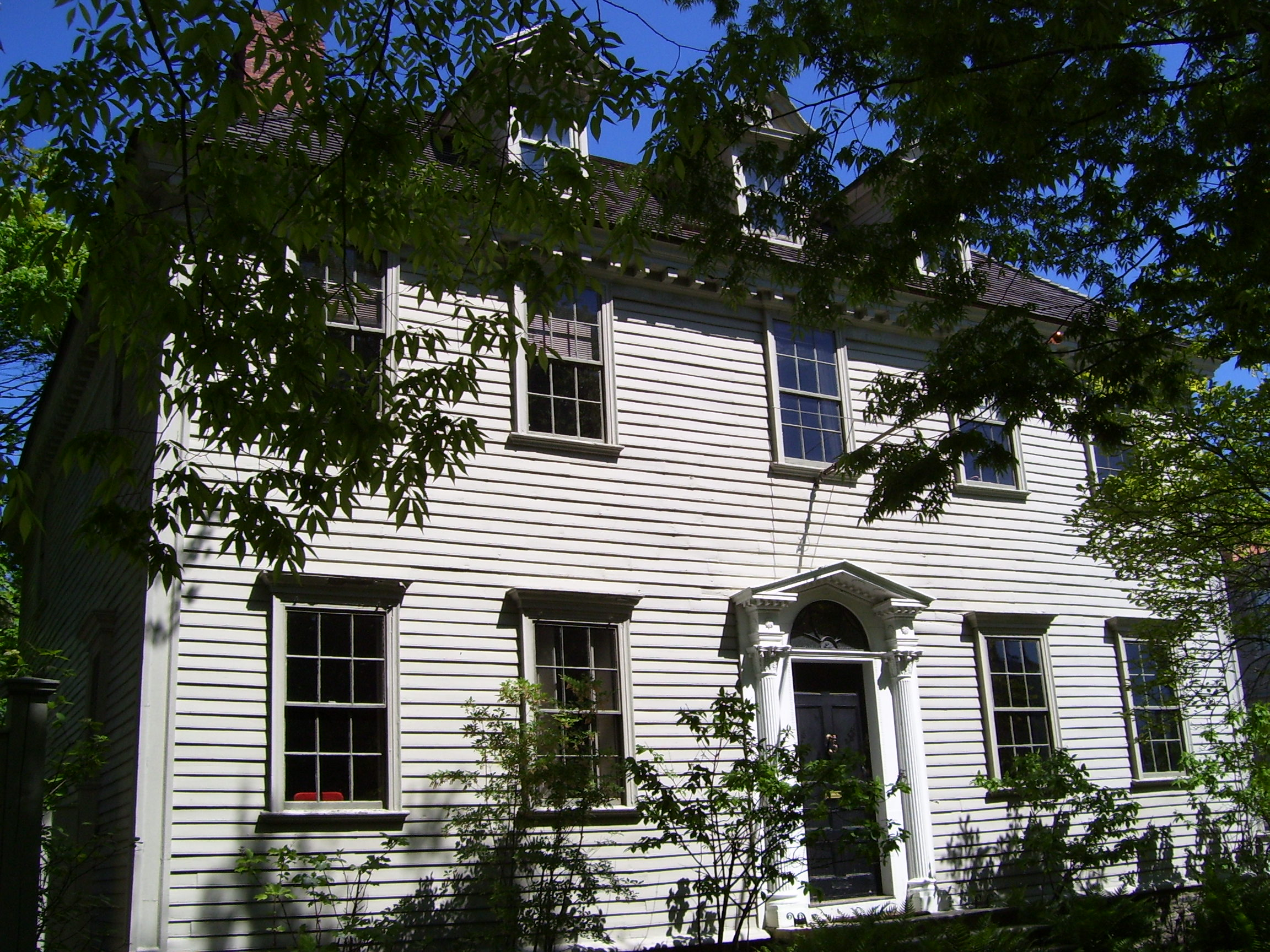
Capt. John Mawdsley House
