= Governor Peleg Sanford House =

Coordinates: 41°29′27″N 71°18′47″W

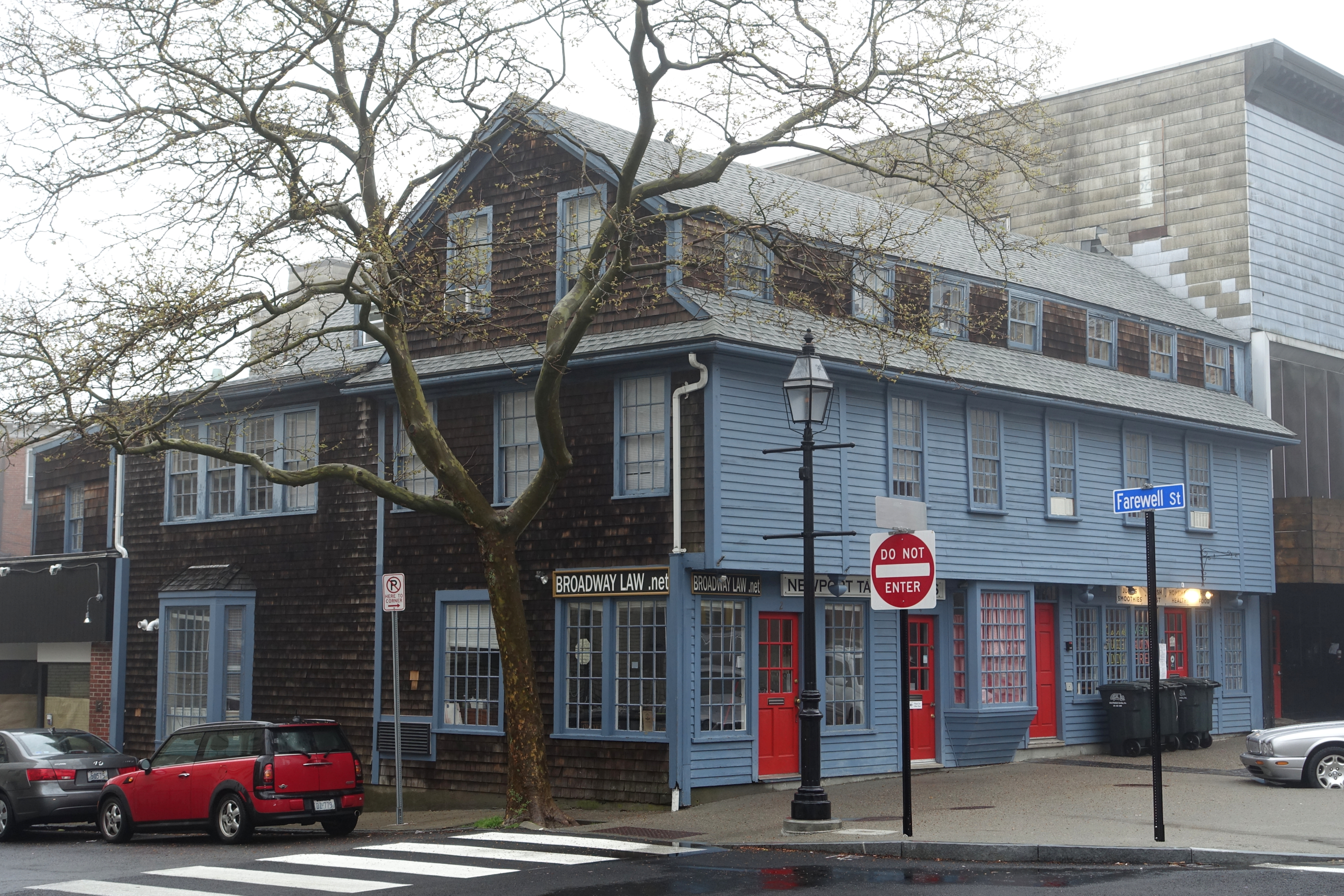
Governor Peleg Sanford House

Governor Peleg Sanford House is one of the oldest houses in Rhode Island, possibly dating to the 1640s and certainly before the death of Peleg Sanford in 1701. The building is located at 2-6 Broadway in Newport, Rhode Island, and "Newport's most important surviving seventeenth-century buildings are found in the West Broadway Neighborhood." Local historians claim:

"the original part of the building was the home of Peleg Sanford, Governor of the Colony of Rhode Island between 1680 and 1683. He built this house sometime before his death in 1701, probably as early as the 1640s. By 1827, the building had been modified to include a storefront, reflecting Broadway's change from a residential to a commercial area. The building was enlarged again in 1845, and a mix of Greek Revival and Colonial elements were added. Many Newporters remember the store as "Lalli's" for the family that operated a variety store and stand in this building for 63 years. In 1923, P. Joseph Lalli bought the tobacco store located here and members of the Lalli family ran the store until 1986."

In 2000 the Newport Historical Society awarded the building its Historic Preservation Award in 2000.

== See also ==
- List of the oldest buildings in Rhode Island
