= William Jordy =

American architectural historian (1917–1997)

William H. Jordy (1917 – 10 August 1997) was "the leading scholar of American architecture to emerge in the generation after Henry-Russell Hitchcock". At the time of his death, Jordy was Henry Ledyard Goddard Professor Emeritus of Art History at Brown University, where he taught for many years.

== Early life ==
Jordy's father was an accountant in Poughkeepsie, New York. Jordy attended Bard College (1935 to 9), majoring in art and history. In 1937 he made a cubist collage titled "Rebels take Madrid". He also made a mural of scenes at a mechanized dairy. His senior essay compared Henry Adams and Walt Whitman, one a rationalist and skeptic, the other an intuitive thinker.

Jordy then studied at New York University Institute of Fine Arts with teachers Karl Lehmann, Erwin Panofsky, and Richard Krautheimer. He married Sarah (Sal) Stroughton Spock, sister of Benjamin Spock.

Jordy's ability to write was recognized in the Army during World War II. For instance, he wrote a pamphlet "Right to be Proud: History of the 65th division in Germany".

In 1946 he began American Studies at Yale University. There his teachers included Ralph Henry Gabriel, George Heard Hamilton, Carol Meeks, and Christopher Tunnard. He returned to a study of Henry Adams, who saw "history as a sequential force". Jordy received the Ph.D. in 1948 with the thesis Henry Adams: Science and Power in History. The biographer notes that Jordy absorbed Adams' "factual, symbolic, aesthetic, and temporal considerations".

By 1950 Jordy was teaching history of art at the NYU Institute alongside Sumner Crosby, George Kubler, and Vincent Scully.

== Career ==
Jordy studied the historical writings of Henry Adams including his nine-volume history of the United States and The Education of Henry Adams which proposed history as a response to social forces. Jordy published Henry Adams: Scientific Historian in 1952 with Yale University Press.

In 1955 he joined historian of science Donald Fleming at the Department of Art History at Brown, and began a teaching career, specializing in architectural history.

His books include two volumes of the five-volume American Buildings and Their Architects series and Buildings of Rhode Island (published posthumously) in the Society of Architectural Historians Buildings of the United States series. He contributed occasionally to the Journal of the Society of Architectural Historians and wrote regularly on architectural subjects for The New Criterion.

== Books ==
- 1952: Henry Adams: Scientific Historian, Yale University Press, New Haven
- 1972: American Buildings and Their Architects: Progressive and Academic Ideals at the Turn of the Twentieth Century, Doubleday, Garden City NY
- 1972: American Buildings and Their Architects: The Impact of European Modernism in the Mid-twentieth Century, Doubleday, Garden City NY
- 1982: (with Christopher P. Monkhouse) Buildings on Paper: Rhode Island Architectural Drawings, 1825-1945, Bell Gallery, List Art Center, Brown University, Providence RI
- 2004: (Ronald J. Onorato and William McKenzie Woodward, contributing editors) Buildings of Rhode Island, Oxford University Press, New York ISBN 0-19-506147-0
- 2005: (Mardes Bacon, editor) "Symbolic essence" and Other Writings on Modern Architecture and American Culture, Temple Hoyne Buell Center for the Study of American Architecture, Yale University Press, New Haven ISBN 0-300-09448-5
