= Jireh Bull Blockhouse =

- Jireh Bull Blockhouse Historic Site
- U.S. National Register of Historic Places
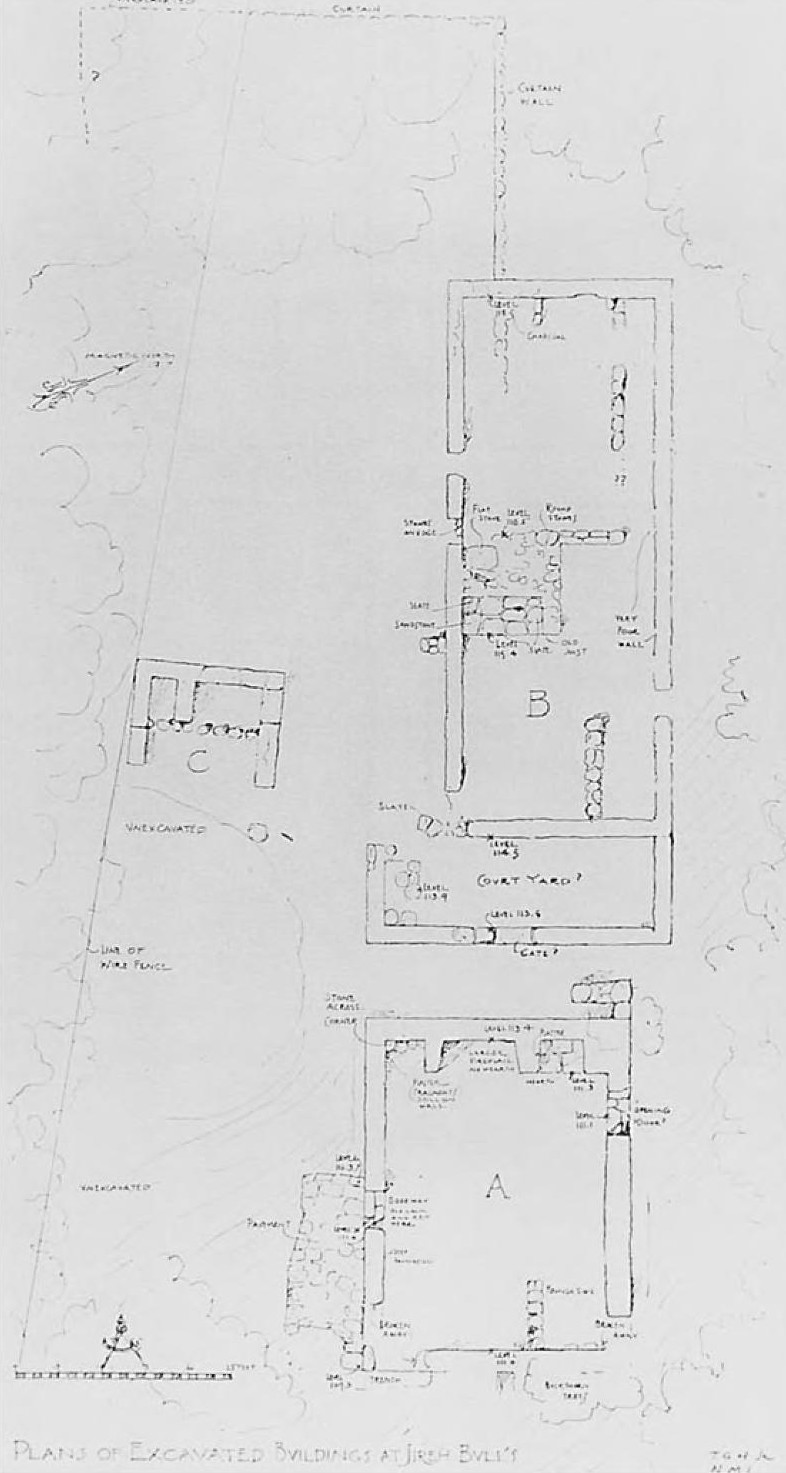
- Drawing of the site by Norman Isham, 1917
- Nearest city: South Kingstown, Rhode Island
- Built: 1657
- NRHP reference No.: 83003869
- Added to NRHP: November 3, 1983

The Jireh Bull Blockhouse (RI-926, also known as the Jireh Bull Garrison House or Jireh Bull Block House) is an historic archaeological site on Middlebridge Road in South Kingstown, Rhode Island. In 1657 a blockhouse was built on the site by Jireh Bull, son of Rhode Island Governor Henry Bull. The stone garrison house was burned by the Native Americans in King Philip's War on December 15, 1675, and fifteen soldiers defending the fort were killed. The site was acquired by the Rhode Island Historical Society in 1925.

The site was added to the National Register of Historic Places in 1983.

== See also ==
- Henry Bull House
- Capt. John Mawdsley House
- National Register of Historic Places listings in Washington County, Rhode Island
