= John Sanford (governor) =

Rhode Island colonial politician (c. 1605–1653)

2nd Governor of Newport and Portsmouth (under Coddington Commission)
- In office 1653–1653
- Preceded by: William Coddington
- Succeeded by: Nicholas Easton as President of all four towns of the colony

Personal details
- Born: c. 1605
- Died: 1653 Portsmouth, Rhode Island
- Spouse(s): Elizabeth Webb; Bridget Hutchinson
- Children: John, Samuel, Eliphalet, Peleg, Endcome, Restcome, William, Esbon, Frances, Elisha, Ann
- Occupation: Cannoneer, Constable, Assistant, Governor

John Sanford (c. 1605 – 1653) was an early settler of Boston, Massachusetts, an original settler of Portsmouth, Rhode Island, and a governor of the combined towns of Portsmouth and Newport in the Rhode Island colony, dying in office after serving for less than a full term. He had some military experience in England, and also was an employee of Massachusetts magistrate John Winthrop's household prior to sailing to New England in 1631 with Winthrop's wife and oldest son. He lived in Boston for six years and was the cannoneer there.

A divisive religious controversy arose in Boston, and Sanford was disarmed for supporting his mother-in-law Anne Hutchinson, who was banished from the Massachusetts Bay Colony. He was then compelled to leave Massachusetts as well; he and many others signed an agreement to form a government, then settled on Rhode Island. Here he became a lieutenant, assistant, chief magistrate of Portsmouth, then governor of the two island towns of Portsmouth and Newport in 1653 following the repeal of William Coddington's commission to govern the island. During his administration, the two island towns slowly negotiated a reunion with the two mainland towns of Providence and Warwick.

== Early life ==
Sanford was probably from Essex, England, and he probably served in the English Army before emigrating from England. He was a trained surveyor, familiar with military matters, and in his inventory were listed some pieces of armor. He was mentioned in a letter from Massachusetts magistrate John Winthrop to his wife, dated 2 March 1629/30, just prior to the sailing of the Winthrop Fleet: "Our 2 boyes and Ja Downinge, Jo Samford and Mary M. and most of my servants are gone this daye towards S Hampton: the good Lord be with them and us all." Earlier references by Winthrop very likely refer to Sanford, as well, dating back to 1624 and concerning "my man-servant John". There was a period of time when "servant John" was not mentioned in Winthrop's correspondence, and this is probably when Sanford was pressed into military service with John Winthrop, Jr. in a disastrous campaign to relieve the Huguenots at the Isle of Rhe. Sanford became experienced in the use of artillery during this campaign in which nearly 60 percent of the English force became casualties.

== Boston ==
After the Winthrop Fleet sailed in 1630, Sanford remained in England and was in almost constant contact with John Winthrop, Jr., serving as his business agent. He made many purchases for the New England colony, and presented his bills to Winthrop for payment. In October 1630, the younger Winthrop met Captain Pierce of the ship Lyon, and made arrangements for loading provisions destined for the colonies. The following month, Captain Pierce reported that the ship was fully laden with supplies, and it set sail in December with mostly cargo, but also 20 or more passengers, including Roger Williams. The Lyon returned to England about May 1631, and was loaded in July and early August for its next voyage to New England. In mid-August the ship once again set sail, with about 60 passengers, including Mrs. Margaret Winthrop (the wife of John Sr.), John Winthrop Jr. and his wife, John Sanford, Elizabeth Webb (the future wife of Sanford), and Rev. John Eliot. Upon arriving in New England, Sanford was made a member of the church in Boston within a month, and became a freeman the following year. In 1633 he and others were chosen to oversee the building of cart bridges over Muddy River and Stony River. With his military background, he was appointed the following year to assess the status of ordnance, powder, and shot, and to report his findings to the court. Later the same year he was chosen as cannoneer for the fort at Boston, and was paid 20 pounds for the previous two years, and the following year. In 1636 he was once again chosen cannoneer for the fort, and overseer of the arms and ammunition, being paid 30 pounds for himself and his assistant.

In 1636 an issue erupted in Boston that would consume the attention of the magistrates for nearly two years. Sanford's mother-in-law, Anne Hutchinson (from his second wife Bridget), and her brother-in-law, John Wheelwright, were attracting many converts to their religious views which were at odds with the rigid Puritan dogma. Both of them were ultimately accused of blasphemy for their religious opinions, and banished from the colony. In November 1637 Sanford and other supporters were disarmed when their guns, pistols, swords, powder, and shot were to be delivered to the authorities because the "opinions and revelations of Mr. Wheelwright and Mrs. Hutchinson have seduced and led into dangerous errors many of the people here in New England." Many of these supporters fled to other colonies, and on 7 March 1638, while still in Massachusetts, Sanford and many other supporters of Mrs. Hutchinson signed a document to establish a Christian-based government. With the encouragement of Roger Williams, they bought land of the Indians and settled on the island of Aquidneck in the Narragansett Bay, naming the settlement Pocasset, but later changed the name to Portsmouth.

== Portsmouth ==
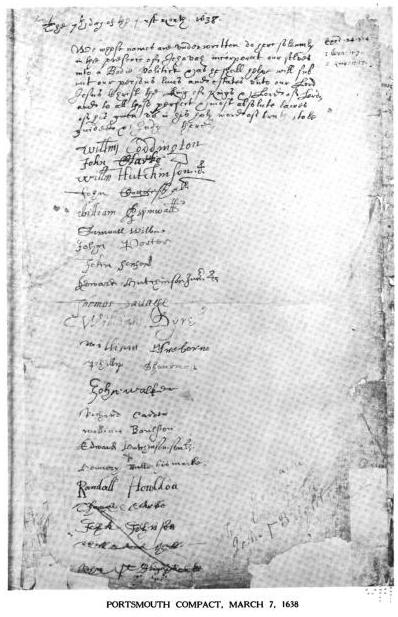
Portsmouth Compact with Sanford's name eighth on the list

Sanford was in Portsmouth by May 1638 when he was present at a general meeting of inhabitants, and when he and John Coggeshall were ordered to lay out a meeting house on a neck of land. The same month he had six acres allotted to him on the north side of the "Great Cove." In 1640 he was one of the Portsmouth men selected to effect the reunion of his town with Newport, and at the same time was chosen as Constable, then the following year was made a freeman of the colony. In 1644 he was called Lieutenant for the island, and from 1647 to 1649 he served as Assistant to the President of the colony. The President at the time presided over the two island towns of Portsmouth and Newport, as well as the two mainland towns of Providence and Warwick. William Coddington, who had previously served as governor of the two island towns from 1640 to 1647, did not care for the combined government with the mainland towns. In 1651 he went to England, and was able to obtain a commission to remove the island towns from the government with Providence and Warwick. Coddington then became Governor of the island towns in 1651, and in June of that year Sanford was chosen as the head magistrate of Portsmouth. In 1653 Sanford succeeded Coddington as the governor of the island towns after the repeal of Coddington's commission. Negotiations for the reunion of the four towns of the colony took place during Sanford's administration, and the statute books and town records from the period of separation were demanded from Coddington. Also, commissions were issued to several prominent members of the colony to prepare for military actions against the Dutch, if warranted. Sanford's term was short-lived as he died in office sometime after the signing of his will on 22 June 1653, but before his inventory was taken on 15 November of that year. His widow, Bridget, later married William Phillips, and died in 1698 in Boston, leaving a will.

== Family ==
Sanford married twice, first to Elizabeth Webb, who at one time lived at Groton Manor, the home of John Winthrop in England; this marriage produced two children. Following Elizabeth's death, Sanford married Bridget, the daughter of William Hutchinson and his famous wife, Anne (Marbury) Hutchinson, this marriage producing nine children, many of whom died young. William Hutchinson served for one year as the Judge (Governor) of Portsmouth. Sanford's oldest son with Bridget, Peleg Sanford, was the colonial Rhode Island governor from 1680 to 1683. Sanford's oldest son with his first wife, John Jr., married, as his second wife, Mary (Gorton) Greene, the daughter of Rhode Island President Samuel Gorton.

== See also ==
- List of colonial governors of Rhode Island
- List of early settlers of Rhode Island
- Colony of Rhode Island and Providence Plantations

Political offices
Preceded by William Coddington	Governor of Newport and Portsmouth; 1653–1653	Succeeded by none
