= Stephen Northup House =

Historic house in Rhode Island, United States

- U.S. National Register of Historic Places
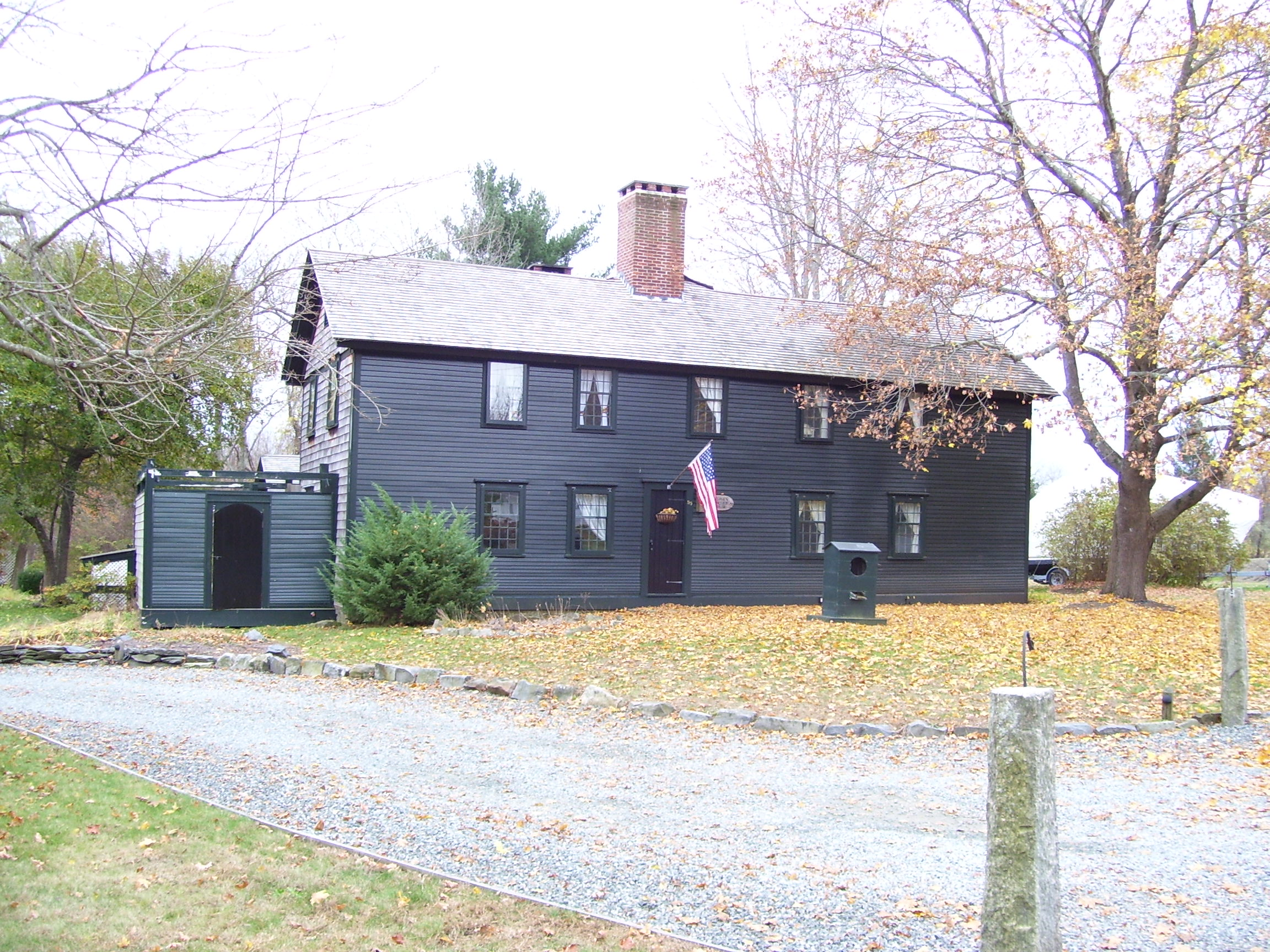
- Northup House in 2008

- Location within Rhode Island Location within the United States
- Location: North Kingstown, Rhode Island
- Coordinates: 41°33′5″N 71°26′52″W
- Area: less than one acre
- Built: 1660
- Architect: Stephen Northup
- MPS: North Kingstown MRA
- NRHP reference No.: 85001653
- Added to NRHP: July 19, 1985

The Stephen Northup House (also known as the "Stephen Northrup House") is a historic house at 99 Featherbed Lane in North Kingstown, Rhode Island.

== History ==
The original house on the site may have been built in 1660 with an addition around 1712 most likely completed by Stephen Northup Jr. The original building may have burned during King Philip's War, which destroyed most of the houses in the state in the 1670s. Later owners made additions to the structure. The house was added to the National Register of Historic Places in 1985. The house is owned by the Bogue family. They have added two sizable additions to the house and have restored all of the interior.

== Stephen Northup family ==
In 1645 Stephen Northup emigrated from Great Britain to New England. He became the Town Sergeant of Providence in 1660, and took an Oath of Allegiance on 19 May 1671 in Kingstowne. Stephen Northup Jr. was born 1660, the first son of Stephen Northup Sr. Stephen Northup Sr. lived at North Kingston but conflicting records have him living in Providence at the same time.

He was granted a plot of land (25 acres) on October 2, 1655, by the "Towne Meeting of Providence, R.I." At another "Towne Meeting" on Aug 27, 1656, he was granted commonage equal to any other townsman, the right to vote, the right of being a "freeman" and proprietor in the town of Providence. On February 8, 1662, Northup Sr. sold a plot of land (possibly that same 25 acres) in the Providence region and moved to Kingstowne.

What is known is the Northup family started with the seniors marriage to Sarah Harrington in about 1654, and gave birth to their first child (Stephen Jr.) in 1660 with records indicating birth in the town of Kingstowne (North Kingstown) and Providence. Stephen Sr. officially moved to Kingstowne in 1662 but clearly had an established residence in place since his second son, Benjamin, was born that same year in the town of North Kingstown (according to town records). The likely scenario of events to help to accurately date this home is to project that Stephen Sr. acquired the North Kingstown property at, or around, the year of 1660 with the intention of moving his new family there. However, his official record of North Kingstown residency is not until 1662. With these facts at hand, one can surmise that during this two-year period, Northup prepared his North Kingstown property for construction of his home completing it early 1662. This places the actual beginning construction of the Stephen Northup House within the time period of 1660, or 1661.

== See also ==
- National Register of Historic Places listings in Washington County, Rhode Island
- List of the oldest buildings in Rhode Island
