= Portrait of Catherine Brass Yates =

Painting by Gilbert Stuart

Catherine Brass Yates
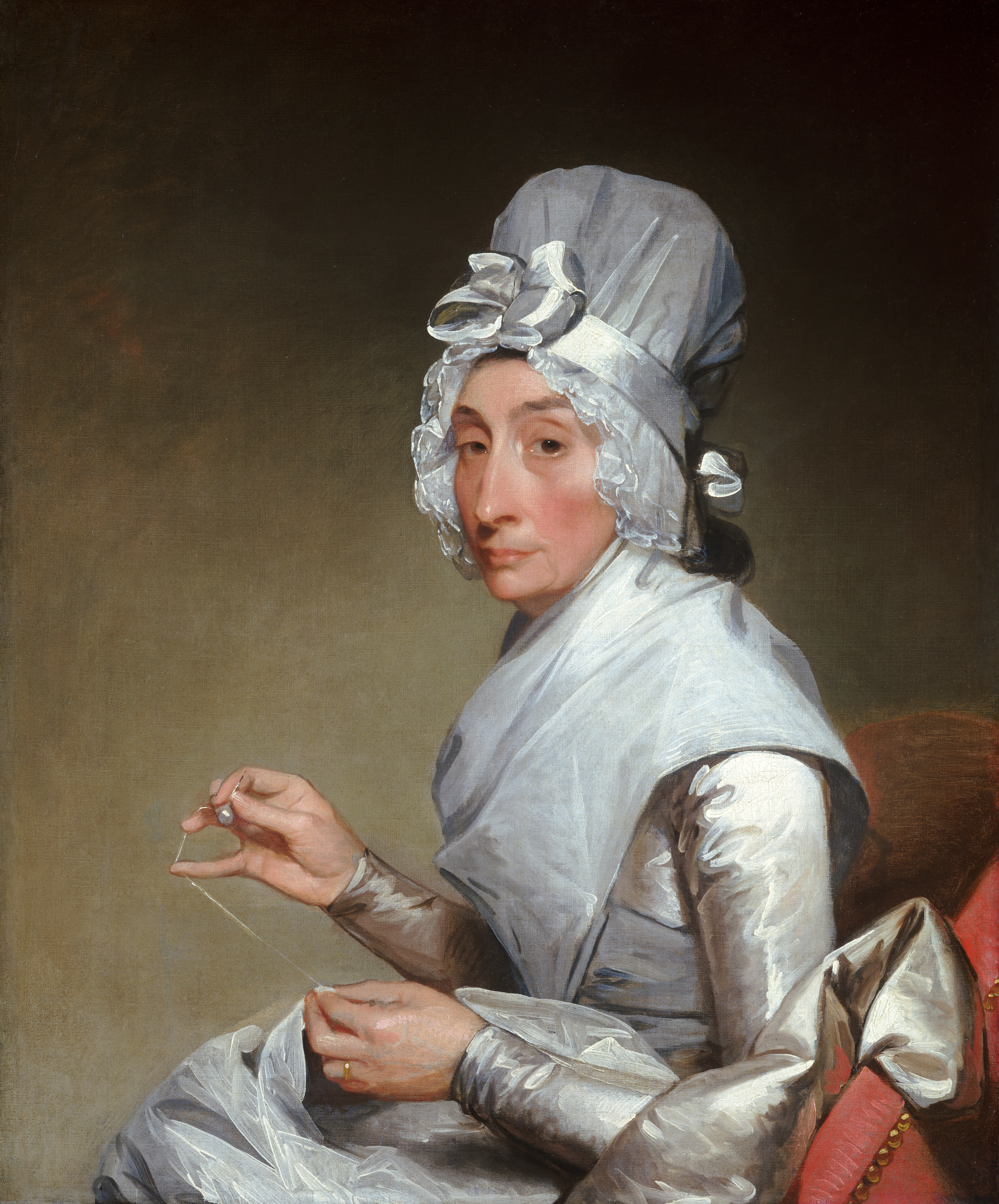
- Artist: Gilbert Stuart
- Year: 1793-1794
- Medium: Oil on canvas
- Dimensions: 76.2 cm × 63.5 cm (30.0 in × 25.0 in)
- Location: National Gallery of Art, Washington, D.C.

Catherine Brass Yates is an oil-on-canvas painting undertaken in 1793–1794 by the American artist Gilbert Stuart, depicting Catherine Brass Yates, the wife of Richard Yates, a New York merchant.

== Painting ==
The painting shows Catherine Brass Yates, the wife of Richard Yates, a New York merchant; it was painted in oil on canvas in 1793–94. Stuart painted a portrait of Richard in the same period. Timothy Cahill, the editor of Art Conservator magazine considers that the Portrait of Mrs Richard Yates is "regarded as among the finest American portraits ever made".

On returning to the United States from England and Ireland in 1793, Stuart found that the type of portrait in demand differed from those he had painted in Europe. The Yankee merchants' taste was for realism, so he portrays Catherine Yates, with her bony face and appraising glance, as too busy with her sewing to take time off to pose for the artist. Using different paint mediums and paying meticulous attention to detail, he employs a variety of techniques for the fabrics, sewing implements, wedding ring, skin tones, and fingernails.

The painting was acquired in 1940 by the National Gallery of Art, Washington, D.C. The gallery consider that Stuart's painting is "one of his most compelling and unified efforts at conveying character", and "one of America's most famous paintings, both as an artistic masterpiece and as a visual symbol of the early republic's rectitude". "The painter, Stuart used the stiff angular lines of Mrs. Yates' silhouette so that he could communicate her capability and sharpness". "The surfaces of the painting also showed the virtuosity that Stuart had, for example the reflections of the coral upholstery".

== Sources ==
- Barratt, Carrie Rebora; Miles, Ellen Gross (2004). Gilbert Stuart. New York, NY: Metropolitan Museum of Art. ISBN 978-1-58839-122-3.
- Cahill, Timothy (Fall 2009). "Unraveling a Mystery" (PDF). Art Conservator. 4 (2). Williamstown, MA: Williamstown Art Conservation Center. Archived from the original (PDF) on 2015-10-06.
