= Henry Bull House =

House in Rhode Island USA (1639–1912)

Coordinates: 41.4911°N 71.3123°W

Henry Bull House

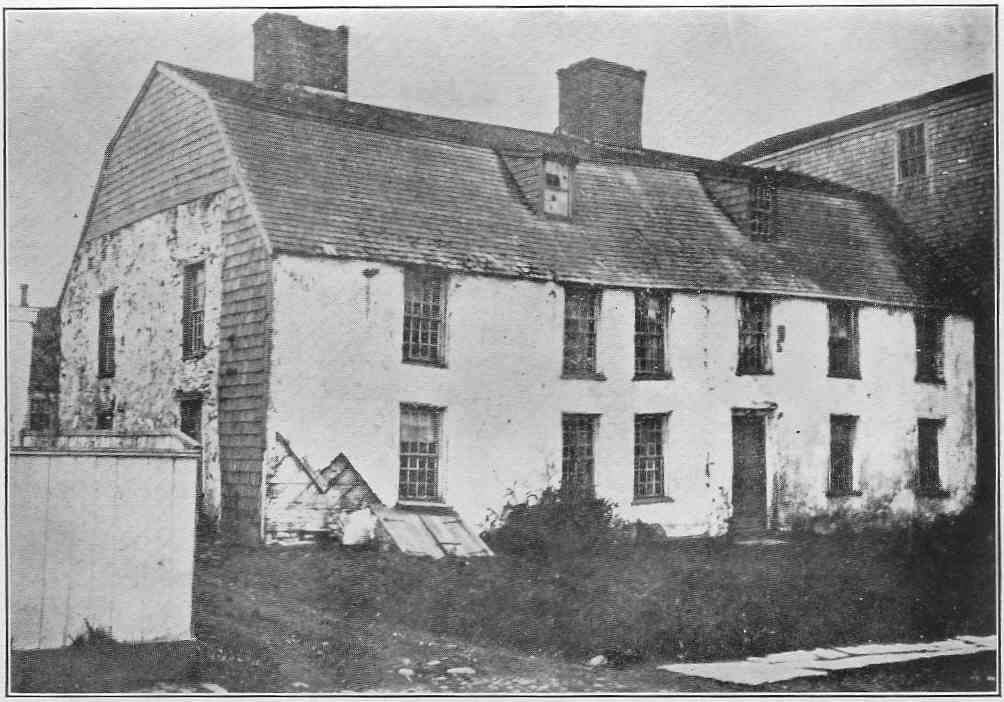
c. 1865–70

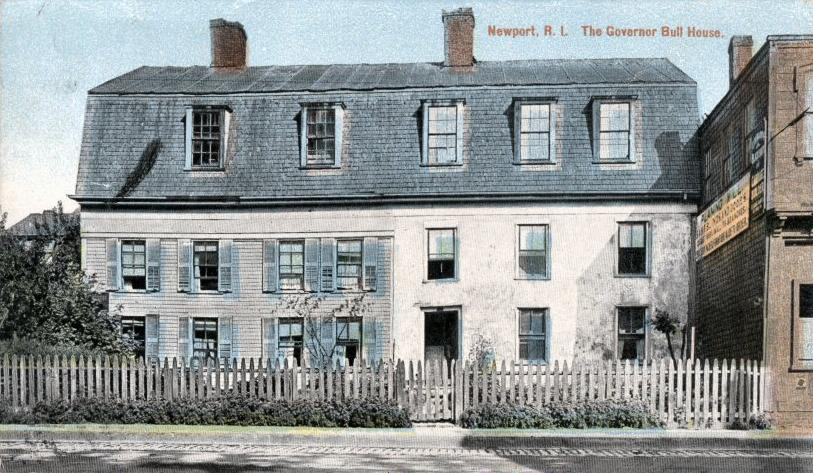
ca.1900 postcard

Governor Henry Bull House, in Newport, Rhode Island was purported to be the oldest house in Rhode Island, with parts of the house dating to 1639. It was destroyed by fire in December 1912.

The Henry Bull house was located on the eastern side of Spring Street in Newport near modern-day Bull Street and Broadway. According to turn-of-the-twentieth-century research by Norman Isham, the back part of the stone house was built around 1639 by Henry Bull, a Quaker leader and one of the original settlers of Portsmouth and Newport. Bull served as a colonial militia officer and jail keeper. The original Newport jail may have been part of the house. Henry Bull died at the house in 1694 and was the last survivor of the original founders of Rhode Island. Large modifications were made to the house in later decades. Henry's son, Jireh Bull, constructed a large fortified house in South Kingstown, Rhode Island which was demolished during King Philip's War. A fire burned and destroyed the Henry Bull House on December 29, 1912.

== See also ==
- Jireh Bull Blockhouse
- Capt. John Mawdsley House
