= Onorato Candiota =

Italian professor of philosophy and math

- Born: Unknown; Altamura, Kingdom of Naples
- Died: after 1808; Unknown
- Occupations: professor of "philosophy and math" at Real Convitto di Bari, in Bari, Italy

Onorato Candiota (... – after 1808) was an Italian professor of philosophy and math at the Real Convitto di Bari, in Bari, Italy. He lived between the 18th and 19th centuries. The exact dates and places of birth and death are currently unknown, even though it is known that he was from Altamura, Italy. He's best known for his participation in the so-called Altamuran Revolution (1799). He died short after 1808.

In 1796 he was appointed as member of Accademia dei Georgofili in Florence. Moreover, following the founding of Istituto nazionale della Repubblica Napoletana in 1799, he was also appointed as member of that academy in the class of physics, natura history and chemistry. He was also member of the Royal Society of Encouragement to Natural Sciences of Naples.

A street in Altamura, Italy has been named after him (via Onorato Candiota).

== Altamuran Revolution ==
Onorato Candiota, together with his brother Gian Giacomo Candiota, was from a wealthy family. During the Altamuran Revolution (1799), he defended the city of Altamura and, because of this, he was jailed together with his brother in the prison Forte di Brindisi; he was released together with the other people imprisoned, thanks to the Treaty of Florence (1801). When they came back, they looked very different and they weren't recognized by their relatives.

== Works ==
- Onorato Candiota (1790). Elementi di fisica per uso del Real Convitto di Bari.
- Onorato Candiota (1794). Elementi di astronomia per uso del Real Convitto di Bari. Napoli: presso Gennaro Giaccio.
- Onorato Candiota (1804). Memoria su di un nuovo metodo di preparare, seminare, e coltivare il frumento per ritirarne il quadruplo del prodotto ordinario. Napoli.

== Bibliography ==
- Vincenzo Vicenti (1998). Arcangela Vicenti e Giuseppe Pupillo (ed.). Medaglioni altamurani del 1799. Cassano Murge.
- Efemeridi letterarie di Roma. Vol. 23. Roma: Venanzio Monaldini librajo al corso. 1794.
- Rassegna pugliese di scienze, lettere ed arti. Tipografia Vecchi. 1887.
- Saverio Daconto (1911). La terra di Bari nel periodo storico del Risorgimento italiano. Vol. 1. Tipografia Vecchi.
