= Gilbert Stuart Birthplace =

Historic house in Rhode Island, United States

- U.S. National Register of Historic Places
- U.S. National Historic Landmark
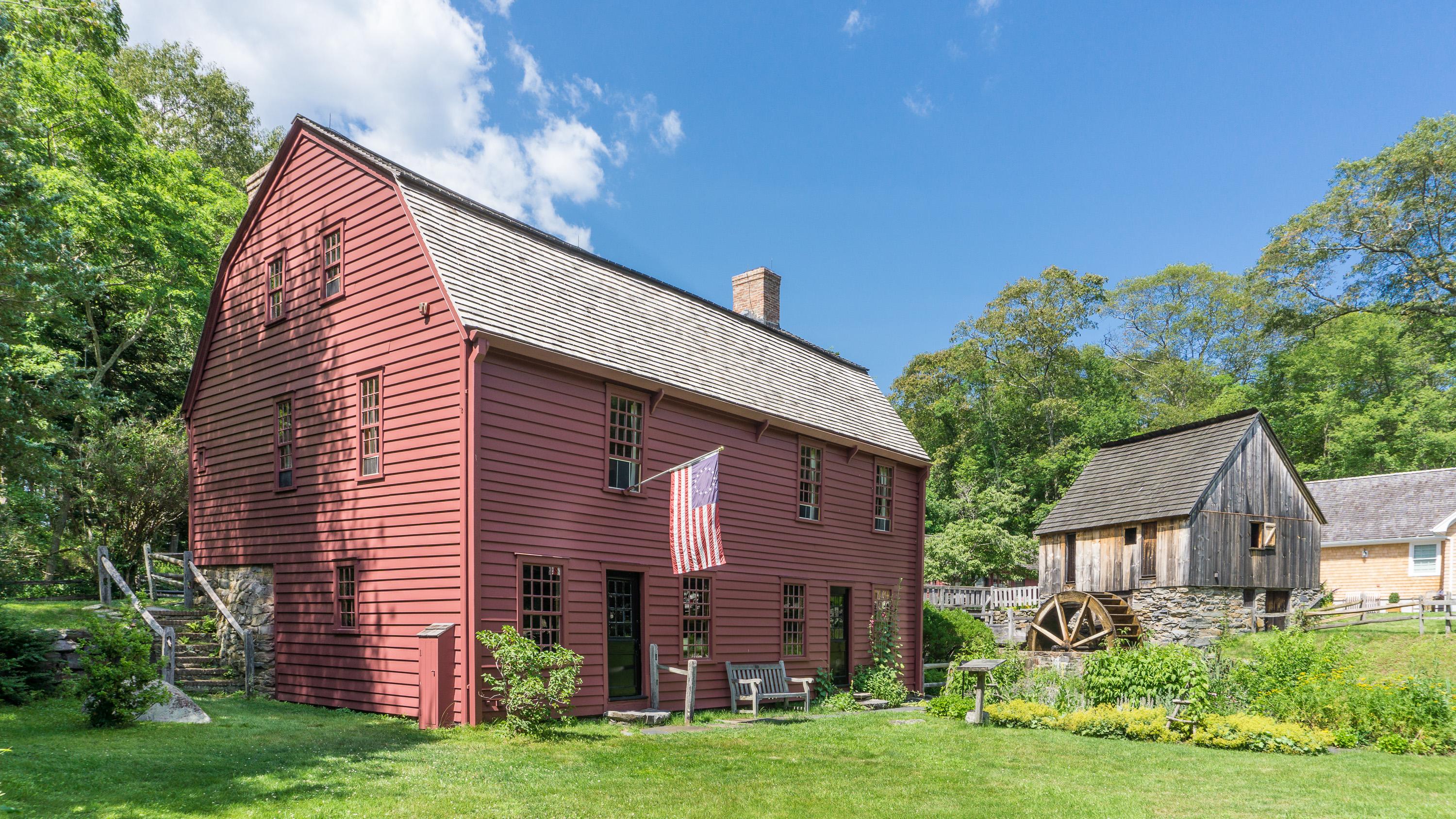
- The house in 2015
- Location: 815 Gilbert Stuart Road, Saunderstown, Rhode Island
- Nearest city: Newport
- Coordinates: 41°31′14″N 71°26′37″W
- Built: 1751
- NRHP reference No.: 66000004

Significant dates
- Added to NRHP: October 15, 1966
- Designated NHL: December 21, 1965

The Gilbert Stuart Birthplace and Museum is located in Saunderstown, Rhode Island. Gilbert Stuart, who was born on December 3, 1755, in the colonial-era house located on the property, became a famous American portraitist of the 18th and 19th centuries. The museum consists of the 1751 house in which Stuart was born, an operational snuff mill, an operational grist mill, a mill pond, streams, a fish ladder, 23 acres of nature trails, an herb garden, and a welcome center and art gallery containing paintings by both Gilbert Stuart and his daughter Jane Stuart.

== History ==
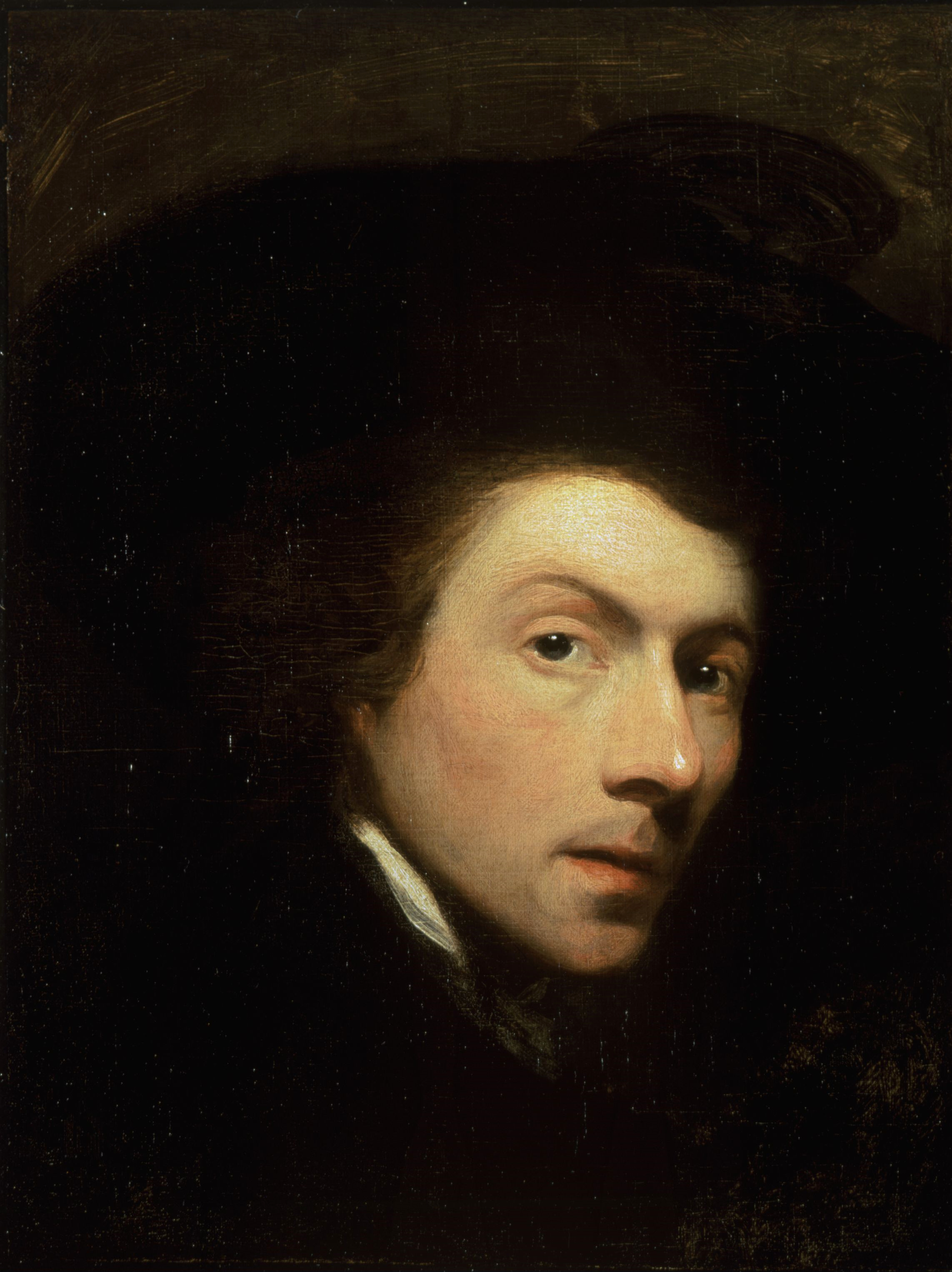
Self portrait of Gilbert Stuart, painted in 1778

The house on the property was built in 1751, and Gilbert Stuart lived there for six years. His father operated the family business in the basement of the house, where a water-powered snuff mill was located. He ground dried tobacco leaves into snuff, a fine powder used widely in the colonial era, and his was actually the first such mill in America. When Stuart was six years old, his family moved to Newport, Rhode Island.

The house served as a private residence and during the 18th century, and the snuff mill and water wheel were lost. In 1930, the building was restored to its colonial state by Norman Isham and was opened to the public as a museum in 1931. Many of the house's original wooden walls and beams remained intact. It also retained its original four corner fireplaces, one in each room in the house. An English snuff mill built in the early 1730s was transported to the property during the restoration, and it is considered faithful in design to the original snuff mill. In addition, a new water wheel was built and attached to the side of the house, allowing the mill to operate by water power from Pausacaco Pond (aka Carr Pond). An original colonial-era gristmill was built in 1757 and owned by Benjamin Hammond, fitted with a water wheel. The mill remained inoperable until 2007, when the waterwheel was reconnected to the mill's operating gears.

The site was designated a National Historic Landmark in 1965 and was added to the National Register of Historic Places in 1966.

== Museum ==
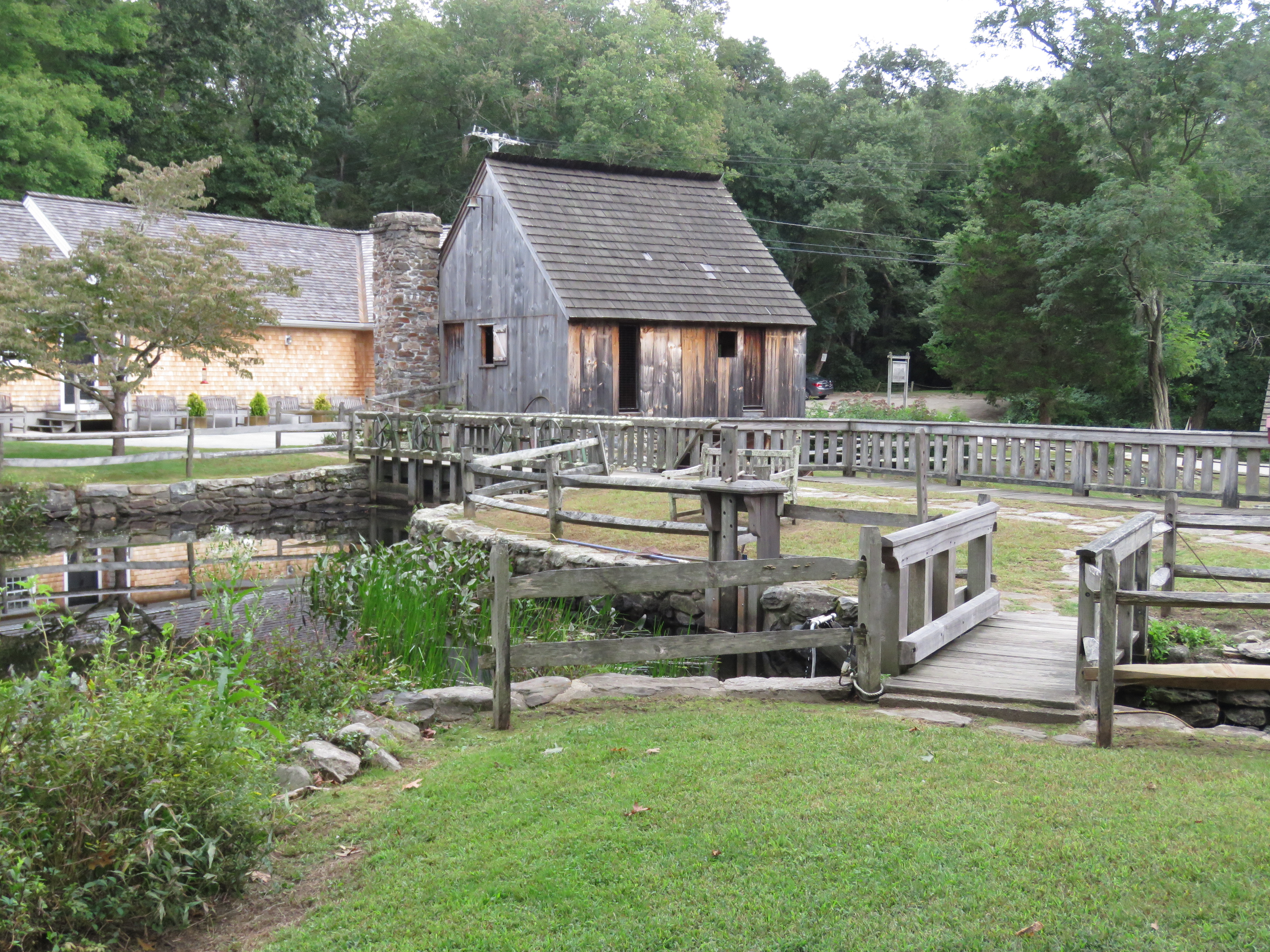
The c. 1662 grist mill located at the Gilbert Stuart Birthplace

The Gilbert Stuart Birthplace operates both docent-guided and self-guided tours of the birthplace and gristmill, and is open from May until mid-October. The house is furnished with original colonial furnishings in every room, though no piece of furniture is original to the house. Each room is also fitted with reproductions of Gilbert Stuart's most famous works, including the famous unfinished Athenaeum Portrait of George Washington (which is portrayed on the one-dollar bill), The Skater, Dr. Hunter's Spaniels, John Jay, and Catherine Brass Yates. Tours of the museum include the operation of the mills, explanation of the fish ladder, talks about the life and artwork of Gilbert Stuart, as well as some descriptions of the colonial furnishings and objects.

=== Junior docents ===
The Gilbert Stuart Birthplace used to operate a unique junior docent program, in which children and adolescents could volunteer to give interpretive tours of the museum dressed in colonial attire. The program was designed to teach children about history and the workings of a museum. The Junior docent program is no longer in operation.

== Grounds ==
The Gilbert Stuart Birthplace is located on twenty-three acres of property. The museum features nature trails, which bring tourists to the site of an old colonial burial ground, the Benjamin Hammond cemetery, a scenic overlook of Carr Pond, and the foundation of a colonial fulling mill. The grounds also feature an herb garden, a timber dam, and a boat dock, from which rowboats can be rented by museum members for use on nearby Carr Pond.

== Bell Art Gallery ==
Built in 2014, the museum's art gallery contains original works by Gilbert Stuart, and portraits of Gilbert by his daughter, Jane Stuart. In addition to the regular display of works by Gilbert Stuart, the gallery also displays work by other prominent Rhode Island artists. Past exhibitions have included Jane Stuart: Heir to Genius in 2016, Edward Mitchell Bannister: "My Greatest Successes Have Come Through Her", the artistic partnership of Edward and Christiana Bannister in 2018, Mabel May Woodward: Chasing the Summer's Day in 2022, and Soul of the Sitter: Contemporary Portraiture in Rhode Island in 2023.

== Images ==
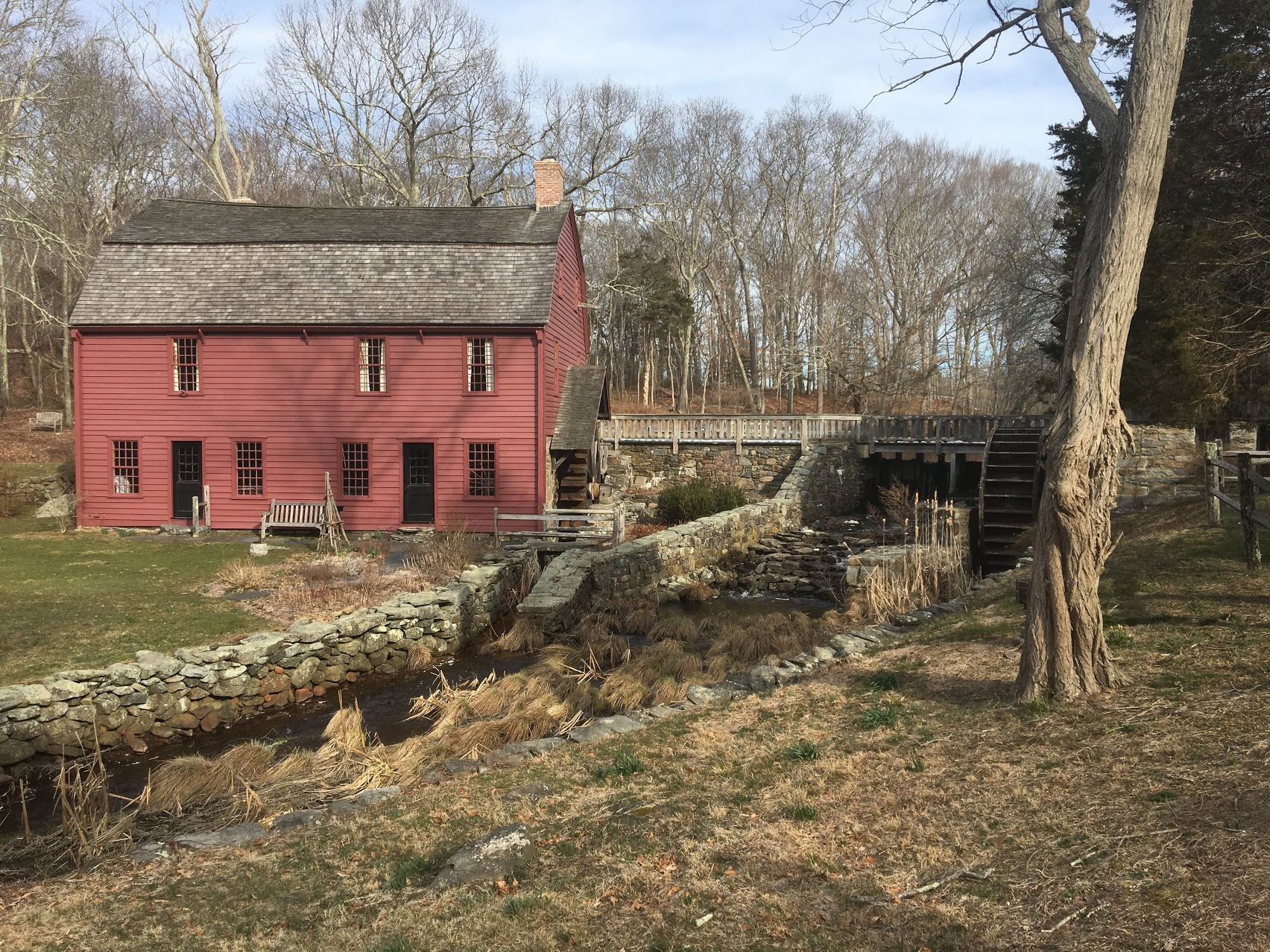
Gilbert Stuart Birthplace in March 2018

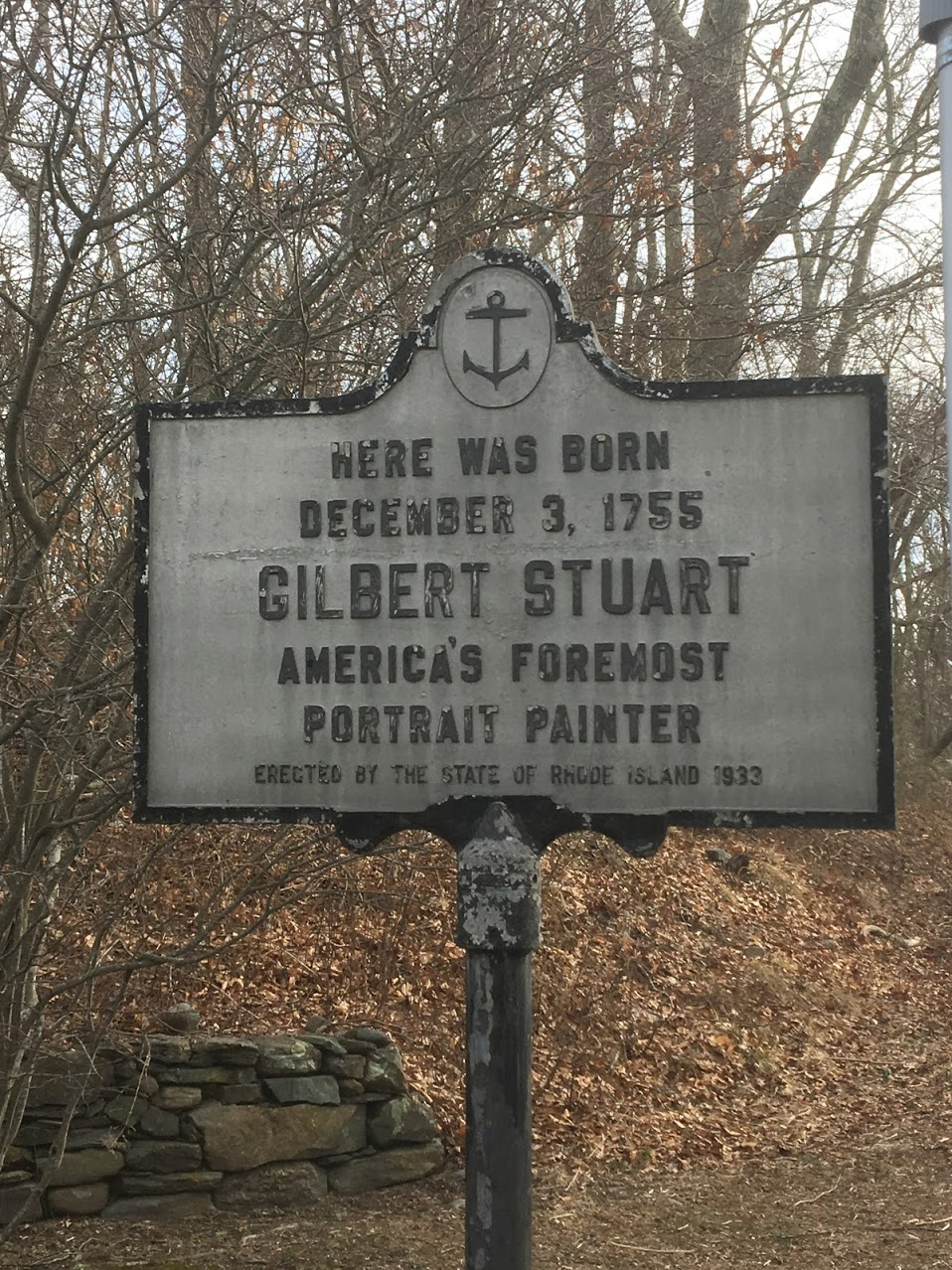
Birthplace sign

== See also ==
- Casey Farm
- Smith's Castle
- List of single-artist museums
- List of National Historic Landmarks in Rhode Island
- National Register of Historic Places listings in Washington County, Rhode Island
