= Ronald J. Onorato =

American art historian

Ronald J. Onorato is a Professor of Art History and Chair in the University of Rhode Island Art and Art History Department. His scholarship focusses on American architecture, public sculpture and funerary art with a special interest in the architectural heritage of Newport, Rhode Island from the colonial period to the present. He is chair of the National Register Review Board for Rhode Island and an honorary member of the American Institute of Architecture, Rhode Island Chapter. He has served as Co-Chair of the URI Center for the Humanities, on the Board of Directors, Newport Historical Society, as President of the Board, Pettaquamscutt Historical Society and is a trustee of the Newport Art Museum.

== Background and education ==
Onorato received his BA in Art History from Rutgers University, and his MA and PhD at Brown University. He has worked as senior curator at the La Jolla Museum of Contemporary Art in California and the New York Cultural Center in Manhattan.

== Publications ==
- 1974: "Providence Architecture, 1859-1908: Stone, Carpenter and Willson." Rhode Island History (August) Vol 33. Published by the Rhode Island Historical Society.
- 2004: Buildings of Rhode Island. Oxford University Press, New York. Contributing editor with William Mackenzie Woodward and William Jordy. ISBN 0195061470
- 2007: AIA Guide to Newport. American Institute of Architects, Providence. ISBN 097927270X.
- 2008: "Architecture and Drawing: The Newport Career of John Dixon Johnston." Newport History, 77:258,2.

== Fellowships, grants and awards ==
- 1976 Wyeth Foundation for American Art Publication Grant.
- 2011 URI Center for the Humanities Faculty Research Award for the project “George Champlin Mason Jr., the Colonial Revival and Preservation in American Architecture.”
- The Prince of Wales Institute of Architecture Fellowship.
- Principal Investigator, several projects for the National Endowment for the Arts.

== Notable affiliations ==
- Rhode Island Historic Preservation and Heritage, Commissioner.
- National Register of Historic Places Review Board, member.
- Rhode Island Historic Cemetery Commission, former member.
- Newport Historical Society, Former Board Officer.
- Newport Art Museum, Former Board Officer.
- The Pettaquamscutt Historical Society, Former Board Officer.
