= Rocky Hill School =

Rocky Hill Country Day School
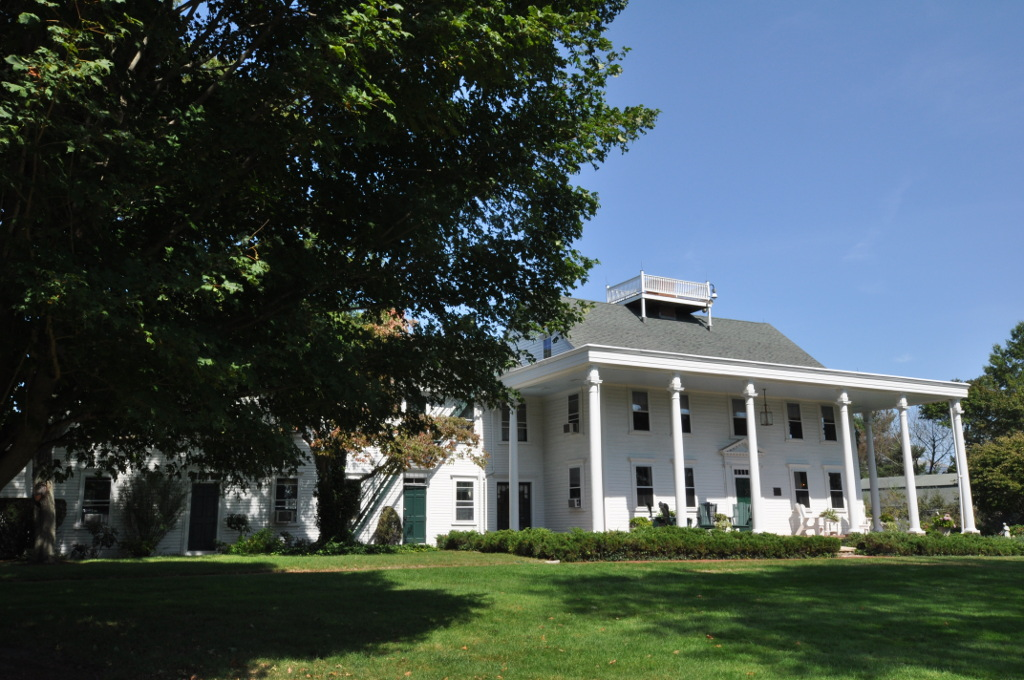

Location
- 530 Ives Road; Warwick, Kent County 02818; 41.658677°N 71.4226587°W

Information
- Founded: 1934

Rocky Hill Country Day School is an independent, coeducational, college preparatory day school located on 84 acres along the Potowomut River and Narragansett Bay in East Greenwich, Rhode Island. It educates in grades nursery through grade 12.

== History ==
Rocky Hill Country Day School (RHCD) was founded in 1934 as the Rocky Hill School for Boys by educators Dorothy Marshall and Esther Banfield Brown in Newport, Rhode Island. Originally established to offer a rigorous academic program rooted in moral character and leadership for young men, the school relocated in 1941 to the historic Hopelands estate in Potowomut, a peninsula in Warwick, Rhode Island, bordered by the towns of East Greenwich and North Kingstown. The new 84-acre waterfront campus along Narragansett Bay was once known as Potowomut Farm and holds deep historical significance, including ties to the Greene family and indigenous land use prior to European settlement.

In 1967, the school transitioned to a coeducational model, offering lower, middle, and upper school divisions. Over the decades, Rocky Hill has remained committed to academic excellence while evolving its programs to meet the needs of today’s learners. The campus is home to several historically significant buildings, including the original manor house and carriage house, which have been thoughtfully restored for academic and community use.

Research on the school’s history and its surrounding region has been compiled by Charles Laurent, RHCD Fifth Grade Teacher and Resident Historian. His work includes:

- Rocky Hill Country Day School History
- Hopelands & Potowomut History
- Land of Fires, Land of Hope, 1686–Present: Discovering The History of The Hopelands Estate: One of the last original Country Estates in Rhode Island

== Heads of School ==
Dorothy Knott Marshall - Headmistress - 1934 – 1941
Nathan Hale - Headmaster - 1941 – 1962
Robert Smith - Headmaster - 1962 – 1967
Hugh Campbell - Headmaster - 1967 – 1975
Alan Flynn Jr - Headmaster - 1975 – 1991
R. Leith Herrmann - Headmaster - 1991 – 1995
James Young - Headmaster - 1996 – 2013
Jonathan Schoenwald - Headmaster - 2011 – 2013
Peter Branch - Headmaster - 2013 – 2016
James Tracy - Headmaster - 2016 – 2018
Diane Rich - Head of School - 2018 – 2024
Dan Rocha - Interim Head of School - 2024 – 2025
Christine Heine - Head of School - 2025 – Present

== Facilities ==
- Perkins Hall
- Gibson Hall
- Sharpe Gymnasium
- Carriage House
- Hale Science Center
- Alan F. Flynn, Jr. Academic Center
- Hopelands
- Brickhouse
- Academic Center for Enrichment
- Marshall House (Preschool)
- Pony Barn
- Campbell Center
- Pump House
- Head of School residence

== Notable alumni ==
- Rudy Tanzi ’78
- Mena Suvari ’97
- Rome Kirby ’07
- Damian Rivera '21
