= Cannoneer =

Military specialty or rank in artillery

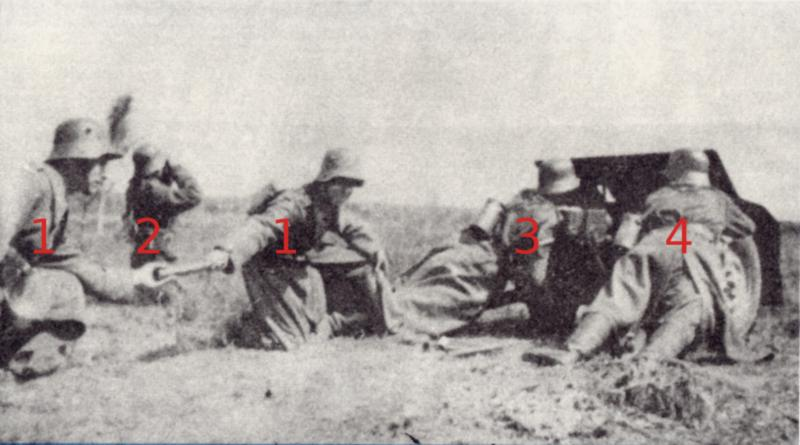
Gun crew of the Wehrmacht 37-mm-PaK, 1939 1 2 Cannoneers (fuse, ammunition a. charge) 2 Gunner (team leader) 3 Gun pointer (dep. gunner) 4 Loader

"Cannoneer" as a term for an artilleryman dates from the 16th century. As of 2016 the United States Army uses as titles for such a soldier: "13B" (thirteen bravo) M.O.S. (military occupational specialty code), a "cannon crewmember" or "cannoneer" for short. These "artillery-men" support infantry units in training, and on battlefields play an integral part in combat operations ranging from urban to jungle terrains.

An artillery private is known as a Kanonier in German, as a kanonier in historical Polish contexts, as a kanonnier in Dutch, and as a kanonir (Russian: канонир) in historical Russian army and navy contexts; today, these would likely be rendered in English as "cannon". It can also be utilized in airborne and air-assault missions.
