= Angela O'Leary =

19th–20th century Rhode Island painter

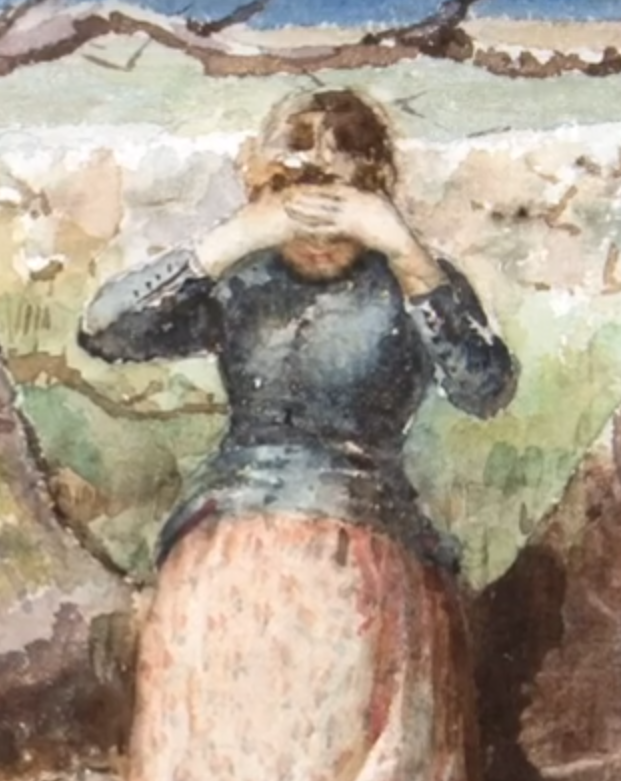
- Born: Katherine Angela O'Leary; October 29, 1877 or 1879; Providence, Rhode Island, U.S.
- Died: October 3, 1921 (aged 45); Providence, Rhode Island, U.S.
- Resting place: North Burial Ground
- Education: Sydney R. Burleigh, mentor
- Alma mater: Rhode Island School of Design
- Known for: Watercolor painting

Katherine Angela O'Leary (1877 or 1879 – 1921) was an American artist and artist's model. She was known for her watercolor paintings of landscapes and buildings, and exhibited widely across the United States. A former student of Sydney Richmond Burleigh at the Rhode Island School of Design, she died by suicide in his studio by gas poisoning at age 45. According to local folklore, O'Leary is said to haunt the Providence Art Club due to her tragic death.

== Biography ==
O'Leary was born in an illustrious family in Providence, Rhode Island. Her exact date of birth is unclear, as some sources report her birthdate to be in 1877 and others, 1879. She was one of three daughters born to surgeon Dr. Charles O'Leary and his wife Louise Dietrich O'Leary. In addition to her sisters Julia and Louise, Angela had three brothers, Arthur, Charles and Clement D. O'Leary. Her father was born in Ireland, attending Trinity College, Dublin and was originally a playwright. After emigrating to the United States, when the Civil War broke out, he managed a hospital in Portsmouth and later became one of Rhode Island's leading surgeons. Two of her brothers eventually became doctors. The family spent time between Providence and Emmetsburg, Maryland while O'Leary was growing up.

=== Art career ===
O'Leary studied at the Rhode Island School of Design. There, she took classes with Sydney Richmond Burleigh and became a member of the Providence Art Club and the Providence Watercolor Club. She additionally studied in the United Kingdom and Europe under "Dutch masters" to refine her impressionistic style.

After her art education, O'Leary remained in Providence and continued to develop her artwork. In Providence, she remained close to her mentor Burleigh, sitting for portraits and traveling widely with him and his family. In Providence, O'Leary maintained a studio at the Fleur-de-lys adjacent to Burleigh's.

The subjects of O'Leary's work were often close to home. Many of her works depict the local streets and buildings around Providence. O'Leary generally painted everyday life scenes, landscapes and genre scenes featuring buildings, in small formats. A 1916 exhibition, American Art News described her work: "Miss O'Leary shows about forty water colors of decorative quality in which quaint and dilapidated old buildings and tumble down rookeries are the motive and several studies of bridges." Another critic of her work in New England Magazine described her "poetic landscapes" having "remarkable color quality and great charm".

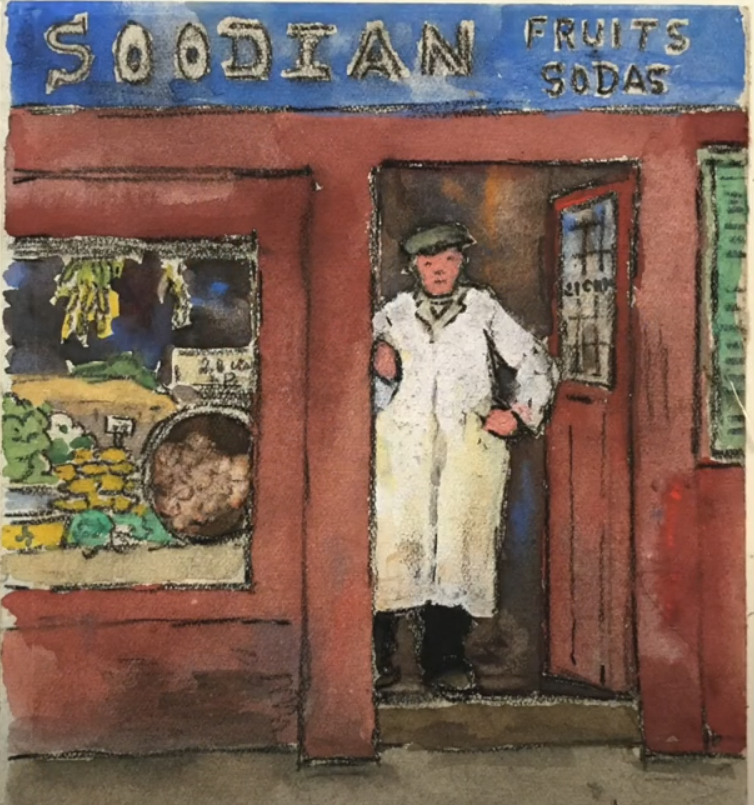
Detail of artwork by O'Leary depicting Providence street scene.

O'Leary exhibited her work frequently in Providence, and elsewhere in the United States. Her paintings featured in exhibitions in Chicago, Philadelphia, New York and beyond.

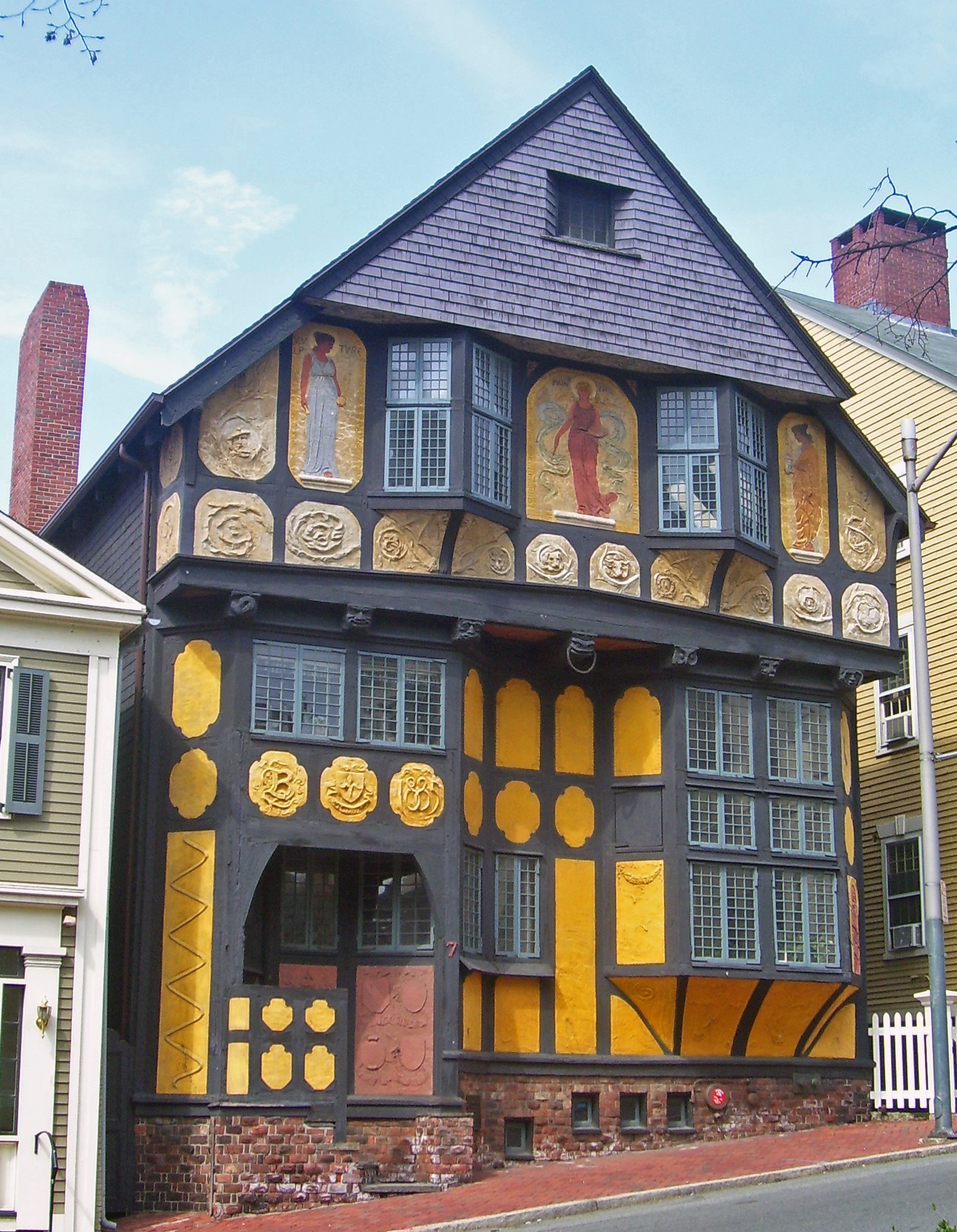
The Fleur-de-Lys Studios, the site of O'Leary's suicide attempt.

=== Death and legacy ===
On October 3, 1921, O'Leary died at Rhode Island Hospital as a result of gas poisoning. Two days earlier, she was discovered unconscious in her mentor Sydney Richmond Burleigh's art studio at the Fleur-de-lys Studios. She was found with "the tube of a gas jet in her mouth" and had attempted to commit suicide by inhaling gas. She is buried at Providence's North Burial Ground alongside her brother Arthur and sister in law Emma.

After her death, the Providence Art Club held a memorial exhibition in her honor, featuring 139 pictures. One of the featured artworks on display was a portrait of O'Leary painted in Paris in 1910 by Carl Johan Nordell, The Pink Scarf. The Pink Scarf won a silver medal at the Panama-Pacific International Exposition in San Francisco in 1915.

On the 100th anniversary of O'Leary's death, the Providence Art Club held a commemorative memorial presentation to celebrate her life. Today, the Art Club owns and displays O'Leary's portrait by Nordell, The Pink Scarf, as well as many of her artworks in their headquarters.

=== Haunting ===
According to local folklore and some members of the Providence Art Club, there is a legend that O'Leary's ghost haunts the Art Club and the Fleur-de-lys Studios on account of her tragic death.

Maxwell Mays, a painter who occupied Burleigh's former studio at the Providence Art Club, regularly told guests of his encounters with O'Leary's apparition.

Today, O'Leary's story and the Fleur-de-Lys studio feature on a number of "ghost tours" in Providence.

== Selected exhibitions ==
- "Windy Day". Pictures and Sculpture at the Brown Union, Lunch Room. Brown University. 1904–1905.
- 815. "A French Farm". 819. "In the Village". Ninth annual Philadelphia Water Color Exhibition, Pennsylvania Academy of the Fine Arts. November 13 to December 17, 1911.
- 76. "In Normandy". An Exhibition of Paintings and Drawings and Sculpture. City Art Museum St. Louis. February 4, 1912.
- "In Normandy". John Herron Art Institute, Indianapolis, Indiana. 1913.
- 78. "On the Highway". A Collection of water colors from the annual exhibition of the New York Water Color Club. Memorial Art Gallery, Rochester, New York, December 1914.
- 192. "A Little Court". 794. "Cabaret au Pont" Twelfth Annual Philadelphia Water Color Exhibition, Pennsylvania Academy of the Fine Arts. November 8 to December 13, 1914.
- 243. "Cabaret au pont" Twenty Seventh Annual Exhibition of Water Colors, Pastels and Miniatures by American Artists. The Art Institute of Chicago from May 13 to June 13, 1915.
- 435. "Skyscraper". Ninth annual exhibition of selected water colors by American artists, "The Rotary Exhibition" selected from the 48th annual exhibition of the American Water Color Society held in New York in 1915.
- Joint exhibition of works by Frederick Usher de Voll, Angela O’Leary, Hope Smith and Wm. H. Drury (March), Providence Art Club.
- 68. "A Sky-scraper". An Exhibition of water colors from the American Water Color Society assembled by the American Federation of Arts and a selected group of European and American paintings. Memorial Art Gallery, Rochester, New York, April 1916.
