= North Burial Ground =

American historic place in Rhode Island, built 1700

Coordinates: 41°50′34″N 71°24′29″W

- U.S. National Register of Historic Places
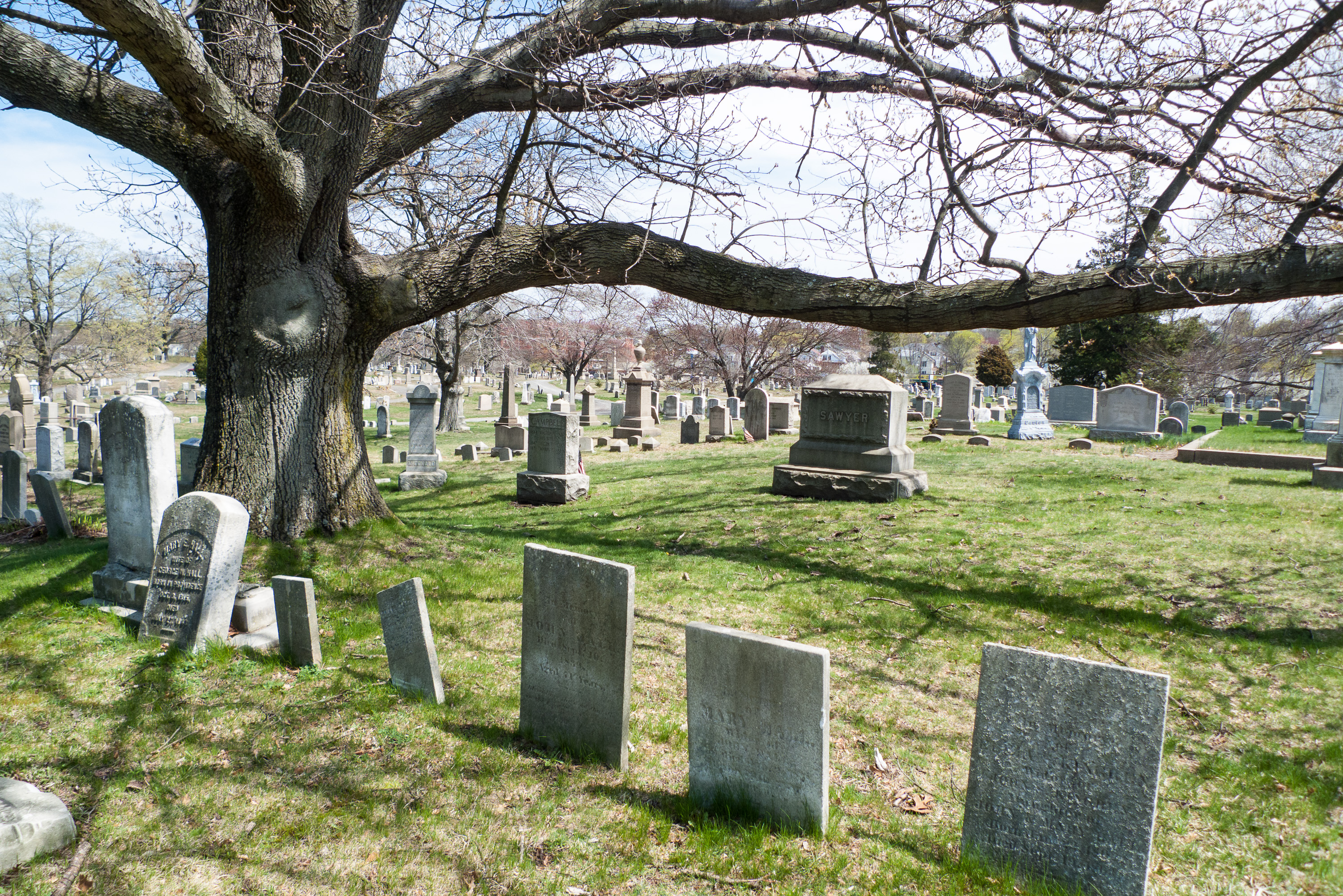

- Location within Rhode Island Location within the United States
- Location: Providence, Rhode Island
- Built: 1700
- NRHP reference No.: 77000003
- Added to NRHP: September 13, 1977

Mowry Tavern (now demolished), a stone-ender on Abbott St. as it looked ca. 1885, with the Cemetery behind it

The North Burial Ground is a 110-acre (0.45 km^{2}) cemetery in Providence, Rhode Island dating to 1700, the first public cemetery in Providence. It is located north of downtown Providence, bounded by North Main Street, Branch Avenue, the Moshassuck River, and Cemetery Street. Its main entrance is at the junction of Branch and North Main. The burial ground is one of the larger municipal cemeteries in Southern New England, and it accepts 220 to 225 burials per year.

== History ==
From the time of its founding by Roger Williams in 1636, Rhode Island had strict separation of religious and government institutions. Therefore, Providence had no state churches with adjacent public burial grounds, as most New England towns had. Instead, townspeople buried their dead in family plots on individual farms.

In 1700, a town vote was held to establish a municipal cemetery. This cemetery was to be open to the deceased of all faiths, from millionaires to paupers, and even emancipated slaves. 45 acres were set aside; 10 acres were to be used for a cemetery, the remainder for a town common and militia training ground. However, the first official burial didn't take place until one Samuel Whipple was buried here in 1710/11. There were only about one or two burials per year until 1736, when 14 people were buried.

By the mid-1800s, under the influence of the Rural Cemetery Movement, cemeteries generally became viewed as a place for the general public to enjoy refined outdoor recreation. In Providence, the North Burial Ground was further landscaped. More land was added, along with curving roads and trees, to make the grounds more attractive to the living.

== Notable interments ==
See also: Category:Burials at North Burying Ground (Providence)

North Burial Ground has the burials of many notable Rhode Island residents, including governors, members of Congress, soldiers, millionaires, emancipated slaves, and literary figures:

- Daniel Abbott, deputy governor of Rhode Island colony
- Philip Allen, Governor of Rhode Island and U.S. Senator
- Zachariah Allen, prominent Providence mill owner and civic leader
- William B. Avery, Medal of Honor recipient
- Edward Mitchell Bannister, Canadian African-American painter, educator
- Chad Brown, early pastor of the First Baptist Church in America, progenitor of Brown family
- John Brown, merchant, U.S. Representative, slave trader, co-founder of Brown University
- John Nicholas Brown II, socialite and philanthropist
- Nicholas Brown, Jr., philanthropist and namesake of Brown University
- Kady Brownell, Civil War veteran
- Tristam Burgess, U.S. representative
- Esek Hopkins, The only chief of the Continental Navy during the Revolutionary War
- Jonathan Chace, U.S. senator
- John Hopkins Clark, U.S. senator
- Nicholas Cooke, governor of colony and state of Rhode Island during American Revolutionary War
- Fred Corey, Major League Baseball player
- Charles Dow, journalist, co-founder of Dow Jones & Company and founder of The Wall Street Journal
- Samuel Eddy, U.S. representative and Chief Justice of the Rhode Island Supreme Court.
- Arthur Fenner, Governor of Rhode Island from 1790 to 1805.
- James Fenner, U.S. senator from 1805 to 1807, Rhode Island governor from 1807 to 1811, 1824 to 1831 and 1843 to 1845
- Sam Walter Foss, librarian, poet
- John Brown Francis, governor and U.S. senator
- William Goddard (U.S. patriot/publisher), American Revolutionary War printer
- Stephen Hopkins, colonial governor, founding father, signatory of the Declaration of Independence
- Jeremiah Brown Howell, U.S. senator
- Richard Jackson, U.S. representative
- Horace Mann, educator, U.S. representative, and first president of Antioch College
- James Manning, delegate to the Confederation Congress
- Albert Martin (soldier) (memorial), soldier, only Rhode Islander to have fought at the Battle of the Alamo.
- Charles J. Martin, artist and arts instructor
- James B. Mason, U.S. representative
- Peter Mawney, colonel of Providence militia
- Augustus S. Miller (1847–1905), Mayor of Providence 1903–1905.
- Angela O'Leary, American artist and ghost of Providence's Fleur-De-Lys Studios
- Annie Smith Peck, pioneering woman mountaineer
- Saunders Pitman, silversmith.
- Darius Sessions, deputy governor of Rhode Island colony
- James F. Simmons, U.S. senator
- Henry J. Steere, philanthropist and manufacturer
- Joseph L. Tillinghast, U.S. representative
- Sarah Helen Whitman, poet, essayist, and a romantic interest of Edgar Allan Poe

== Images ==
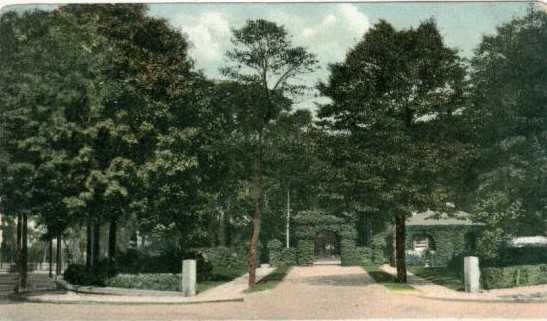
Early 1900s postcard of North Burial Ground

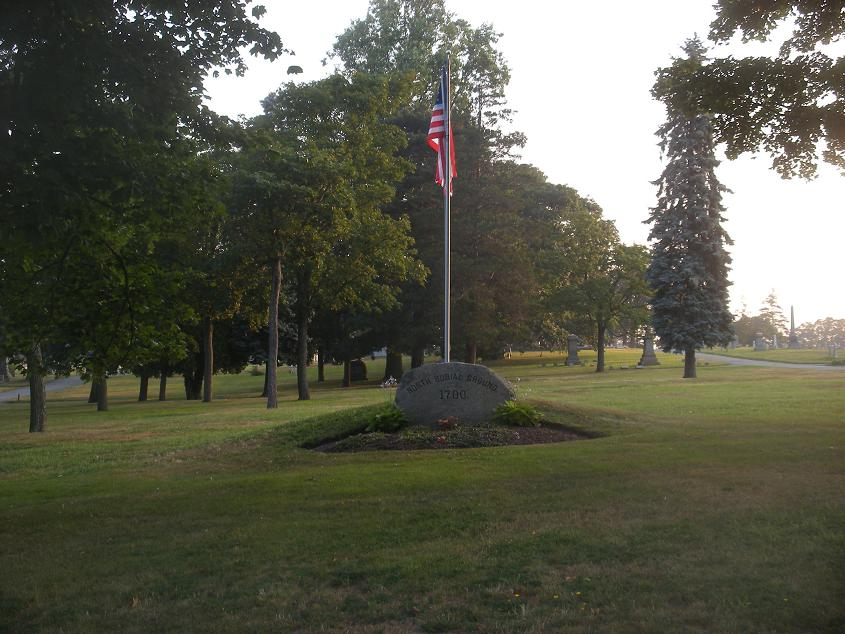
Entry flag and marker to North Burial Ground

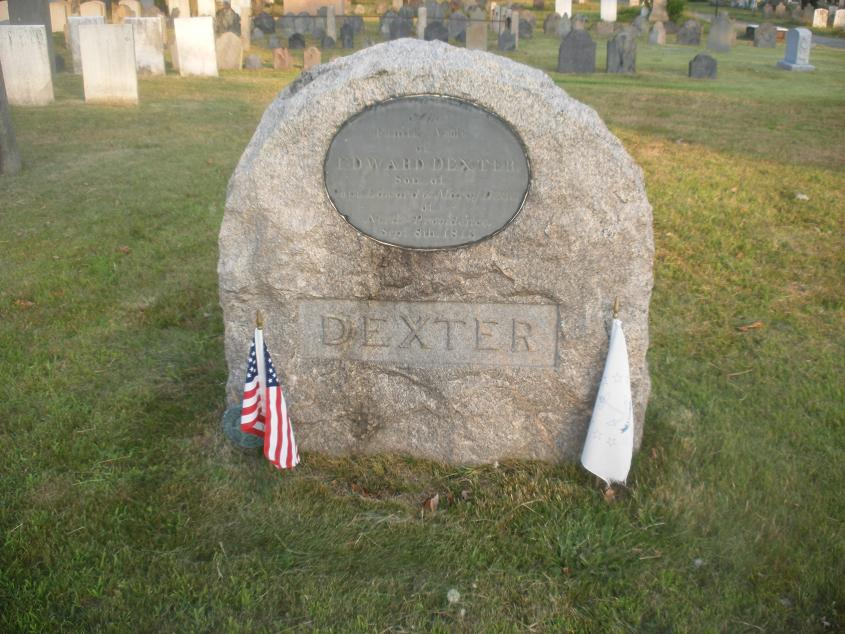
Dexter family monument with governor's flags for Gregory Dexter, colonial President

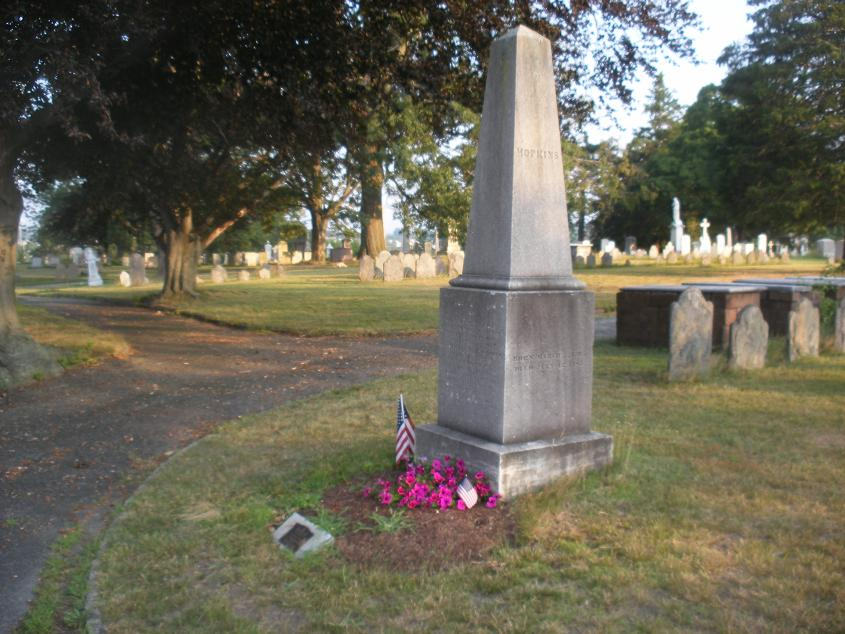
Grave monument for Governor Stephen Hopkins, signer of the Declaration of Independence

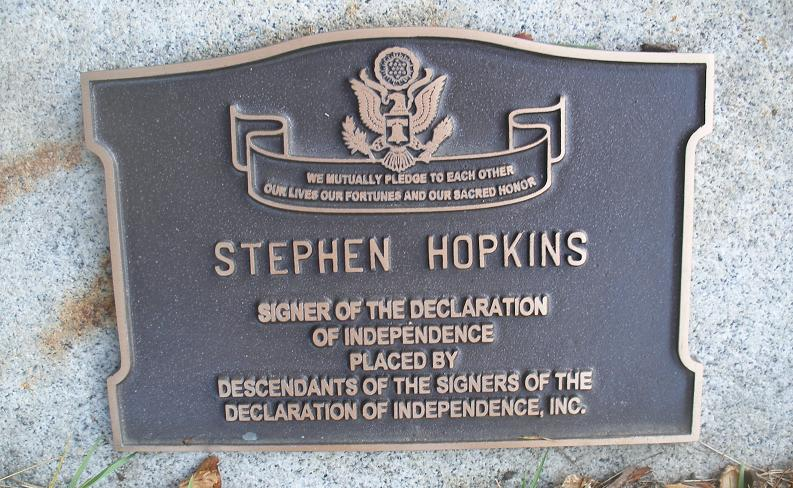
Grave plaque for Governor Stephen Hopkins

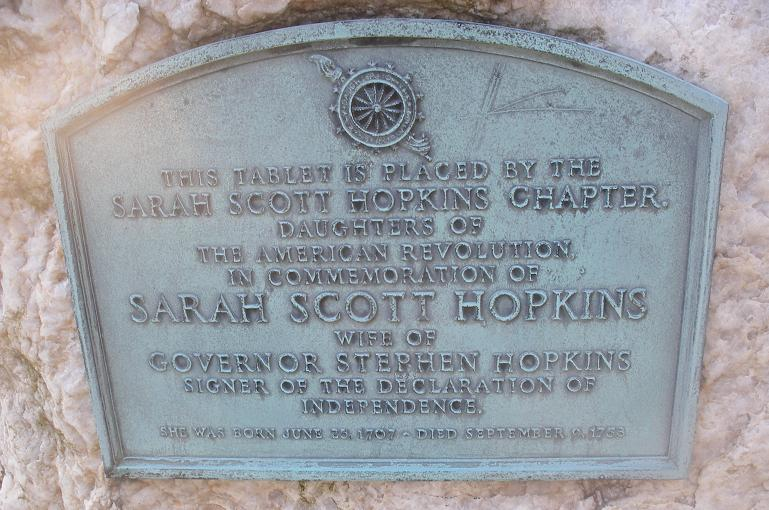
DAR grave plaque for Sarah Hopkins, wife of Governor Stephen Hopkins

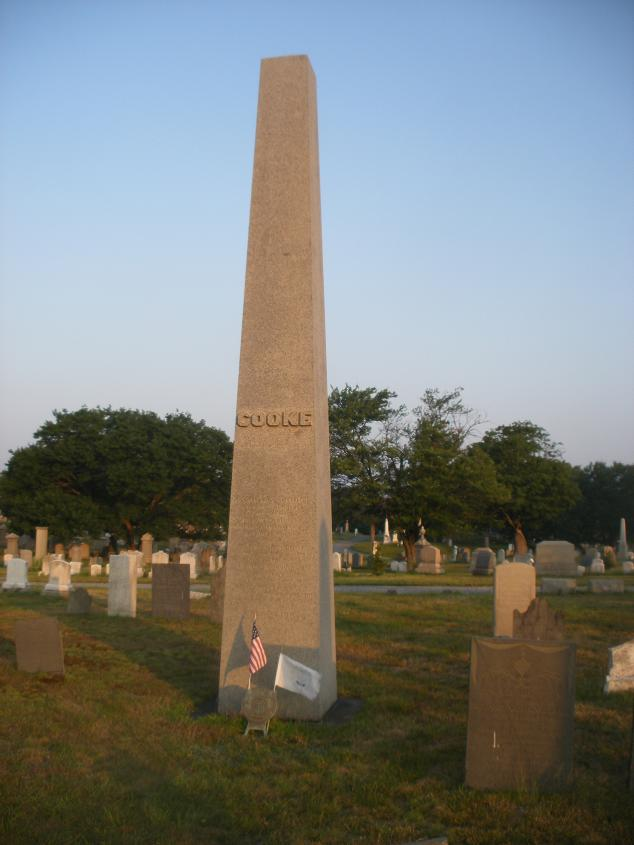
Governor Nicholas Cooke grave monument

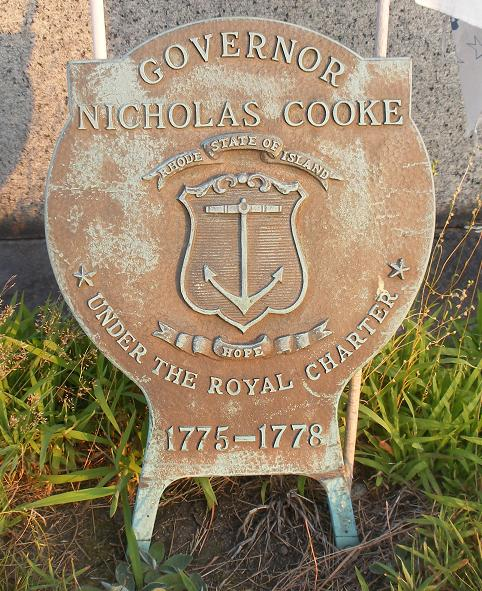
Nicholas Cooke governor's medallion

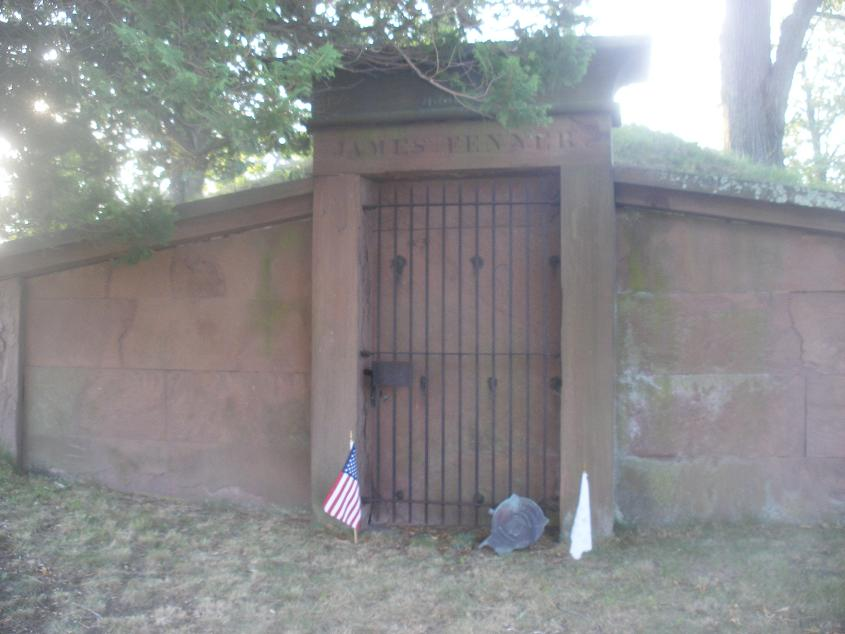
Governor James Fenner mausoleum

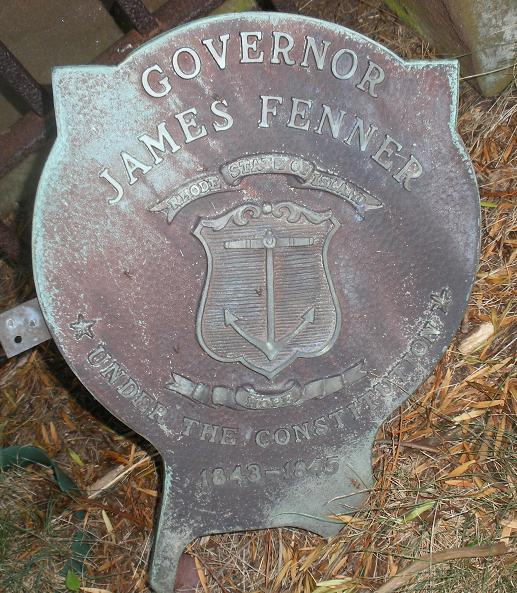
James Fenner governor's medallion

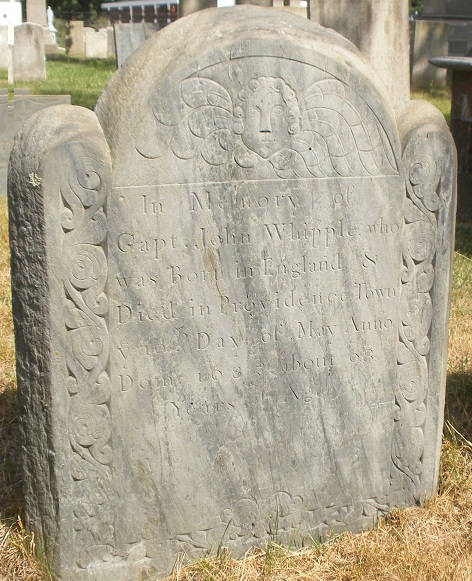
John Whipple, early Providence settler whose remains were moved here from a family plot

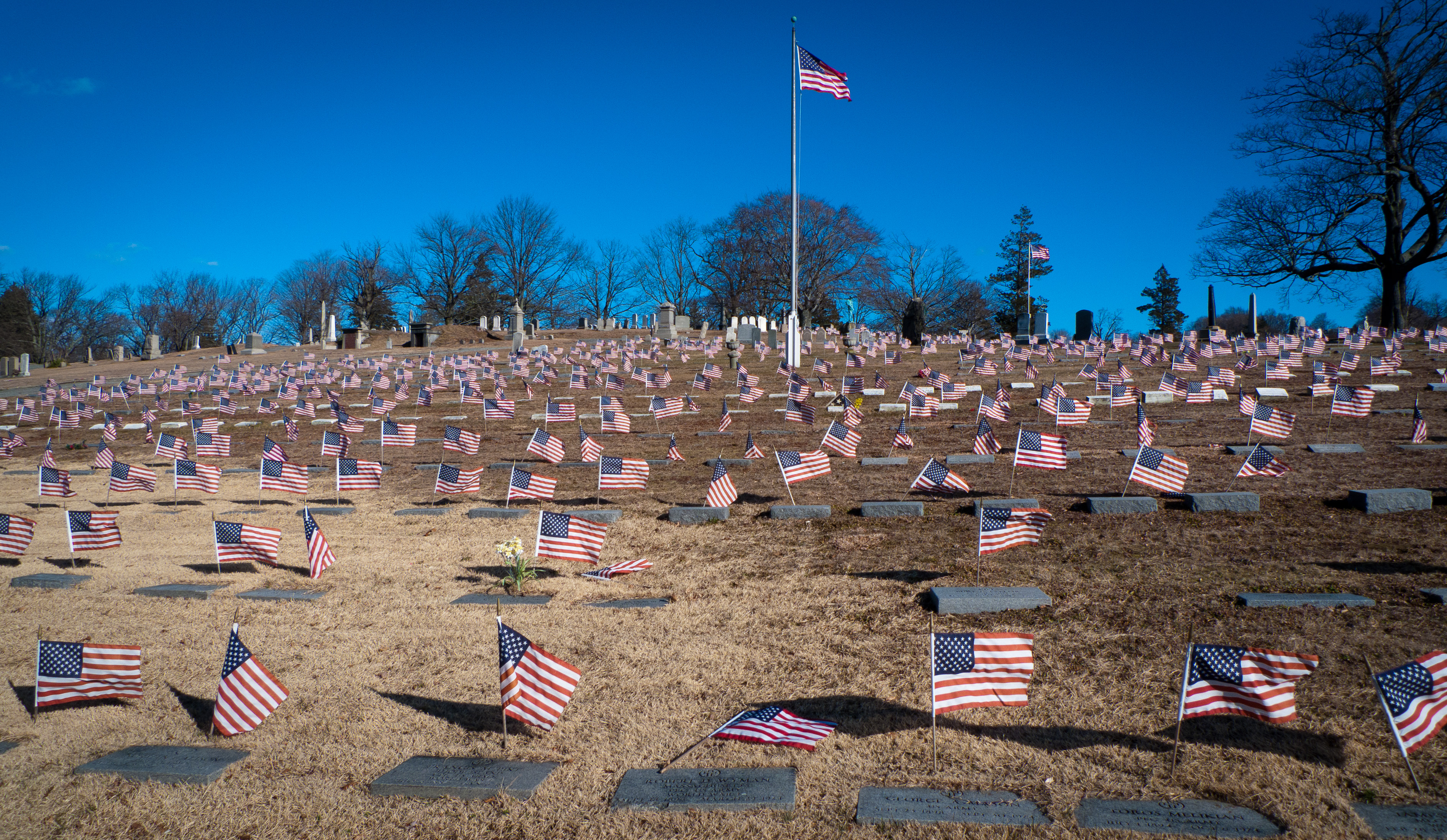
Flags fly over the graves of veterans at the North Burial Ground

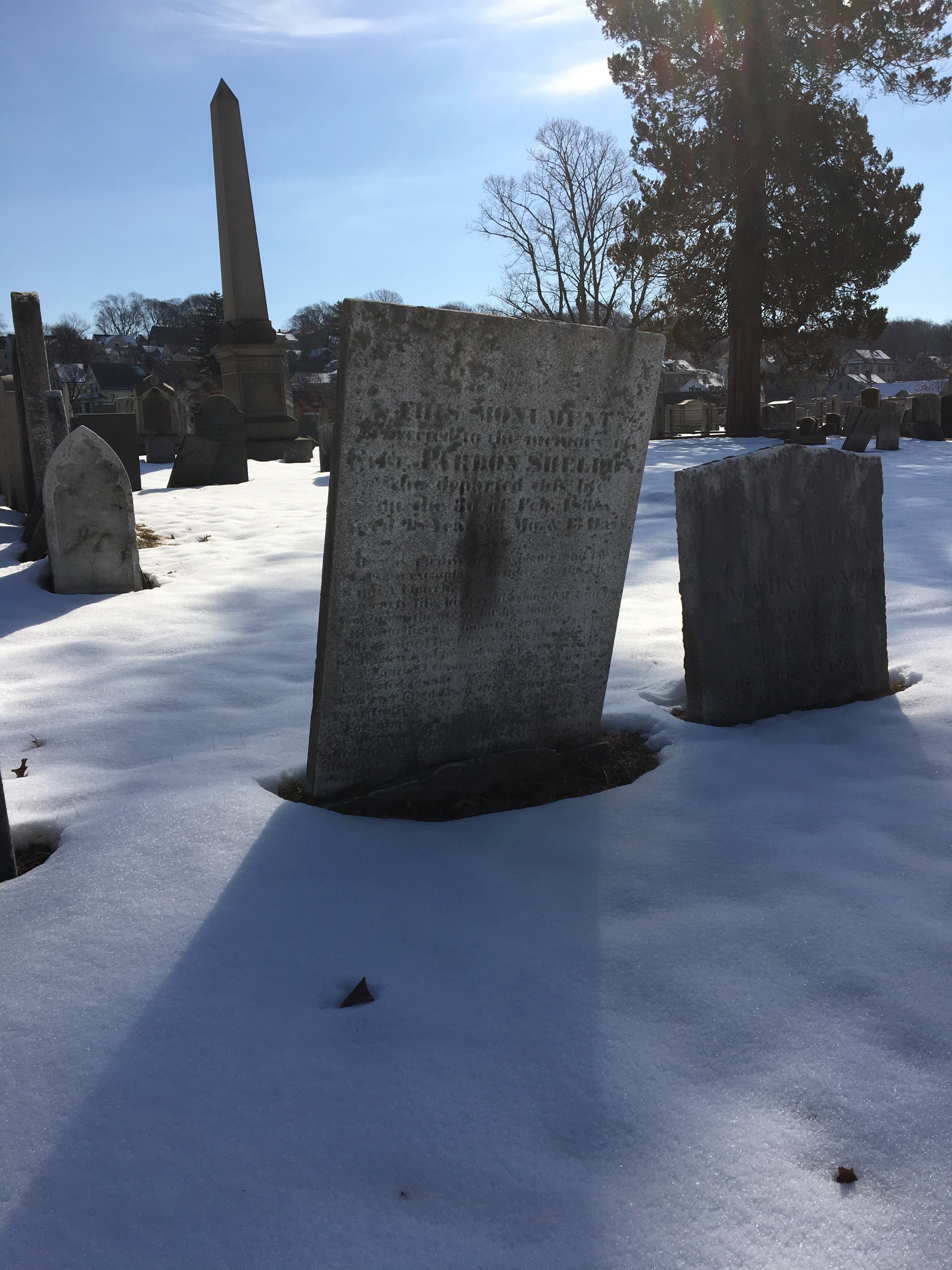
Grave of Capt. Pardon Sheldon, patriot involved in the Gaspee Affair

== See also ==
- National Register of Historic Places listings in Providence, Rhode Island
