= George William Whitaker =

American painter (1840–1916)

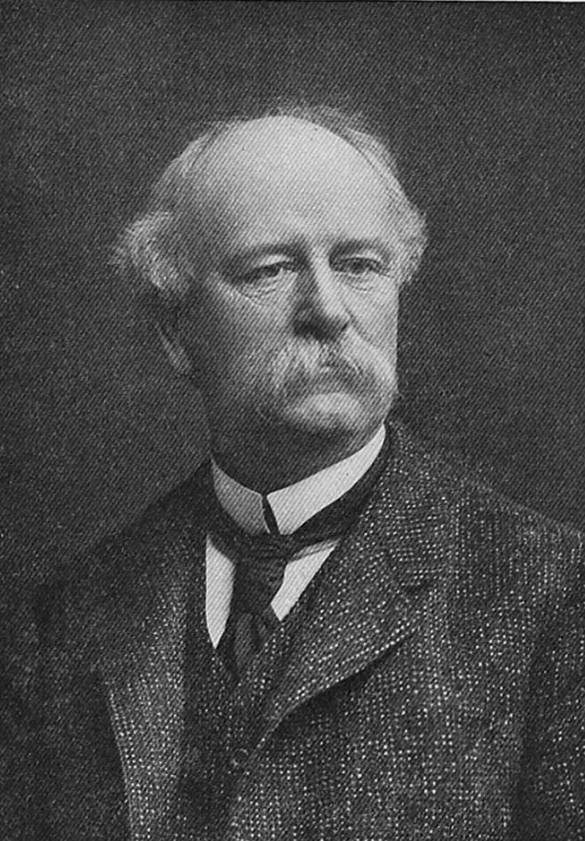
- Born: September 25, 1840; Fall River, Massachusetts
- Died: March 6, 1916 (aged 75); Providence, Rhode Island
- Education: Barbizon School
- Known for: Co-founder of the Providence Art Club
- Movement: Tonalism

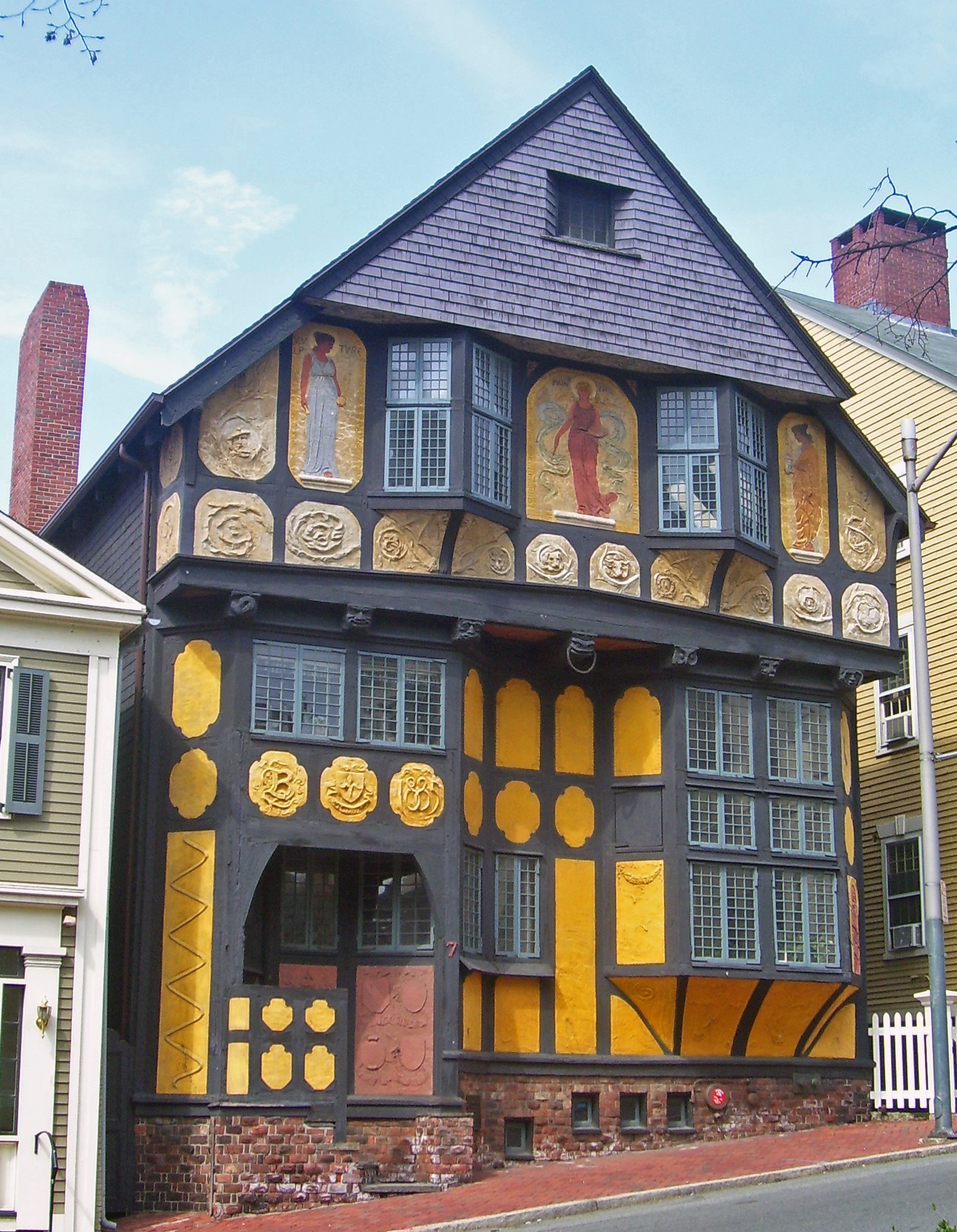
Fleur-de-Lys Studios, where Whitaker shared a studio with Burleigh

George William Whitaker (September 25, 1840 – March 6, 1916) was a prominent Rhode Island landscape painter during the late 19th and early 20th century, known as the "Dean of Providence painters" or the "Dean of Rhode Island Artists."

== Early life ==
Whitaker was born September 25, 1840, in Fall River, Massachusetts, to James and Elizabeth (Monday) Whitaker. George's father James was born in England and came to the United States as a child. Both George's parents died at a young age, leaving George an orphan at the age of two. George was raised by his maternal grandparents in Providence, Rhode Island.

George attended public schools in Providence, where his skills at drawing became evident. At age 14, George lived at the North American Phalanx, a transcendental community at Red Bank, New Jersey. There he studied with a painting instructor, Professor Guilledeau. The following year he apprenticed with his uncle Nathaniel Monday, an engraver in New York City. George Whitaker worked in New York as an engraver until he was 31 years old.

Whitaker married Sarah L. Hull, daughter of John and Lydia N. (Sherman) Hull, on May 27, 1863. They lived in the Fruit Hill section of North Providence, and were active in neighborhood improvement associations. They were members of the Church of the New Jerusalem on Trinity Square, in Providence. They had one daughter, Elizabeth Wood (Whitaker) Stiff.

== Career ==
During his time working for his uncle the engraver in New York City, Whitaker became interested in painting. He began studying with painters of the Hudson River School. Whitaker was mentored by landscape artists George Inness and Alexander Helwig Wyant. His attention then turned to Europe, and went to study with Hungarian painter László Paál in Paris. Whitaker was heavily influenced by Jean-François Millet and the Barbizon school in France. Whitaker's fondness for his art was such that he was quoted as saying he would "rather paint than eat."

=== The Providence art scene ===
Whitaker returned to settle in Providence in 1871, where he joined with Edward Mitchell Bannister and Charles Walter Stetson. He shared space with Sydney Burleigh in Burleigh's Fleur-de-lys Studios. Whitaker was also a regular attendee at the Sunday evening drawing-room gatherings held by Sarah Helen Whitman.

Whitaker is important for his influence in the Providence art community. He was active in supporting artists and art in Rhode Island. He wrote for the A.E. Society, a club for professional men which he organized. and actively offered art critique, even long after leaving the RISD faculty. In 1878, Whitaker was instrumental in founding the Providence Art Club. He was also a founder of the Providence Water Color Club.

Whitaker played a prominent role in the 1877 founding of the Rhode Island School of Design, and was its first instructor of oil painting.

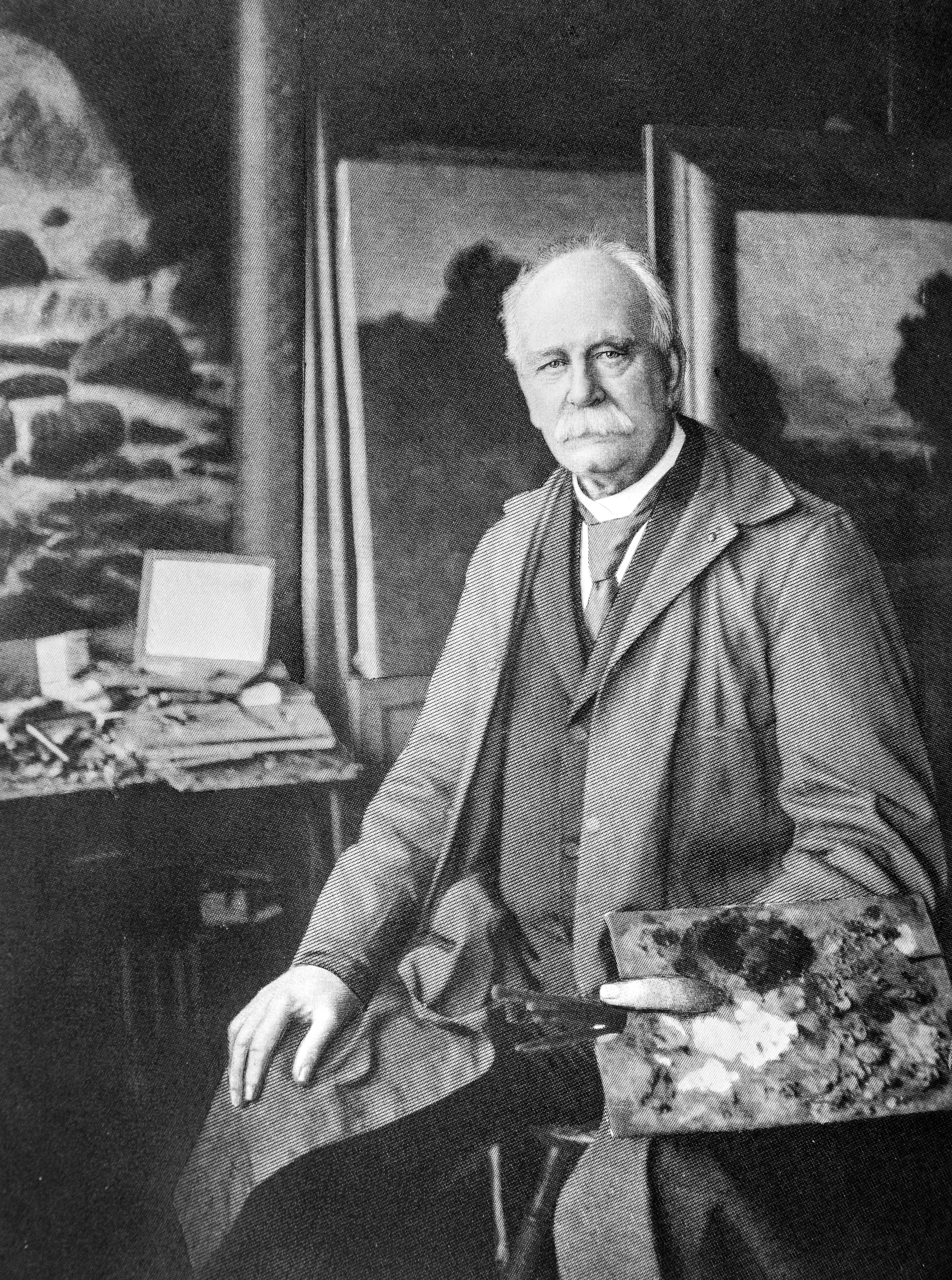
Portrait of the artist in later life

=== Works ===
Whitaker's typical canvas depicted a meadowland near a forest, with a roadway winding over a hill. The skies tend to have white fleecy cumulus clouds. In the middle distance is often a twisted old oak tree. It might feature a shepherd with a flock of sheep.

Whitaker was a devotee of the Barbizon School throughout his life. Rather than depict nature as a background, they elevated natural scenes to be the subject of the artwork, with an overall tone of colored atmosphere or mist. In later life, Whitaker was not a fan of the more modern art movements coming out of Europe; for example, he considered Futurism a detrimental fad.

In September 1887, Whitaker delivered a public lecture in which he recounted his search for the birthplace of fellow Rhode Island painter Gilbert Stuart.

=== Politics ===
Whitaker was an active Democrat, working to reform Providence's corrupt Republican party. He was a candidate for Senate several times, but never managed to achieve office. He volunteered on the local level for the Fruit Hill Volunteer Fire Department, and the Park Fund.

== Death and burial ==
Whitaker died March 6, 1916, in Providence. He is buried at Swan Point Cemetery.

== Influence and legacy ==
Whitaker exhibited at the National Academy in 1867 and 1869 and the Boston Art Club throughout the 1880s. His work is in the permanent collections at the Rhode Island School of Design Museum, Providence Art Club, Rhode Island Historical Society, and Kresge Art Museum at Michigan State University.

He was inducted into the Rhode Island Heritage Hall of Fame in 2011.

In 2019, the Gilbert Stuart Birthplace and Museum held a retrospective of Whitaker's work titled "The Mind’s Eye: The Art and Influence of George W. Whitaker."
