= Mangiacapra =

Mangiacapra is an Italian surname literally translating to 'goat-eater'. Notable people with the surname include:

- Alessandra Mangiacapra (born 1999), Italian karateka
- Paola Mangiacapra (born 1939), American watercolorist
