= Providence Art Club =

Art club in Providence, Rhode Island

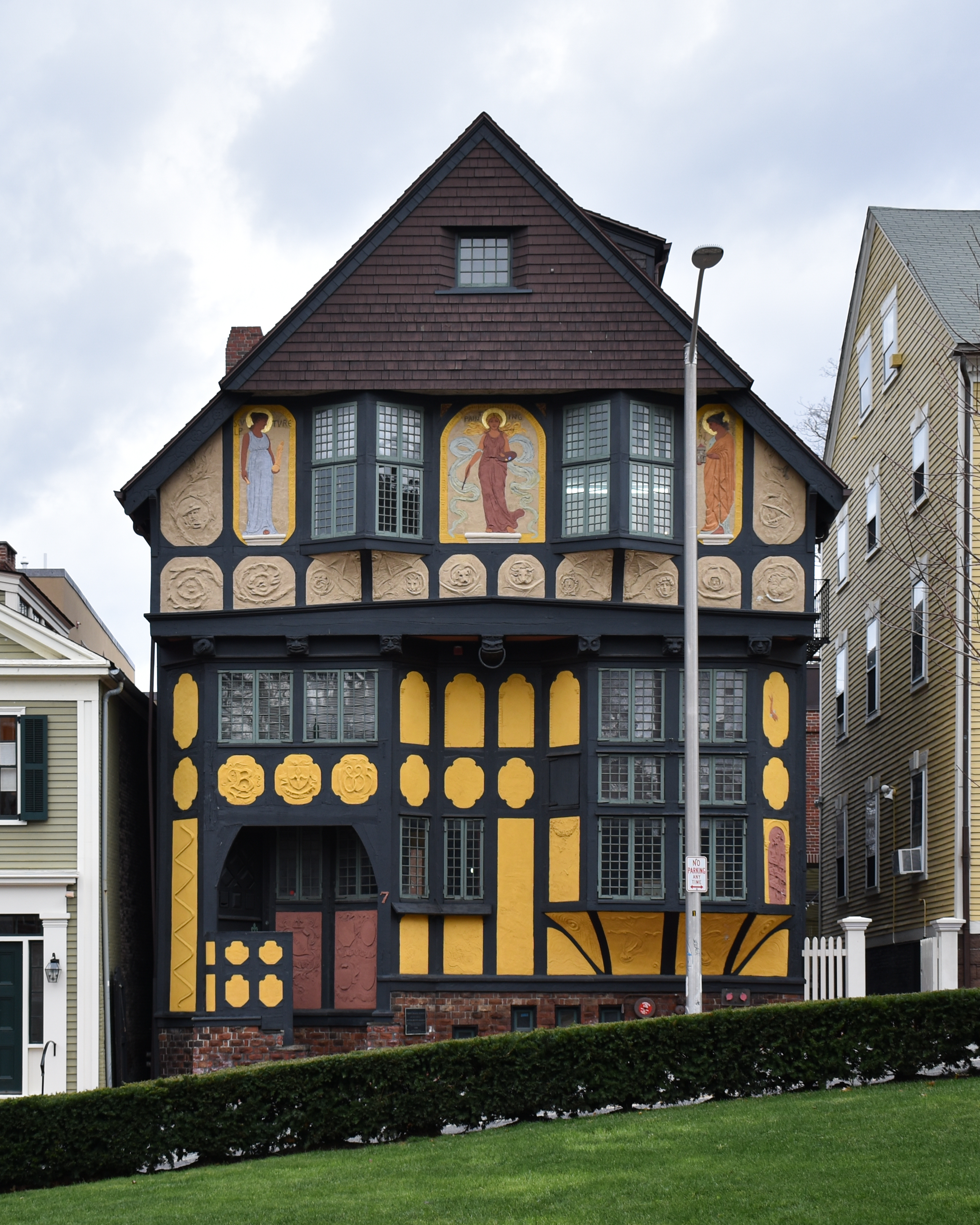
Fleur-de-Lys Studios

The Providence Art Club, Thomas Street, Providence, Rhode Island, was founded in 1880. An art club is an organization for artists and the community to engage and collaborate with each other in a shared space dedicated to art and culture. The Providence Art Club has studios, galleries, eateries, and a clubhouse in a "picturesque procession of historic houses," which are across the street from the First Baptist Church in America.[1] The buildings occupied by the Providence Art Club include Brick House, the two Seril Dodge Houses at 10 and 11 Thomas Street, Deacon Taylor House, and Fleur De Lys Studio.

== History ==
The Providence Art Club, founded on February 19, 1880, is the third oldest continually operating art club in America, after the Philadelphia Sketch Club and New York's Salmagundi Club. It was the first art club in the United States to admit women as members.

The Brown brothers (benefactors and namesakes of Brown University), Nicholas, Joseph, John, and Moses, helped construct the buildings now used by the Providence Art Club. These buildings have served as the foundation for many renovations that have been implemented since the 1800s.

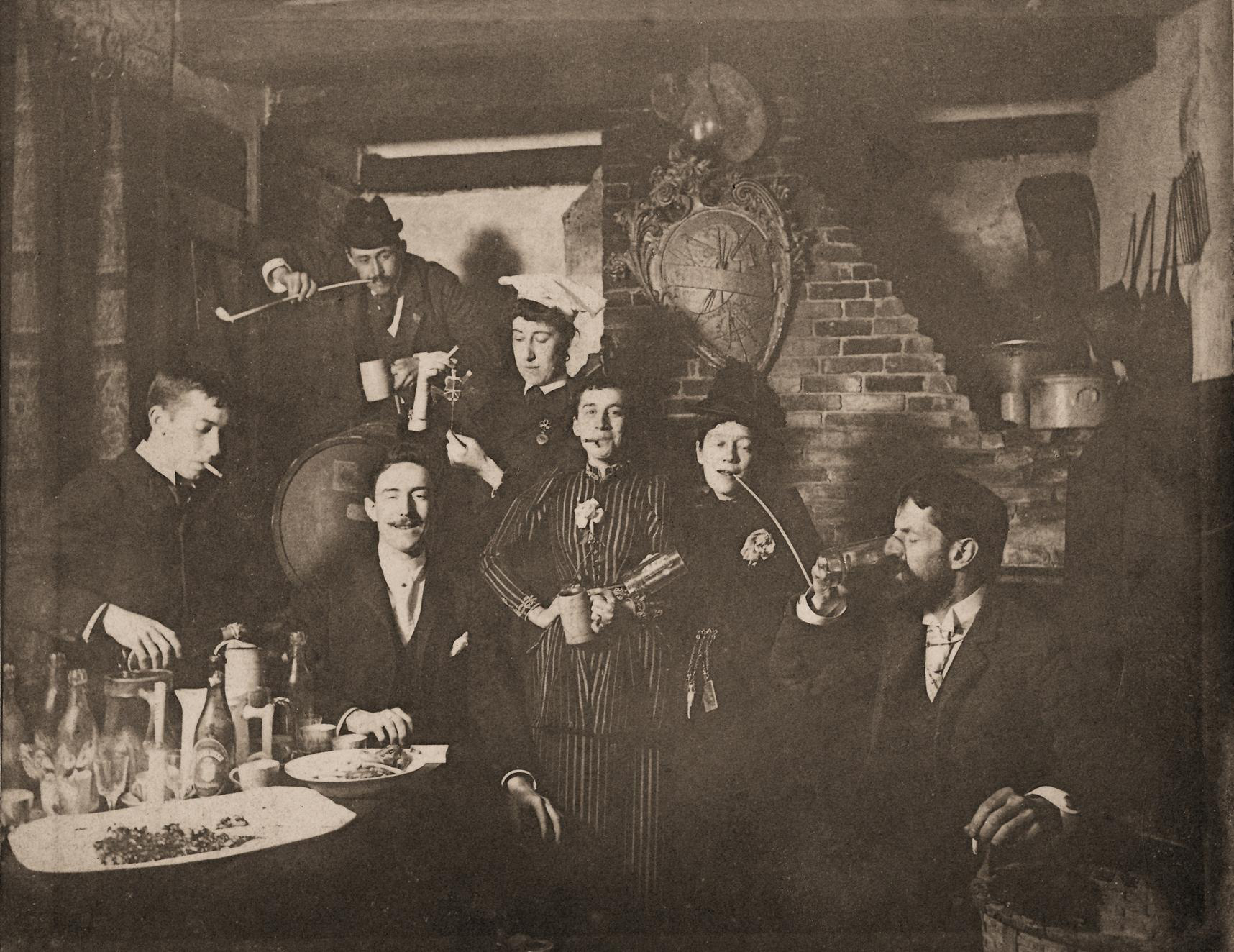
Early Providence Art Club members, circa 1890. Sydney Burleigh sits at right.

At the inception of the club, Providence was a flourishing industrial and port city which allowed the city to invest in cultural endeavors, like art. Painting and sculpture was developed as past-times by the mill owners and manufacturers of the day. The market for painting was first for portraiture to meet the demand by many wealthy patrons.

As the artistic community expanded in Providence, scattered groups of artists opened studios primarily around the town center. Some of these artists had a professional positions at private art schools and some gave more informal lessons in their studios.

After many years of discussion the difficulty of displaying their works, a small group of artists including Edward Mitchell Bannister, Charles Walter Stetson, Sydney Burleigh, George William Whitaker, and Rosa Peckham came together to form the Club. At their first meeting, they created a committee to draft the first constitution, chose temporary officers, and debated the space they would occupy. They also created a compact which is preserved, to this day, in the Club's safe.

The first president of the Art Club was the locally prominent portrait artist James Sullivan Lincoln. The club's first woman president was Mabel May Woodward.

Not much is known about founding member Rosa Peckham; she studied with William Rimmer in New York and Jules Joseph Lefebvre in Paris. She was among the first 30 American women to have her artwork exhibited at the Paris Salon. It is Rosa Peckham's notes, from while she was serving as secretary, that provide a detailed history of the inception of the Club. However, Peckham was only secretary for the first year of the Club and thereafter served briefly as Vice President and remained a member of the Club for most of her life.

The first exhibition at the Club was on May 11, 1880 and was considered a critical success with favorable reviews in a series of nine long articles in the Providence Journal. Within a year after the creation of the Club, it had attracted over two hundred members and had found a suitable gallery space, though it continually underwent expansion and renovation, especially in its first decade of existence. The Club quickly became a space for socializing as members played music, had lively conversations, and heard lectures about culture.

In 1886, the club purchased the former Seril Dodge House at 11 Thomas Street, built in 1791, to be its headquarters and gallery space. Around the turn of the 20th century, the club also purchased the 1786 Seril Dodge House next door at 10 Thomas Street. The building was raised one story above street level and a Colonial Revival storefront was added to sell art supplies. The building is now used for storage and additional gallery space, and the original first floor has been restored.

After 1888, there was no admission charged to the general public to view the exhibitions. As time went on, the expenses for the exhibitions began to be paid out of the general Club fund and the gallery was opened all year long. In 1945, the Club revised its policy about taking a ten percent commission from the sale of artists' work and since then the artists have kept all revenue from the sales of their work. The Club insures exhibits of artists' work against fire and theft.

== Women artists ==
The Providence Art Club was the first American art club to insure full and equal membership to women in its original charter. On February 19, 1880, six women signed the Club's original compact: Katherine H. Austin, Etta Belcher, Harriet R. Chace, Lottie F. Dailey, Rosa F. Peckham, and Eleanor W. Talbot. Their inclusion as equal members to their male counterparts in the club was "unheard of in 1880." A week after the signing, the group again met, at the home of Lottie Dailey, to adopt a constitution characterized by gender-neutral language. Three weeks after this, the group held a public gathering in the "Ladies Studio" to inaugurate the club and recruit new members. They recruited 112 members, including 48 women.

These founding women and other early members of the Providence Art Club worked professionally as artists and educators, each with studios in Providence where they made their art, gave lessons to others, and held yearly exhibits. Despite the societal barriers that being a woman in the male-dominated art world presented, many of these women made a name for themselves in the profession, even achieving economic independence through selling their work.

As a result of their success, these female artists challenged the "discriminatory myths of their time," namely that women making art was always simply a hobby, never a profession. They created a culture within which women could be empowered to challenge traditional gender stereotypes.

The women of the Club used the Ladies' Board to integrate themselves into the daily functions of the club in a manner that was separate and distinct from the men, though sometimes admittedly unequal. If elected to the board, in their first year they handled receptions for openings, the sale of the works on display, and general overview of the workings of the club. In their second year, members would work on an independent project and in their third and final year they would serve as an officer. Ex-members would often continue to serve on Club committees. In the early 1990s, the autonomy of the Ladies' Board was dissolved as their responsibilities were diffused among all members of the Club and they were no longer excluded from traditional men's activities.

== Rhode Island School of Design ==
From the Providence Art Club's founding in 1880, most members viewed the Rhode Island School of Design (RISD) and the Providence Art Club as having a symbiotic relationship. The Providence Art Club rented offices from the Rhode Island Society for the Encouragement of Domestic Industry, just down the hall from RISD, and used RISD spaces for its first exhibit. Many Providence artists were involved with both RISD and the Providence Art Club. Sarah Doyle, Clifton Hall, and William Weeden, all RISD trustees, were early and active members of the Providence Art Club. George Whitaker, an artist at the Providence Art Club, was the first teacher of oil painting at RISD and George Porter, the head teacher at RISD, was a founding Providence Art Club member.

However, from the start the artists of Rhode Island believed that keeping the Rhode Island School of Design and the Providence Art Club separate was extremely important. George Porter submitted an early proposition to have the Providence Art Club rent rooms from RISD and institute dual membership between the two institutions, but this was voted down. It was artist John Nelson Arnold who most strongly argued for the independence of the Providence Art Club. He believed that it was paramount that the Providence Art Club have its own space in order to avoid the risk of being overshadowed and enveloped by RISD.

Each institution took up compatible but distinct roles. RISD served as a training ground for artists, teaching art skills with an emphasis on employment. The Providence Art Club served as a space for the exhibition of professional artists, currying favor from art collectors and buyers. Both institutions, endorsed by Providence's wealthy social class, invigorated the art community.

== Today ==
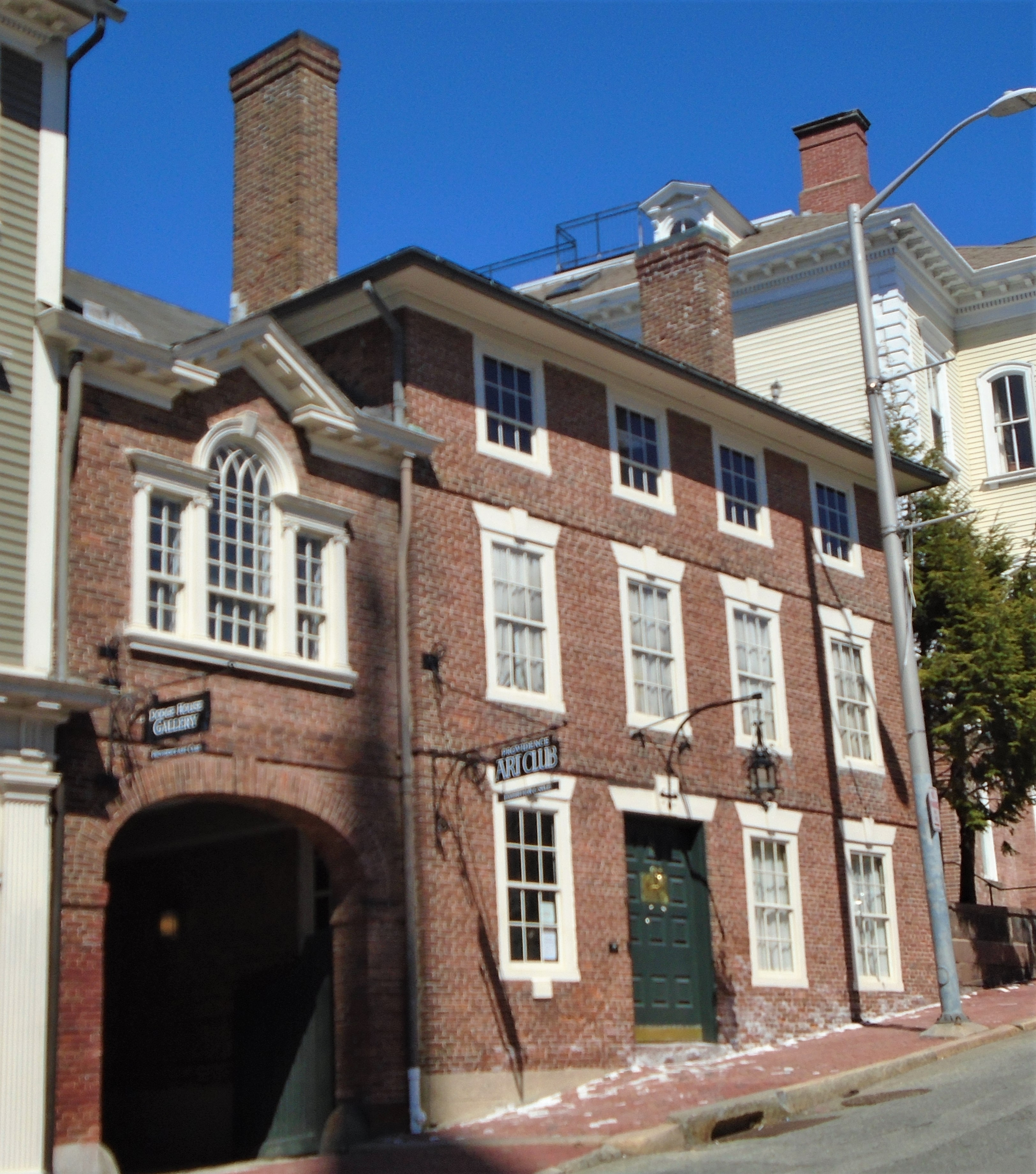
The former Seril Dodge House at 11 Thomas Street has been the club's headquarters since 1887

=== Tax status ===
The Club has a tax-exempt 501(c)(3) status that enables it to maintain its financial well-being. Their Endowment Fund, a repository of all non-designated gifts, provides annual dividends to cover the club's operating expenses as member dues do not fully cover these costs.

=== Organization ===
The Club is still largely overseen by the President although in the 1990s adopted a position for a professional manager to oversee the daily functions of the Club so that the President could be freed up from these administrative tasks. An Executive Committee meets once a week to discuss issues relevant to the function of the Club and the entire Board meets each month, on the second Thursday, to further continue these conversations which is followed by a dinner.

=== Exhibitions ===
The Club's collection comprises more than 500 works ranging from paintings to pieces of furniture. "Picture of the Month" is an exhibit over the fireplace in the Club's reading room that changes each month and the pieces are selected from either the Club's collection, a member's private collection, or a recent purchase. Exhibits are held every two to three weeks and usually consist of the works of three to four artists, two to three displaying in the Mays and Moite gallery and the other in the Dodge House gallery. Artist members of the Club can exhibit every two to three years. Each year an Artists' Forum is hosted with the subject being of interest to the artist members of the Club. More often, there are Artists' Nights that include demonstrations, lectures, and workshops relevant to the interests of members.

=== Library and archive ===
When the Art Club began, Providence did not have many institutions dedicated to the collection and curation of books and periodicals on art. The Club decided to subscribe to a variety of these publications and the library committee collected and bound these materials. In 1963, the decision was made to donate many of these bound volumes to RISD and Roger Williams College to clear space for a new display case. At present, the Club is dedicated to curating a fine arts library which includes the works of members. There is a digital repository of these resources and a monthly newsletter sent out by the librarian to members about the resources available to them in the library. In 1969, a member of the Art Club named Marge Dalenius organized all of the records of the Club that had previously been scattered in scrapbooks and other repositories around the Club. In 1993, the Club gained an official archivist to ensure the longevity of the documents detailing the Club's history which have since been transferred to a digital repository.

=== Membership ===
The Providence Art Club welcomes new members who are interested in art and culture. After being accepted, members get to attend monthly social events, including dinners, artist panel discussions, lectures, art lessons, and music programs. The Club also has a culinary program, with multiple dining rooms each providing a unique dining experience. Lunch is served Monday through Friday in the Café and is extremely popular among members. The Café also hosts dinners on Saturday nights and special brunches and receptions. Members can also host private events for up to 300 members.

There are three levels of membership. Patron members enjoy all of these benefits, but can not exhibit their work. Arts Professional Members, who must submit a selection of their artwork in order to qualify, benefit from the status of Professional Member, but also cannot exhibit work. Finally, Exhibiting Artist Members, who submit a portfolio which is then voted on by the Arts Qualification Committee, are able to exhibit and sell their work in the Providence Art Club Galleries.

If the Providence Art Club is closed, members are allowed reciprocal privileges from other clubs in the area, including the Brown Faculty Club, the Agawam Hunt, the Hope Club, the Rhode Island Country Club, and the Squantum Association. The Providence Art Club has also recently formed relationships with the Arts Club of Washington, Circolo della Caccia in Bologna, Italy, the Franklin Inn Club of Philadelphia, the National Arts Club, the Salmagundi Club of Manhattan, and the St. Botolph Club of Boston.

== Notable members ==
- Edward Mitchell Bannister
- Angela O'Leary
- Sydney R. Burleigh
- Mabel May Woodward
- Jane R. Hammond
- Helen Watson Phelps
- Sarah J. Eddy
- Mary C. Wheeler
