= Paola Mangiacapra =

American watercolorist (born 1939)

Paola Mangiacapra (born 1939) is a watercolorist working and living in West Kingston, Rhode Island. Mangiacapra grew up in Tarrytown, New York, the daughter of Italian immigrants. Mangiacapra attended Bates College and graduated in 1961 with a bachelor's degree in chemistry. Mangiacapra's career and study in watercolor began in 1993, and she was mentored by Nancy Gaucher-Thomas.

Mangiacapra's style has been described as "at once painterly and precise." Her work has been displayed at the Wickford Art Festival, Newport Art Museum, National Arts Club, the Salmagundi Club, the Kent Art Association, Catharine Lorillard Wolfe Art Club and the Rhode Island Watercolor Society. She holds signature artist memberships in the Northeast Watercolor Society, the Catharine Lorillard Wolfe Art Club, the Rhode Island Watercolor Society, and the Spring Bull Gallery, Newport, RI.
