= William B. Avery =

- Born: September 10, 1840; Providence, Rhode Island
- Died: July 19, 1893 (aged 52); Warwick, Rhode Island
- Burial place: North Burial Ground, Providence, Rhode Island
- Military career
- Allegiance: United States of America
- Branch: United States Army; Union Army
- Service years: 1861 – 1863
- Rank: Captain
- Units: Company B, 1st New York Marine Artillery
- Conflicts: American Civil War
- Awards: Medal of Honor

William Bailey Avery (September 10, 1840 – July 19, 1894) was a Union Army officer who received the Medal of Honor for valor during the American Civil War.

== Biography ==
At the outbreak of the American Civil War, Avery volunteered to serve in the Union Army as a private in Company A of the 1st Rhode Island Detached Militia (a.k.a. 1st Rhode Island Volunteer Infantry). He served at the First Battle of Bull Run and was discharged after three months of service in August 1861.

Avery then joined the 1st New York Marine Artillery and was mustered in as a first lieutenant of Company B in early 1862. He served in Burnside's North Carolina Expedition and fought at the Battle of Tranter's Creek in June 1862. He was promoted to Captain of Company C on August 1, 1862. Avery was discharged on March 31, 1863.

Avery was appointed an acting ensign in the Union Navy on June 10, 1863 and served as the executive officer of the steamer USS Dawn. While assigned to the Dawn, Avery participated in the Battle of Wilson's Wharf in May 1864. He was discharged from the Navy on August 10, 1865.

He received the Medal of Honor on September 2, 1893 for bravery at the Battle of Tranter's Creek on June 5, 1862.

He died in the Bayside neighborhood of Warwick, Rhode Island at the age of 53.

He is buried in the North Burial Ground in Providence, Rhode Island.

== Medal of Honor citation ==
Citation:

Handled his battery with greatest coolness amidst the hottest fire.

== See also ==
- List of American Civil War Medal of Honor recipients: A–F
