= Saunders Pitman =

American silversmith

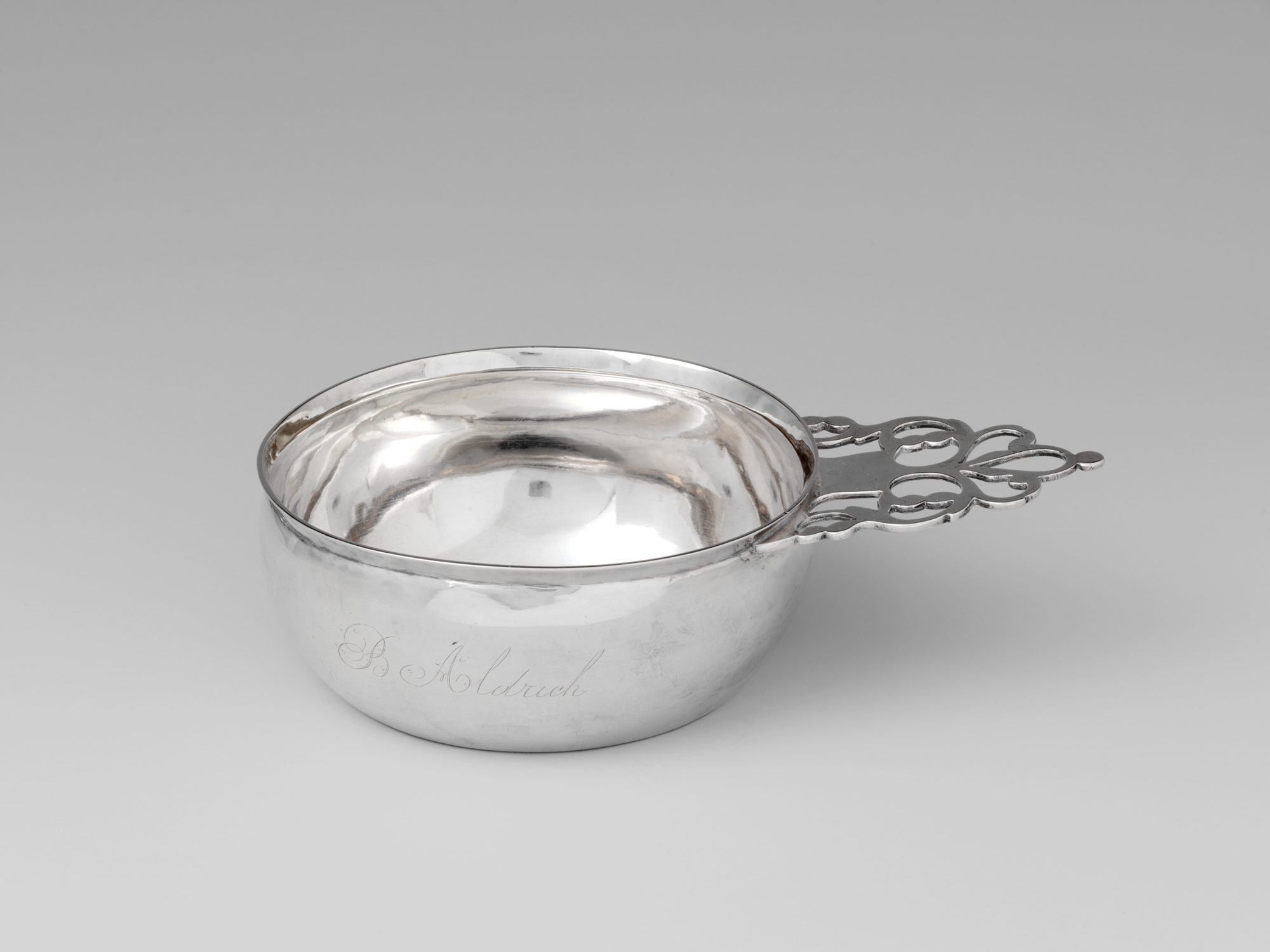
Porringer by Saunders Pitman, circa 1800

Saunders Pitman (December 3, 1734 - 15 August 15, 1804), also known as Sanders Pitman, was an American silversmith, active in Providence, Rhode Island.

Pitman was born in Providence, Rhode Island, made a freeman of that city in May 1760, and there married Mary Kinnicutt on June 29, 1760. He later married Amy Kinnicutt on February 9, 1772, and served from 1773 to 1784 as a member of local Fire Company, and 1777-1784 as Scavenger. Pitman worked circa 1755-1792 as a silversmith in Providence, with his shop at North corner of Main and Otis Streets until 1770. He worked in partnership with Seril Dodge circa 1793, then with his son-in-law Samuel Dorrance 1795-1800 as Pitman & Dorrance, and finally with Nehemiah Dodge in 1800 as Pitman & Dodge. In the Providence Gazette of April 2, 1796, he advertised:

PITMAN, SANDERS, Silversmith, &c. Takes this Method to acquaint his old Customers, and the Public, that he makes and sells, at his Shop, a few Doors North of the State-House, Gold and Silversmith's Ware, amongst which are the following Articles: Gold Necklaces from 7 to 10 Dollars, large and small Silver Spoons, and a Variety of the newest fashioned plated Shoe and Knee Buckles, plated Bridle Bitts in the newest Fashions, warranted to be superior for Service to any imported; also two Sets of elegant plated Mountings for Chaise, which would be sold on moderate Terms. Any Orders for plated or Brass Mountings for Chaise will be thankfully received, and executed in such a Manner as to insure Durability. Wanted, as an Apprentice to the above Business, an honest industrious Lad, about 14 Years of Age

He died in Providence, where he is buried in the North Burial Ground. His headstone reads:

Sacred To the memory of Mr. SANDARS PITMAN Goldsmith, who finished a long and useful life on the 15th day of August, AD 1804 in the 74th year of his age. His works were useful standard weight & pure, But still his virtues were applauded more.

Pitman's work is collected in the Metropolitan Museum of Art, the RISD Museum, and Winterthur Museum.
