= Rosa Peckham Danielson =

American painter (1842–?)

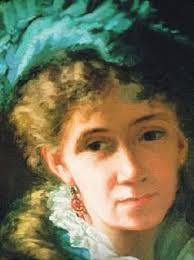
Portrait of May Alcott, Rosa Peckham, 1877, detail

Rosa (Rose) Frances Peckham Danielson, born October 28, 1842, in Killingly, Connecticut, was a nineteenth-century portrait and landscape artist. She was a founder of the Providence Art Club, where she was also the first female board member, serving as secretary and then as vice president. During her lifetime, her works were displayed at the Paris Salon on three occasions, and she exhibited at the Boston Art Club and the Providence Art Club. At her request, many of her paintings were destroyed after her death on August 22, 1922. More recently, in 2017, her paintings Girl Picking Flower, Breton Headdress, Portrait of Woman, [Schooners at Port], and Portrait of Katherine Peckham were displayed at the Providence Art Club's exhibition "Making Her Mark."

== Family life ==
Her mother was Catherine Davis Peckham and her father, Dr. Fenner Harris Peckham, was a doctor. She had five siblings, including Katherine Fenner, Fenner H, Ella Lois Torrey, Grace, and Mary Davis, three of whom went on to become doctors.

On January 25, 1881, in Providence, Rhode Island, Peckham married George Whitman Danielson, editor of the Providence Journal. Together they had 2 children: Whitman, who was born December 17, 1881, and Rosamund, born November 6, 1884. Her husband, George Whitman Danielson, died on March 25, 1884, before the birth of their second child.

== Training ==
Peckham graduated high school in Providence in 1862. She began her formal art training in 1868 with William Rimmer at the Cooper Union School of Design for Women in New York, prior to which she "studied drawing locally." Afterwards, Peckham traveled to Paris, where she furthered her art education. She attended the Académie Julian starting in 1876, studying under Jules Joseph Lefebvre. She shared a room with her sister Katherine Peckham and her friend Abigail May Alcott Nieriker. While in Paris, she also studied under François Flameng and Julius Rolshoven. She submitted a painting to the Paris Salon of 1877 and was rejected, after which she started a different piece to submit. She did not manage to finish this piece in time to submit it to the 1877 Salon; however, this piece would become arguably her most famous artwork: her Portrait of May Alcott Nieriker. Her subsequent artwork, Portrait of M.E.R, was accepted to the Paris Salon of 1878.

== Career ==
In 1880, Peckham founded the Providence Art Club, which was inspired by the small art community surrounding her studio in Providence. At the first exhibition of the club in 1880, Peckham displayed ten paintings. At the second exhibition, she displayed six more. Her artwork was also exhibited in a couple other art galleries in Providence. In I882, Peckham displayed her paintings, La Bresilienne and Brazilian Schoolgirl, at the Third Annual Exhibition of the Providence Art Club.

Around the time of her husband's death and the birth of her children, between around 1882 and 1888, Peckham took a brief recess from art. Prior to this, her known works show that she had painted mainly portraits, but afterward she began to paint more landscapes. She also painted multiple portraits of her children. At the beginning of the 1890s, Peckham traveled with her children to Europe, including Paris and Venice. While in Europe, Peckham painted a small collection of landscapes of Venice. She again exhibited at the Paris Salon in 1892 and 1893, with paintings entitled Portrait and Tulipes, respectively.

== Portrait of May Alcott ==
Her most famous work is the Portrait of May Alcott, painted in 1877. Abigail May Alcott Nieriker was an artist and the youngest of the four Alcott sisters upon which the book Little Women, by Louisa May Alcott, was based. May herself posed for the portrait and directed Peckham to subtly enhance her features. May's family was delighted by the portrait and hung it in Orchard House, the Alcott family home. May Alcott's mother says of the portrait:

"Miss Peckham has caught May's air and post most successfully, and her 'suaviter in mode' of tone; – years ago when her eyes were bright, and her heart was light, and she thought of Love and glory. The tone of high coloring is more the fashion than it has been, everything is more intense; Life itself is short and swift, music is loud and strong, more sound than harmony. The picture is May and nobody else, but the hat is Madame Williams' `Salon Chapeau.' May's own pretty hair, with her blue velvet snood, would have suited my taste better but Paris is all crimson and gilt, nude or dressed for exhibition."

== Other works ==
Peckham also painted many other portraits, miniatures, and landscapes. Some of her early works, most of which were portraits, included Farm with Pond (1869), untitled landscape (c. 1869), Portrait of William E. Richmond (1871), Portrait of Katherine Peckham (1877), Portrait of the Artist's Father, Dr. Fenner Harris Peckham (1878), Self Portrait (probably before 1881, Bowstead Collection), Portrait of Dr. Fenner Harris Peckham, Jr. (before 1881), Portrait of Rev. Augustus Woodbury (before 1881, destroyed), untitled cityscape (c. 1880), and Whitman Danielson at Four Months (1882). Her later works include two untitled landscapes (c. 1888), Rosamond Danielson (1888), Whitman Danielson (1890), Danielson Family Home, William Torrey Harris Birthplace, Venice (1891), Venice (with Domes) (1891), Venice (Doge's Palace) (1891), Venice (?) (1891), Infanta Margarita, Portrait of Katherine Peckham (1892, Bowstead Collection), Portrait of Edith and Grace Baldwin, (early 1890s, Whipple Collection, Putnam, CT), Study of a Girl (Grace Baldwin?), Girl Picking Flower (Grace Baldwin?) (1880?), Double Portrait (Rose Peckham Danielson and Katherine Baldwin?) (1892?), Whitman Danielson (1897), and Rosamond Danielson (1897). She also painted Landscape Painting (1869), Breton Headdress (aka Costumed Child) (1880, Providence Art Club), [Schooners at Port] (1880, Providence Art Club), and Portrait of Woman (ca. 1880). Most of these can be found in the Brainard Collection in Putnam, Connecticut, unless otherwise stated.
