= Fleur-de-lys Studios =

- Fleur-de-Lys Studios
- U.S. National Register of Historic Places
- U.S. National Historic Landmark
- U.S. National Historic Landmark District – Contributing property
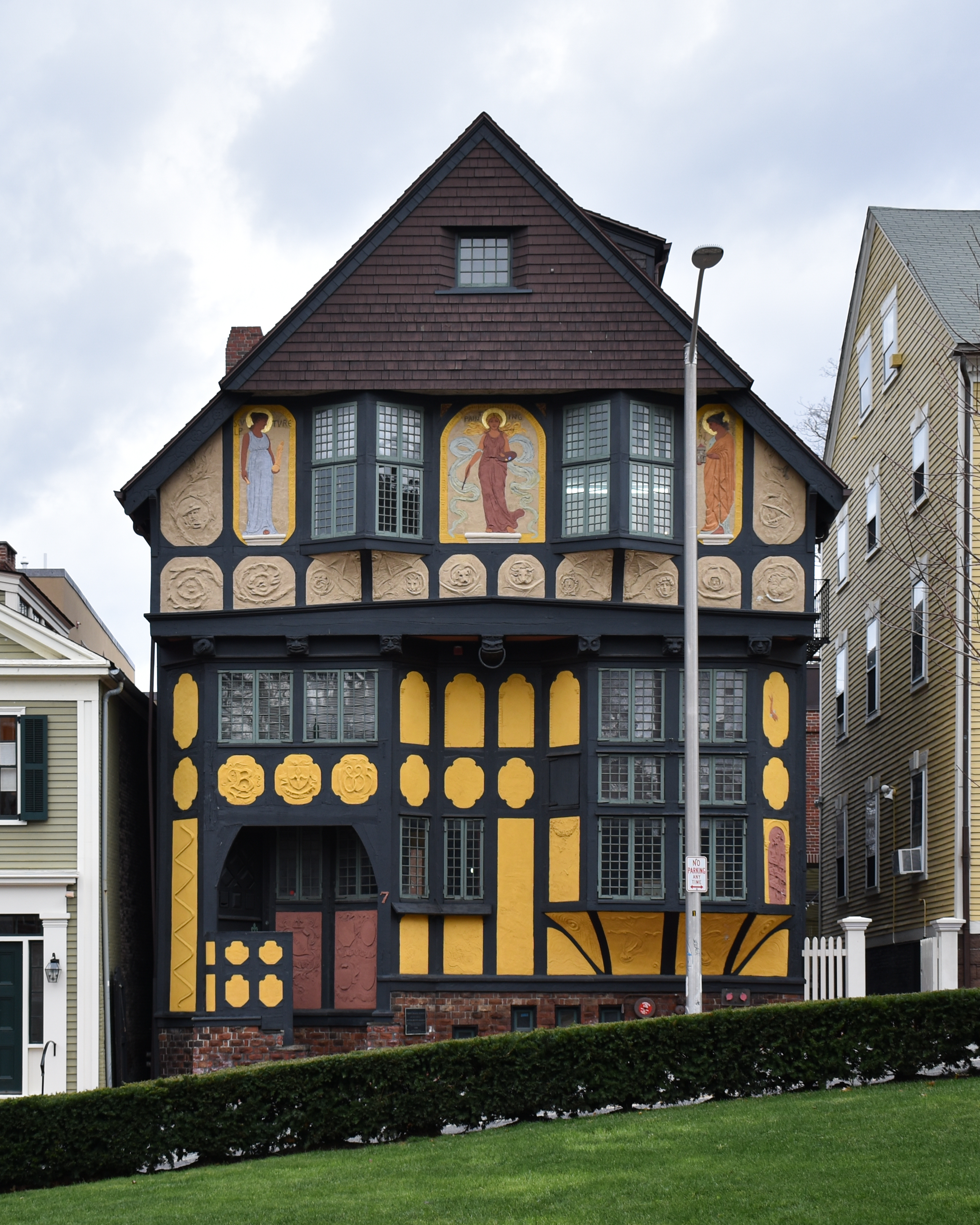
- Front elevation, 2020

- Location within Rhode Island Location within the United States
- Interactive map showing the location of Fleur-de-Lys Studios
- Location: 7 Thomas St., Providence, Rhode Island
- Coordinates: 41°49′40″N 71°24′33″W
- Built: 1885
- Architect: Edmund Russell Willson, et al.
- Architectural style: Tudor Revival
- Part of: College Hill Historic District (ID70000019)
- NRHP reference No.: 92001886

Significant dates
- Added to NRHP: October 5, 1992
- Designated NHL: October 5, 1992
- Designated NHLDCP: November 10, 1970

The Fleur-de-Lys Studios, also known as Fleur-de-Lis Studios or Sydney Burleigh Studio, is a historic art studio, and an important structure in the development of the Arts and Crafts Movement in the United States. It is located at 7 Thomas Street in the College Hill neighborhood of Providence, Rhode Island. It was designed by Sydney Burleigh and Edmund R. Willson, and built in 1885. It was added to the National Register of Historic Places and designated a National Historic Landmark in 1992. In addition, it is part of the College Hill Historic District.

== Description ==
The studio is a 2 1/2-story wood-frame building, set on the densely built north side of Thomas Street, opposite the First Baptist Meetinghouse (also a National Historic Landmark). Its main facade is half-timbered, with elaborately stuccoed sections filling the spaces between the timbers. On the first level, there are two bays, that on the right with a grouping of six casement windows in two tiers of three, of different sizes at each tier. The left bay has a recessed entranceway, topped by a row of stucco panels and windows above. The second level projects slightly, and has paired casement windows that project in a manner resembling a folding screen. On either side and in between these two sections are colored panels bearing allegorical representations of Sculpture, Painting, and Architecture. The triangular gable area above this level is shingled, with a recessed square window just below the gable point.

The interior is relatively simple, with an enclosed stair rising on the left side of the building to a mezzanine level, a full second floor, and the attic area. The first floor is divided, with a classroom and reception area in the south, and a studio space on the north side. A staircase in the northwest corner leads from the studio to the mezzanine. The mezzanine is open, with a small studio space over the entrance. Smaller studio spaces occupy the second floor and attic level.

The building was a design collaboration between the artist Sydney Richmond Burleigh (1853-1931) and the architect Edmund R. Willson (1853-1906), and was built in 1885–86 in a collaborative effort involving both local builders and a local version of the London-based Art Workers Guild established by Burleigh. Among the artists contributing to the decoration was Charles Walter Stetson.

The building drew immediate notice in architectural publications in recognition for its unification of useful and ornamental arts.

George William Whitaker, known as the "Dean of Providence Painters", shared space with Burleigh in the studio during the late 1800s.

In 1939, the structure was deeded to the Providence Art Club by Burleigh's widow. In accordance with the stipulation of her gift, the space is still used for artists studios.

== In popular culture ==
Horror writer H. P. Lovecraft made the Fleur-de-Lys building the residence of his character Henry Anthony Wilcox, a young artist and sculptor, in his famous tale "The Call of Cthulhu". It's described as "a hideous Victorian imitation of seventeenth-century Breton architecture which flaunts its stuccoed front amidst the lovely colonial houses on the ancient hill, and under the very shadow of the finest Georgian steeple in America". Bertrand K. Hart, then literary editor of the Providence Journal and author of a regular column, "The Sideshow", read the story in an anthology, T. Everett Harre's Beware After Dark! (1929) and was astounded to find that Wilcox's residence (7 Thomas Street) was the same as the address where he had once resided. Feigning offense, he vowed in his column of November 30, 1929, to send a ghost to Lovecraft's home at 3 a.m. to scare him; Lovecraft promptly wrote the poem "The Messenger" at 3 a.m. that night. Hart published the poem in his column of December 3.

== See also ==
- National Register of Historic Places listings in Providence, Rhode Island
- List of National Historic Landmarks in Rhode Island
- Angela O'Leary, American artist said to haunt the Fleur-de-Lys building
