= Sydney Richmond Burleigh =

American painter (1853–1931)

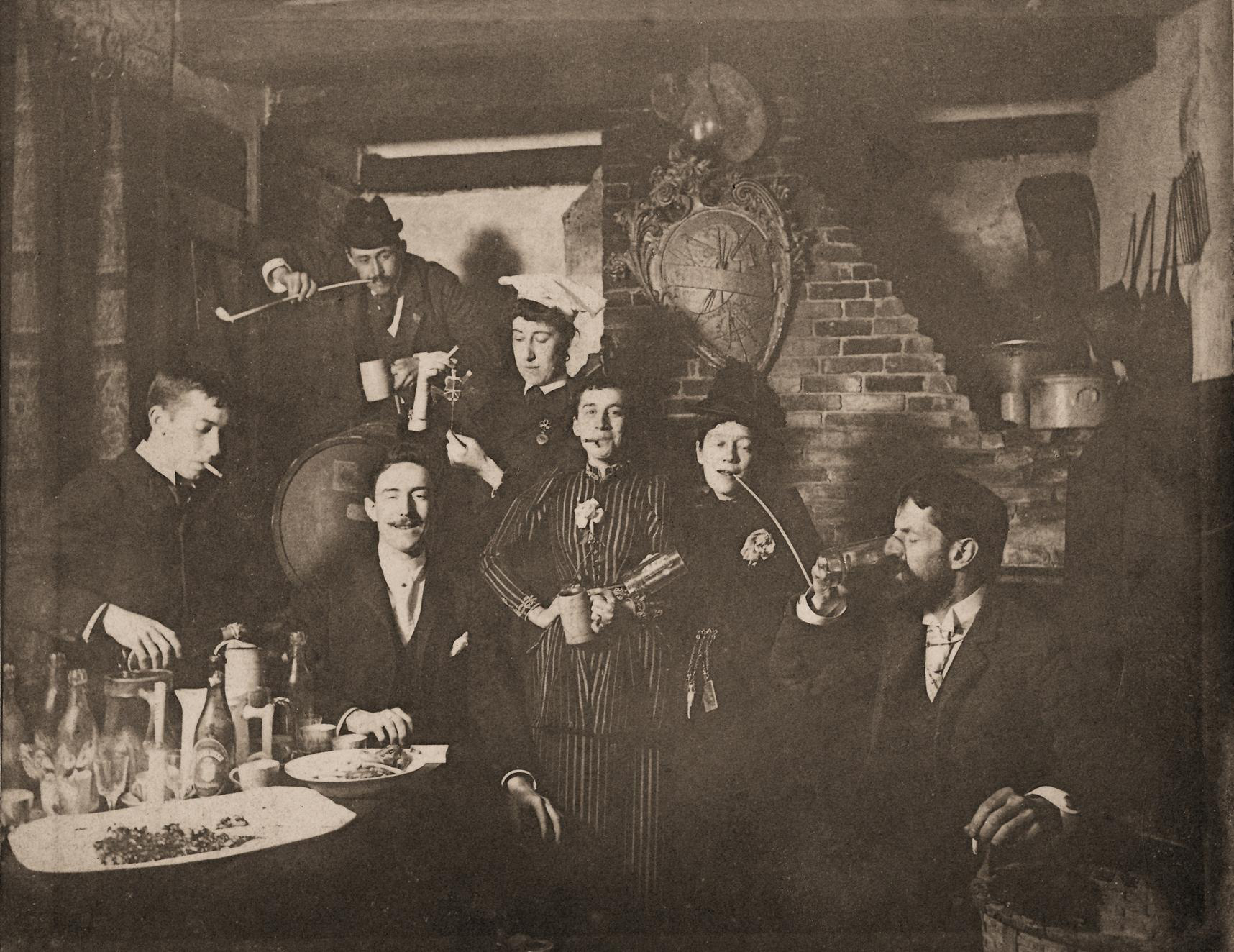
- Early Providence Art Club members, circa 1890. Sydney Burleigh sits at right.
- Born: July 7, 1853; Little Compton, Rhode Island, US
- Died: February 26, 1931 (aged 77); Providence, Rhode Island, US
- Known for: Watercolors, oil paintings, drawings, illustrations, furniture design

Sydney Richmond Burleigh (July 7, 1853 – February 26, 1931) was an American artist, known primarily for his watercolors but also for his oil paintings, drawings, illustrations, and building and furniture designs.

== Biography ==
Sydney Richmond Burleigh was born on July 7, 1853, in Little Compton, Rhode Island, a descendant of the Pilgrim William Bradford. In 1875, he married Sarah Drew Wilkinson (1851–1952) and, with her encouragement and wealth, became a full-time artist. He studied in Paris with Jean-Paul Laurens from 1876 to 1880 and then returned to Rhode Island, where he spent most of his life.

Burleigh rose to national prominence after receiving a bronze medal at the St. Louis Exposition in 1904 and an open prize from the Buffalo Society of Artists in 1913. He exhibited regularly at the Boston Art Club, the Providence Art Club, as well as the National Academy of Design, the Pennsylvania Academy of the Fine Arts, and the Newport Art Museum.

He also worked as an illustrator and collaborated with writer William Henry Frost on several children’s books.

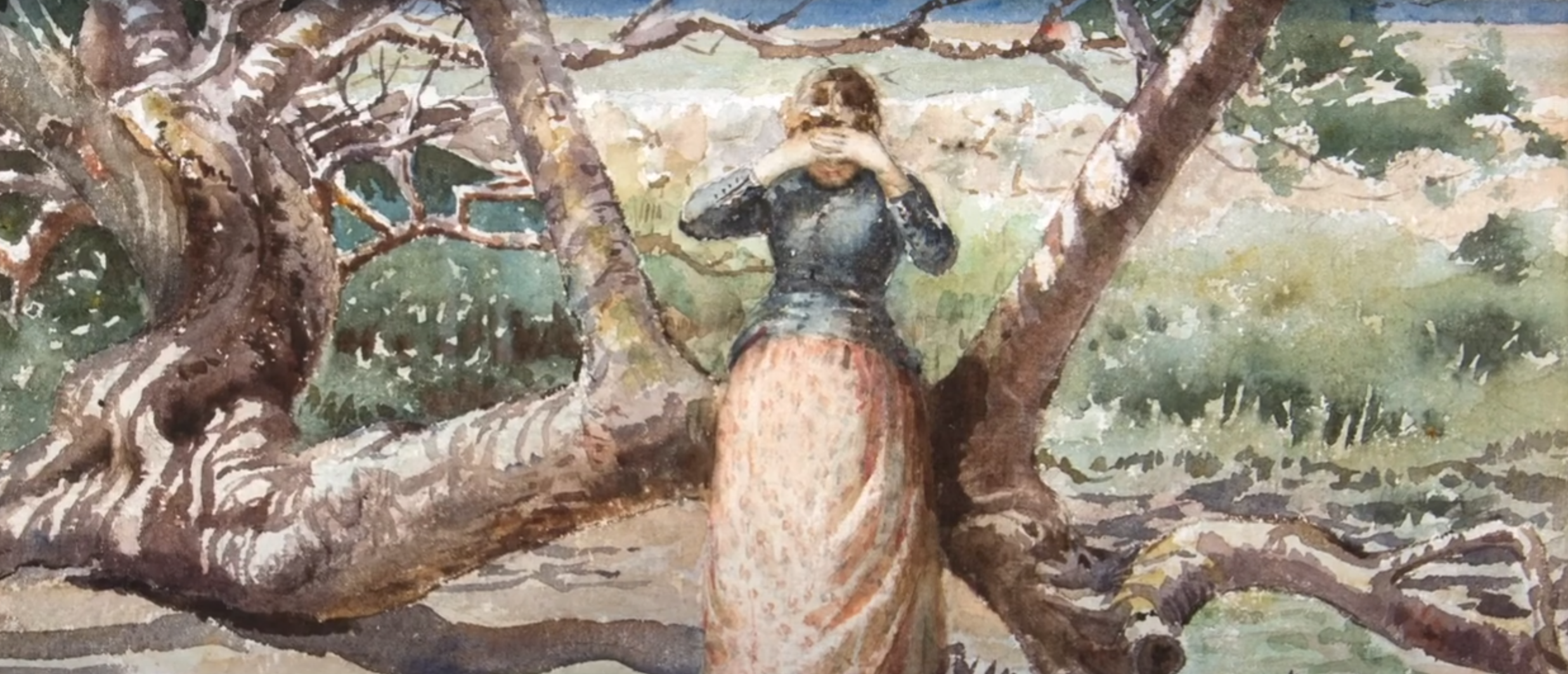
Painting by Burleigh of his student Angela O'Leary

He was a painter in the realist style, consistent with the academic style of his teacher, Laurens. Mabel Ducasse, an art critic for the Providence Journal, wrote of Burleigh’s art that "there is a quality in his work which suggests that of the masters of the Renaissance when they chose to employ line and wash. It is character — born of perfect certainty of touch and flowing freedom of line. It is seldom achieved by modern watercolorists, who most often mistake the function of their medium, which is that of drawing rather than painting."

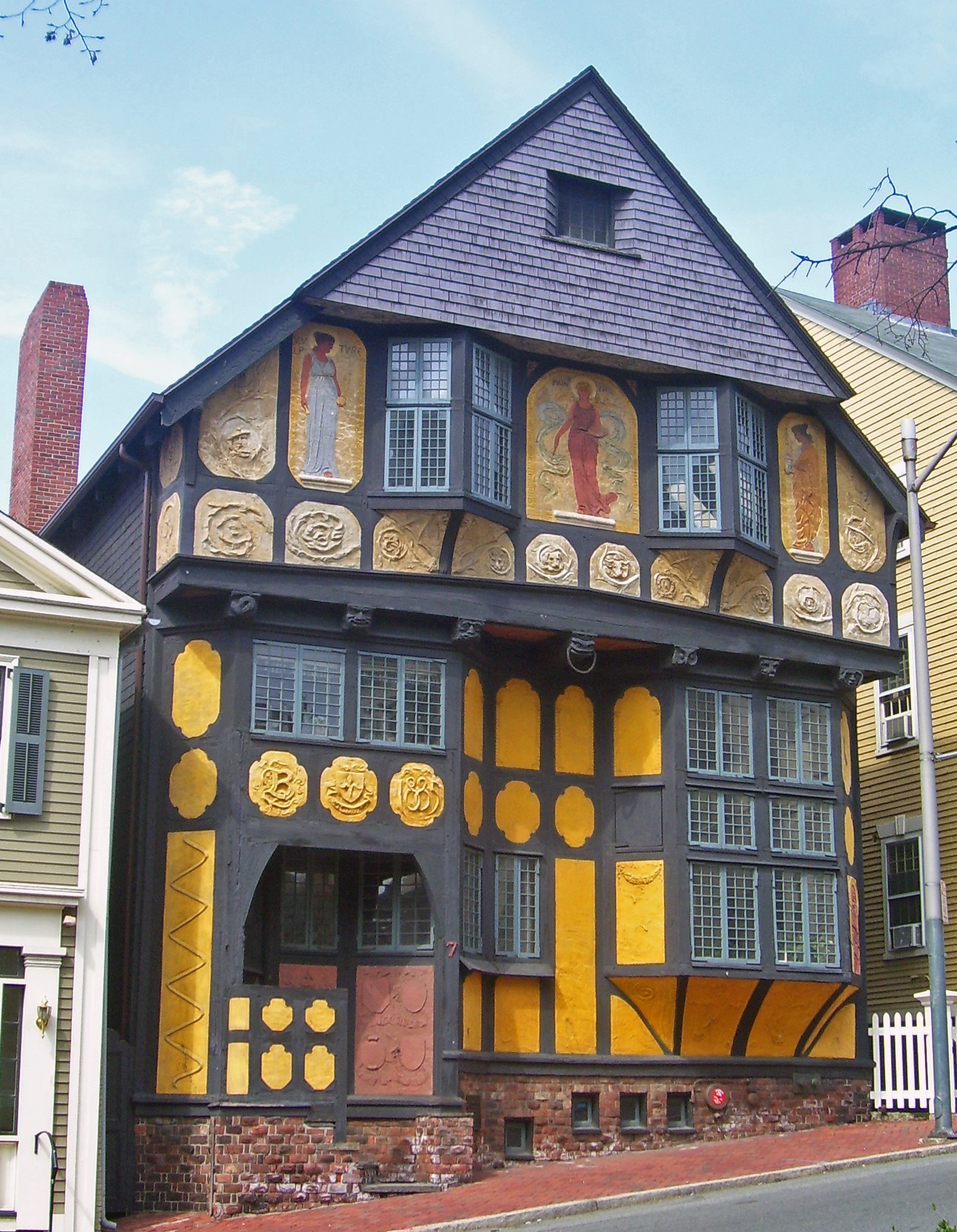
Burleigh designed the Fleur-de-lys Studios.

A man of versatile creativity, Burleigh designed the Fleur-de-lys Studios in Providence in collaboration with the architect Edmund Russell Willson of Stone, Carpenter, and Willson. Built in 1885 in conjunction with the Art Workers Guild, the building was to be used for art studios, including Burleigh’s own. It is an important monument to the American Arts and Crafts Movement and was designated a National Historic Landmark in 1992. It is now owned by the Providence Art Club, and retains its original purpose as artist' studios.

Another of his studios was a unique and eccentric little building known as the "Peggotty." Burleigh built it over the hull of a small sailboat that had been used as a ferry between Little Compton and Middletown, Rhode Island. It featured a thatched roof, and today it is on display at the Little Compton Historical Society.

Burleigh was a leading member of the art community in Rhode Island. He was a founder of the Providence Art Club in 1880 and was the first president of the Providence Watercolor Club. He had a long association with the Rhode Island School of Design, serving on the board of directors (1887–1893), as a teacher (1897–1906), and as a trustee (1919–1931). He received an honorary degree from Brown University in 1912.

His works are held in several private and public collections, including the Museum of Fine Arts in Boston and the museums at Brown University, the Rhode Island School of Design, the Rhode Island Historical Society, the Little Compton Historical Society, and the Henry Ford collection in Dearborn, Michigan.

Burleigh died on February 26, 1931, in Providence.

== Sources ==
- "Biography for Sydney Burleigh". AskART.
- "Fleur-de-Lys Studios". National Park Service. Archived from the original on November 23, 2010.
