= Rhode Island Watercolor Society =

Arts organization

The Rhode Island Watercolor Society is a non-profit arts organization in Pawtucket, Rhode Island. It is one of the oldest watercolor arts organizations in the United States.

The society was founded in 1896 as the Providence Watercolor Club, and changes its name to the current one in 1982. That year, the society moved from College Hill, Providence, Rhode Island to its current location in the boat house in Slater Park in Pawtucket, Rhode Island. The society renovated the boat house with the support of the city

The Rhode Island Watercolor Society now supports a membership program, classes and exhibitions, including its annual calendar contest.
