= New England's First Fruits =

1643 book

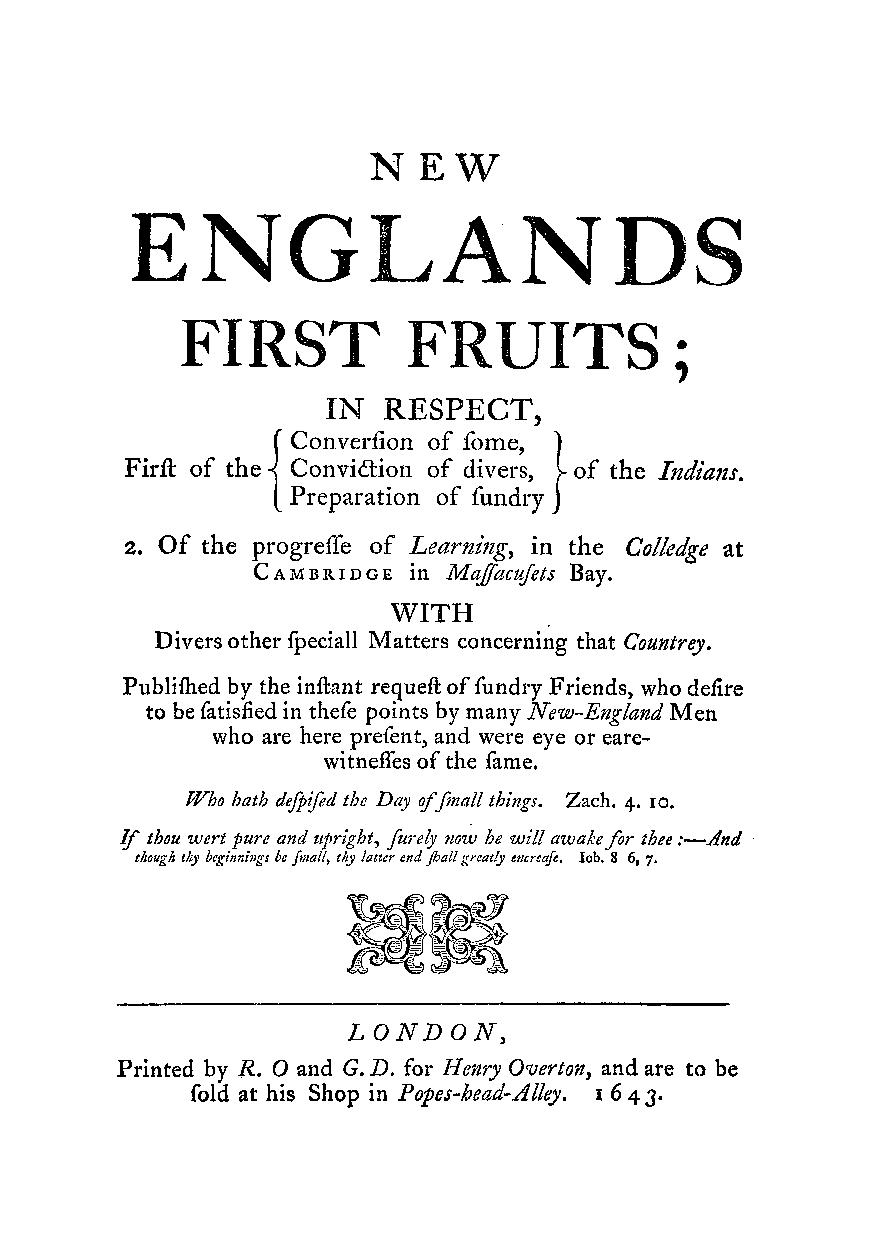
"New Englands First Fruits," Cover page, (1643)

New England's First Fruits was a book published in London in 1643 about the early evangelization efforts by the Puritans in colonial New England in defense of criticisms from England that little evangelism was being pursued in New England. It was the first publication to mention Harvard College.

The pamphlet was written by Puritan preachers Hugh Peter and Thomas Weld, who were in England at the time of publication raising funds for the Massachusetts Bay Colony. It was printed in London by Richard Oulton and Gregory Dexter for bookseller Henry Overton. The work is the first of a series of eleven pamphlets commonly known as the "Eliot Tracts," published between 1643 and 1671 in the interests of missionary work among the New England Indians. Pages 12 through 20 of the pamphlet are dedicated to Harvard College, founded in 1636, making it not only the first printed account of Harvard but the first printed account of any North American college. The text includes the college rules and curriculum in full, a description of the first Commencement ceremonies held in September 1642, and a passage justifying the establishment of the college, stating that the settlers feared leaving "an illiterate ministry to the churches, when our present ministers shall lie in the dust."

The book covers the conversions of Wequash Cooke and Dorcas ye blackmore into Protestant Christianity, and the apparent effort of Dorcas to gain her freedom with the help of the local church.

== Content ==
The book describes various evangelization efforts and results, including the conversion experience of Wequash Cooke (d.1642) as allegedly the first Native American conversion to Protestant Christianity in New England. The book also describes the conversion of Dorcas ye blackmore, an early African slave to Israel Stoughton, who joined the First Parish Church of Dorchester in 1641 and evangelized her fellow Native American servants and eventually attempted to gained her freedom with the help of the local church.

== Response ==
Roger Williams' A Key Into the Language of America was written partially to contradict the book's claims about successful evangelization in New England, particularly the alleged conversion of Wequash.
