= Narragansett language =

Extinct (c. 19th century) North American language

Narragansett
- Native to: United States
- Region: Rhode Island
- Ethnicity: 1,400 Narragansett and Mohegan-Pequot (1977 SIL)
- Extinct: ~18th-19th century
- Language family: Algic: Algonquian; Eastern; Narragansett

Language codes
- ISO 639-3: xnt
- Glottolog: narr1280
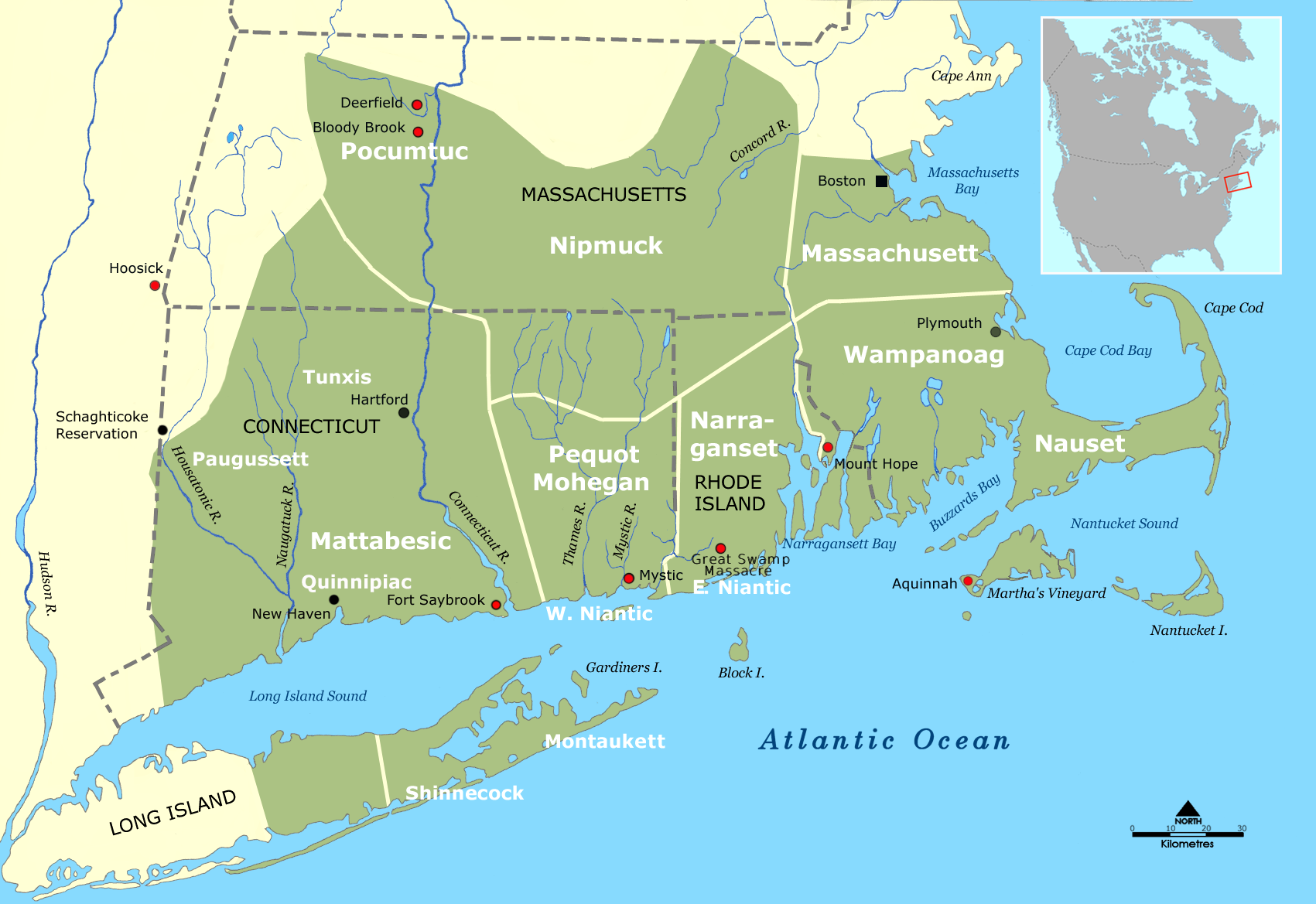
- The location of the Narragansett tribe and their neighbors, c. 1600

Narragansett /ˌnærəˈɡænsɪt/ is an extinct Algonquian language formerly spoken in most of what is today Rhode Island by the Narragansett people. It was closely related to the other Algonquian languages of southern New England like Massachusett and Mohegan-Pequot. The earliest study of the language in English was by Roger Williams, founder of the Rhode Island colony, in his book A Key Into the Language of America (1643).

== Name ==
The word narragansett means, literally, '(people) of the small point'. The "point" may be located on the Salt Pond in Washington County.

== History ==
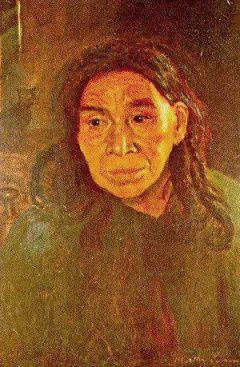
Martha Simon, Last of the Narragansetts, oil painting from 1857 by Albert Bierstadt

Traditionally the Narragansett tribe spoke the Narragansett language, a member of the Algonquian language family. The language became almost entirely extinct during the centuries of European colonization in New England through cultural assimilation.

The clergyman Ezra Stiles collected a list of 45 words from Narragansett, eight of which were transcribed in Hebrew characters.

The tribe has begun language revival efforts, based on early-20th-century books and manuscripts, and new teaching programs. The Narragansett spoke a "Y-dialect", similar enough to the "N-dialects" of the Massachusett and Wampanoag to be mutually intelligible. Other Y-dialects include the Shinnecock and Pequot languages spoken historically by tribes on Long Island and in Connecticut, respectively.

In the 17th century, Roger Williams, a co-founder of Rhode Island, learned the tribe's language. He documented it in his 1643 work, A Key Into the Language of America. Williams gave the tribe's name as Nanhigganeuck.

American English has absorbed a number of loan words from Narragansett and other closely related languages, such as Wampanoag and Massachusett. Such words include quahog, moose, papoose, powwow, squash, and succotash.

== Revival ==
According to Dr. Frank Waabu O'Brien, who has taught the language for the Aquidneck Indian Council, "Narragansett was understood throughout New England." He states that "Scholars refer to Massachusett and Narragansett as dialects of the same language," and has created a diagram of the relationships between the languages as described in their source documentation as well as instructional materials. A Facebook page entitled "Speaking Our Narragansett Language" has provided alphabet and vocabulary of the language.

== Phonology ==
Narragansett Consonants
	Labial	Alveolar	Post-alv./ Palatal	Velar		Glottal
	Labial	Alveolar	Post-alv./ Palatal	plain	lab.	Glottal
Plosive	p	t	tʲ	k	kʷ	
Nasal	m	n				
Affricate			tʃ			
Fricative		s	ʃ			h
Approximant	w		j			

Vowels
	Front	Central	Back
Close	i		u
Mid		ə	
Open		a ã	

== See also ==
- Narragansett people
- Eastern Algonquian languages
- The Narragansett Dawn
