= Papoose =

Word for a Native American child

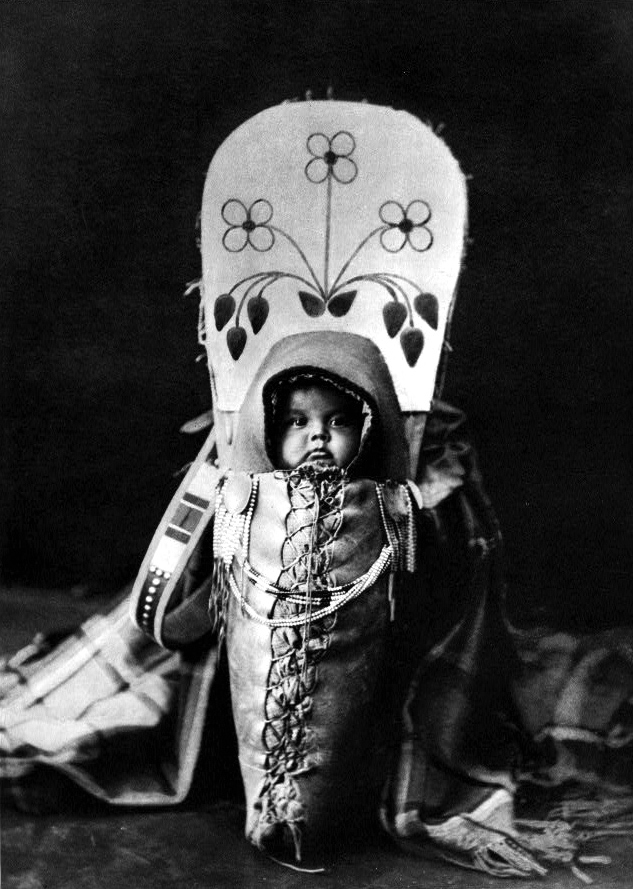
A child carrier, especially ones resembling those of Native Americans, is sometimes referred to as a papoose.

Papoose (from the Narragansett papoos, meaning "child") is an American English word whose present meaning is "a Native American child" (regardless of tribe) or, even more generally, any child, usually used as a term of endearment, often in the context of the child's mother. In 1643, Roger Williams recorded the word in his A Key into the Language of America, helping to popularize it.

== Papoose carrier ==
Cradle boards and other child carriers used by Native Americans are known by various names. In Algonquin history, the term papoose is sometimes used to refer to a child carrier. However, there are many different terms among the 573 federally recognized tribes, nations, and communities.
