= Cooking on the Wild Side =

- Starring: John Philpot Phyllis Speer
- No. of seasons: 7

Cooking on the Wild Side is a cooking show hosted by Phyllis Speer and John Philpot on the Arkansas Educational Television Network (AETN) and produced by the Arkansas Game and Fish Commission. The show was originally part of Arkansas Outdoors, and featured many cooking segments from that series alongside new content.

Phyllis Speer and John Philpot have co-hosted together for over 18 years, first on Arkansas Outdoors and then on Cooking on the Wild Side. Speer is known for her work in education, and a member of the Arkansas Game and Fish Commission's Hall of Fame. John Philpot is a "longtime regular on Arkansas radio and television programs," known for his work in education and agriculture. He is also a member of the Arkansas Agriculture Hall of Fame.

There was a reunion episode of its hosts (with all new content) in 2013.

== Series evolution ==
=== Arkansas Outdoors ===
Cooking on the Wild Side was originally part of Arkansas Outdoors, in which hosts Phyllis Speer and John Philpot played similar roles. Arkansas Outdoors began in 1991, and gained national exposure beyond AETN to include Versus Cable Television (previously known as Outdoor Life Network). Arkansas Outdoors was "produced by the Arkansas Game and Fish Commission with the intention of showcasing the natural beauty of Arkansas and the many sporting and nature activities available in the wild, each segment concludes with Speer sharing a recipe or two, using her cast iron cookery."

Arkansas Outdoors production stopped in early 2011, although Cooking on the Wild Side continued.

=== Series breakoff ===
Cooking on the Wild Side became its own series in 2006 as Cooking on the Wild Side: A Farmer's Market Tour with Phyllis in part "as an answer to the requests the station received for Phyllis Speer's recipes," according to AETN.

It evolved into its modern format in 2012 and was distributed nationally in 2014.

== Episodes ==
Episodes showcase Arkansas wild game, how to use a Dutch oven, and the interplay between the two hosts. According to Speer, the Dutch oven is underused because:

So many people are afraid they’re going to do something to harm their pot, but the wonderful thing about cast iron is that they are very durable and nearly indestructible.

— Phyllis Speer

Previous recipes have included

- Squirrel Tamales
- Curried Goose
- Venison Jerky
- Dutch Oven Enchiladas
- Venison Smoked Sausage
- Venison Grillades and Grits
- Squirrel and Dumplings
- Dove Stroganoff

== Episode List and Contents ==
Cooking on the Wild Side featured recipes sourced from the local area, and often featured local game. Showcasing these recipes allowed Cooking on the Wild Side, and the Arkansas Game and Fish Commission, to showcase local culture and history, as well as teaching Arkansans how to cook game hunted in their state.

Season 1
Season	Contents	Aired
S01E01	Hearty Venison Lasagna with Balsamic Tomatoes & Basil and Chocolate Turtle Cupcakes	August 1, 2012
S01E02	Venison Meatballs with Yin & Yang Mashed Potatoes, Garlic Green Beans, and Apple-Pie Cake	September 1, 2012
S01E03	Pecan Crusted Tilapia with Campfire Roasted Potatoes and Freezer Slaw	October 1, 2012
S01E04	Crawfish Stuffed Mushrooms with Grilled Peaches and Twice-Grilled Potatoes	November 1, 2012

Season 2
Season	Contents	Aired
S02E01	Venison Taco Soup, Wild Turkey and Pepper Casserole, Ozark Fricassee	January 1, 2013
S02E02	Elk Swiss Steak, Dutch Oven Garlic Rolls, Omelet in a Bag	February 1, 2013
S02E03	Venison Pizza Casserole, Triple D Appetizer (Deer, Duck, & Dove), Absolut-ly Wild Turkey	March 1, 2013
S02E04	Mary's Very Berry Blueberry Pie, Venison Goulash, Venison Pasta Sauce	April 1, 2013
S02E05	Wild Spring Pizza, Corn Loaf, Grilled Turkey Kabobs	May 1, 2013
S02E06	Camp Howdy Salsa, Wild Turkey Fajitas, Buffalo River Wings	June 1, 2013
S02E07	Grilled Catfish Pate, Crayfish Quiche, Tin-Can Ice-Cream	July 1, 2013
S02E08	Dove Breast Italiano, Rabbit with Mushroom and Sour Cream Sauce, Light and Cheesy Grilled Trout	August 1, 2013
S02E09	Cajun Black-Eyed Peas, Grilled Turkey Salad, Grilled Wild Turkey Appetizers	September 1, 2013
S02E10	Squirrel Chili Stew, Donna's Inside-Out Cake, Mazelle's Stuff	October 1, 2013
S02E11	Barbequed Canned Venison, Settler's Beans, Dove/Quail Enchilada Casserole	November 1, 2013
S02E12	Stuffed Elk Meatballs, Dutch Oven Cornish Hens, Sausage Biscuit Surprise	December 1, 2013

Season 3
Season	Contents	Aired
S03E01	Homemade Onion-Bacon Dip, Elk Stroganoff Marinade, Doughnut Pudding with Rum Sauce	January 1, 2014
S03E02	Southern Fried Quail and Gravy, Roast Goose in a Bag, Ginger Grilled Chukar	February 1, 2014
S03E03	Striper Boil, Jim and Patty's Pig Newton's, Topsy-Turvy Pizza	March 1, 2014
S03E04	Sweet Potato Hash, Wild Turkey Enchiladas, Coot-A-Licious Stew	April 1, 2014
S03E05	Cheesy Turkey Bake, Venison Grillades & Grits, Dutch Oven Black Forest Cake	May 1, 2014
S03E06	Black Walnut Pie, Wild Turkey Piccata, Chicken and Olive Stuffed French Bread	June 1, 2014
S03E07	Steamboats, Ribbit’ing Frog Legs, Venison Burrito	July 1, 2014
S03E08	Ozark Fish Chowder, Arkansas Catfish Sliders, Chipotle Mayonnais, Loaded Baked Potatoes Salad	August 1, 2014
S03E09	Cheryl's Chocolate Cobbler, Venison Slow Cooker Fajitas, Doc McCoroy's Fames Peach Cobbler, Panhandler Spaghetti	September 1, 2014
S03E10	Catfish Hoagies, Honey-Pecan Crusted Walleye, Venison Sausage Balls	October 1, 2014
S03E11	Squirrel Enchiladas, Mexican Venison and Rice Supper, Donna's Inside-Out Cake, Pepper Cheese Biscuits	November 1, 2014
S03E12	Sausage Biscuit Surprise, Stuffed Elk Meatballs, Dutch Oven Cornish Hens, Ice Cream Sandwiches	December 1, 2014

Season 4
Season	Contents	Aired
S04E01	Camp Howdy Salsa, Mexican Breakfast Eggs, Jana's Fresh Apple Cake, Apple Cream Cheese Frosting	January 1, 2015
S04E02	Venison Burgundy, Scotch Eggs, Black Bean Soup	February 1, 2015
S04E03	Mountain Man Breakfast, Stuffed Fish Supreme, Pan-Fried Trout	March 1, 2015
S04E04	Venison Steak in Scotch Sauce, Polk Salad, Honey Glazed Fish Fillets	April 1, 2015
S04E05	Smoked Dove Kabobs, Venison Parmesan, Blackened Trout, Apple Pie Cake	May 1, 2015
S04E06	All Purpose Marinade, Phyl's Biscuits, and Strawbanut Ice Cream	June 1, 2015
S04E07	Duck Jambalaya, Papaw Nut Bread, Crispy Fried Fish, Dutch Oven Blackberry Cobbler	July 1, 2015
S04E08	Farmer's Market Gazpacho, Creole Catfish, Ooey Gooey Bread	August 1, 2015
S04E09	Fish Tacos, Elam Boys Fresh Homemade Salsa, Chipotle Tartar Sauce, Venison Mexican Skillet, Blackberry Trifle	September 1, 2015
S04E10	Double Dipped Battered Onion Rings, Braised Venison in Red Wine, Lucky Hunter Venison Stew	October 1, 2015
S04E11	Grilled Bear Steak, Turkey Thigh Stew, Catfish Patties	November 1, 2015
S04E12	Fried Turkey Strips and Gravy, Grilled Veggie Kabobs, Garlic Mashed Potatoes, Buttermilk Ice Cream, Black-Eyed Pea Dip	December 1, 2015

Season 5
Season	Contents	Aired
S05E01	Jettie Mae's Panhandler Spaghetti, Baked Quail in Wild Rice, Wild Turkey Satay	January 1, 2016
S05E02	Roasted Garlic Cheese Grits, Crockpot Beans with Chukkar, Mazzie's Fried Apple Pies, Smothered Doves	April 1, 2016
S05E03	Fresh Fruit Salsa, Goobered Hash Browns, Venison Sausage, Venison Sausage Gravy, Eggs Ozarkia, Roasted Chicken Salad	May 1, 2016
S05E04	Stuffed Catfish, Mandarin Salad, Zach's Fried Crappie	June 1, 2016
S05E05	Venison "Sloppy John's", Steamboats, Smoked Summer Sausage, Mule Skinner Chili	July 1, 2016
S05E06	Sam's Larrupin BBQ Ribs, Smoked Corn Pudding, Three Bean Salad, Donna's Inside-Out Cake	August 1, 2016
S05E07	Venison Skillet Supper, Ozark Caviar, Scented Geranium Angel Food Cake	September 1, 2016
S05E08	Cheesy Venison Cornbread, Harvest Stew, Chili Cheese Corn, Peach of a Shortcake	October 1, 2016
S05E09	Doves with Rice in Madeira, Venison Stir Fry, Squirrel Mulligan, Italian Cornbread Fritter	November 1, 2016
S05E10	Breakfast Burritos, Joe's Breakfast Surprise, Potato and Egg Taco, Camp Howdy Salsa, Mexican Breakfast Eggs	December 1, 2016

Season 6
Season	Contents	Aired
S06E01	Cupboard Stew, Harvest Stew with Pepper Biscuits, Campfire Stew, Duck and Mushroom Soup	January 1, 2017
S06E02	Venison Taco Pie, Squirrel and Dumplings, Doc McCoy's Famous Peach Cobbler	February 1, 2017
S06E03	Venison Jerky, Ground Venison Jerky, Elk Stromboli, Venison Parmesan	March 1, 2017
S06E04	Venison Burritos, Venison Steak and Mushroom Sandwiches, Phyl's BBQ Beans, Dutch Oven Blackberry Cobbler	April 1, 2017
S06E05	Venison Shish Kabobs, Stuffed Venison Burgers, Venison Roast, Mexican Crockpot Venison	May 1, 2017
S06E06	Phyl's Hush Puppies, Hillbilly Fish and Chips, Dishwasher Trout, Dishwasher Trout, Blackened Trout	June 1, 2017
S06E07	Persimmon Bread, Smoked Catfish Chef Salad, Honey French Salad Dressing, Buck and Bourbon Stew, Impossibly Possible Dutch Oven Ice Cream	July 1, 2017
S06E08	Cornbread Salad, Creek Bank Taters, Catfish Patties, Venison BBQ Sandwiches	August 1, 2017
S06E09	Basque Bread, Grilled Dover Kabobs, Dove Stroganoff and Smiley Bars	September 1, 2017
S06E10	Redneck Gourmet Kielbasa Stew, Brunswick Stew, Spanish Stew with Olives, Potjiekos-African Pot Stew	October 1, 2017
S06E11	Wild Turkey Jambalaya, Trash Can Turkey, Wild Turkey Hash, Deep Fried Wild Turkey	November 1, 2017
S06E12	Venison Chili Cheese Dip, Franks in a Loaf, Smokey Venison Meatballs, Venison Sausage Balls	December 1, 2017

Season 7
Season	Contents	Aired
S07E01	Company's Coming Venison Pie, Fish with Spicy Cajun Sauce, Wild Turkey Gumbo, Smoked Trout Spread	January 1, 2018
S07E02	Baked Quail, Goose Jerky, Oven Fried Quail, Red Rice, Duck Parmesan	February 1, 2018
S07E03	Stuffed Quail with Honey Orange Glaze, Yum-O-Duck, Fried Quail with Mushrooms	March 1, 2018
S07E04	Squirrel Tamales, Curried Goose, Venison Jerky, Dutch Oven Enchiladas	April 1, 2018
S07E05	Venison Smoked Sausage, Venison Grillades and Grits, Sunrise Skillet Scramble, Mexican Breakfast Eggs	May 1, 2018
S07E06	Loaded Baked Potatoes Salad, Streamside Fried Perch, Fish Gumbo, and Baked Bass Parmesan	July 1, 2018
S07E07	Venison Smoked Sausage, Venison Grillades and Grits, Sunrise Skillet Scramble, and Mexican Breakfast Eggs	June 1, 2018
S07E08	Elk Henley in Puffed Pastry, Barbecued Squirrel, Grilled Marinated Quail, Quick Pasta Salad, Lucky Hunter Venison Stew	August 1, 2018
S07E09	County Fried Venison, Venison Chili, Chicken Chili Pie	September 1, 2018
S07E10	Venison Ragout, Bean Hole Baked Beans, Jo's Duck Casserole, Marinated Bear Roast, Orange Rind Carrots, Black-Eyed Peas Creole	October 1, 2018
S07E11	Venison Pinwheels, Arkansas Duck Dressing w/Cranberry Salsa, Cranberry Salsa, Southwest Sheppard's Pie	November 1, 2018
S07E12	Cornbread Salad, Brunswick Stew, Smiley Bars	December 1, 2018

Additional Specials
Season	Contents	Aired
SPECIAL 0x1, "Phyllis and John Reunion Part 1"	Arkansas Wild Cakes with Remoulade Sauce, Succotash Salad, Apple Pizza	October 31, 2014
SPECIAL 0x2, "Phyllis and John Reunion Part 2"	Butternut Guacamole, Dutch Oven Spicy Chicken Casserole, Dutch Oven Pear Custard Pie	November 2, 2014

=== 2013 Reunion ===
Phyllis Speer and John Philpot reunited in 2013 for a two-part special titled "Cooking on the Wild Side: A Phyllis & John Reunion." The special first aired 9 a.m. Saturday, Dec. 7, 2013 on AETN, then repeated 4 p.m. Saturday, Dec. 14, and 1:30 p.m. Sunday, Dec. 15.

The reunion special was dedicated to the memory of Arkansas Outdoors producer, Jim Holmes.

== Feature on Smithsonian Wildlife Festival ==
On Friday, June 30, 2023, the Smithsonian Folklife Festival hosted Phyllis Speer on the Ralph Rinzler Main Stage. The presentation was titled, "Cooking on the Wild Side," and Speer discussed the show as well as her co-host as she cooked smoked trout cakes. Speer also discussed why and how trout is found in Arkansas due to unusual circumstances relating to the flow of the river and a series of dams. Videos of the presentation may be found on the Smithsonian Folklife site, as well as on YouTube.

== Cookbooks and DVDs ==
To celebrate the reunion of its hosts during the 2013 special Cooking on the Wild Side: A Phyllis & John Reunion, AETN published both a companion cookbook and DVDs of the reunion.

The cookbook was also titled Cooking on the Wild Side: A Phyllis & John Reunion and contained "more than 50 viewer-submitted recipes." Recipes in the cookbook included:

- Arkansas Wild Cakes, Remoulade Sauce
- Succotash Salad
- Apple Pizza
- Butternut Guacamole
- Dutch Oven Spicy Chicken Casserole
- Dutch Oven Pear Custard Pie
- Bar-B-Que Potatoes
- Pitchfork Fondue With Dipping Sauces
- Fried Biscuits
