= Gregory Dexter =

American politician (1610 – c. 1700)

7th President of Providence and Warwick
- In office May 17, 1653 – May 16, 1654
- Preceded by: John Smith
- Succeeded by: Nicholas Easton (unified with Newport and Portsmouth)

Personal details
- Born: 1610 Old, Northamptonshire England (stated in his Bible)
- Died: April 23, 1700 (aged 89–90) Providence
- Spouse: Abigail Fullerton
- Children: 5
- Occupation: Printer, limestone quarry owner, minister
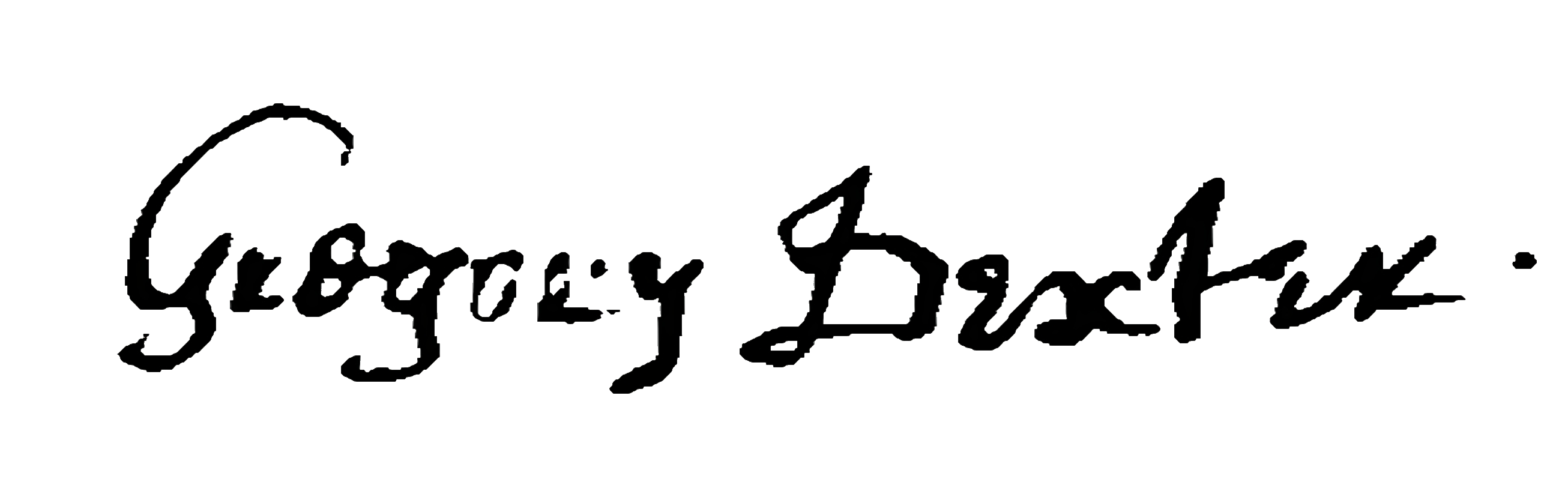
- Signature

Gregory Dexter (1610 – c. 1700) was a renowned printer of important and controversial books and pamphlets in London. In New England, he assumed various roles including serving as a consultant to printers, a Baptist minister, an owner of a limestone quarry, and a political figure elected as president of the combined towns of Providence and Warwick in colonial Rhode Island. He is best known as the printer of Roger Williams's book A Key into the Language of America in 1643, the first English translation of a Native American language.

== England ==
Gregory Dexter was born in the year 1610 in Old, Northamptonshire, England.

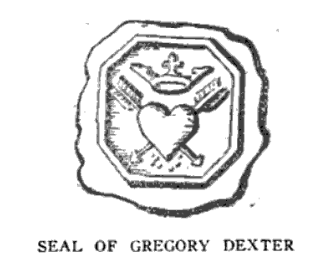

In 1632, Gregory Dexter joined Elizabeth Allde in London after beginning his eight-year printing apprenticeship with her. It was around this time that Allde published Histriomastix, a play by Puritan William Prynne. The play resulted in Prynne's imprisonment in the Tower of London. While still an apprentice in 1637, Dexter was arrested for printing a pamphlet titled "Instructions to Church Wardens" by Prynne. In 1639, Dexter became a master printer and was granted admission to the Worshipful Company of Stationers at Stationers Hall. He partnered with Richard Oulton, the son of Elizabeth Allde, who had taken over his mother's business.

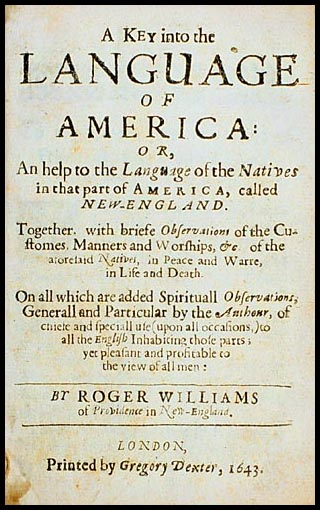
Roger Williams' A Key into the Language of America

Gregory Dexter was incarcerated by the House of Commons in 1641 at Gatehouse Prison, where he was ordered to stay "during the Pleasure of this House" for releasing a pamphlet called "The Protestation Protested," which was authored by Puritan Henry Burton. In October 1642, while Gregory was serving in the military, his wife, Abigail Dexter (née Fullerton), was apprehended by the House of Lords for printing prohibited literature and for refusing to disclose the names of the authors. She was jailed at King's Bench until "the Pleasure of this House be further known."

Following their imprisonments, the Dexters continued to publish works by notable authors such as John Milton, John Goodwin, Lawrence Sanders, and Andrew Perne. In 1643, they published A Key into the Language of America, a translation of the Narragansett dialect of Algonquin by Roger Williams. In 1644, they anonymously (but identified by the Dexters' damaged type) released several works by Roger Williams on religious liberty and soul freedom including Mr. Cotton's Letter Lately Printed and Queries of Highest Consideration. Williams's book The Bloudy Tenent is sometimes attributed to the Dexters, but a typeface analysis points to the printers Thomas Paine and Matthew Simmons.

In 1644, the Stationers' Company conducted a raid on the Dexters' shop, which resulted in the confiscation of their printing equipment and presses, leaving them unable to continue their printing business in London.

== New England ==
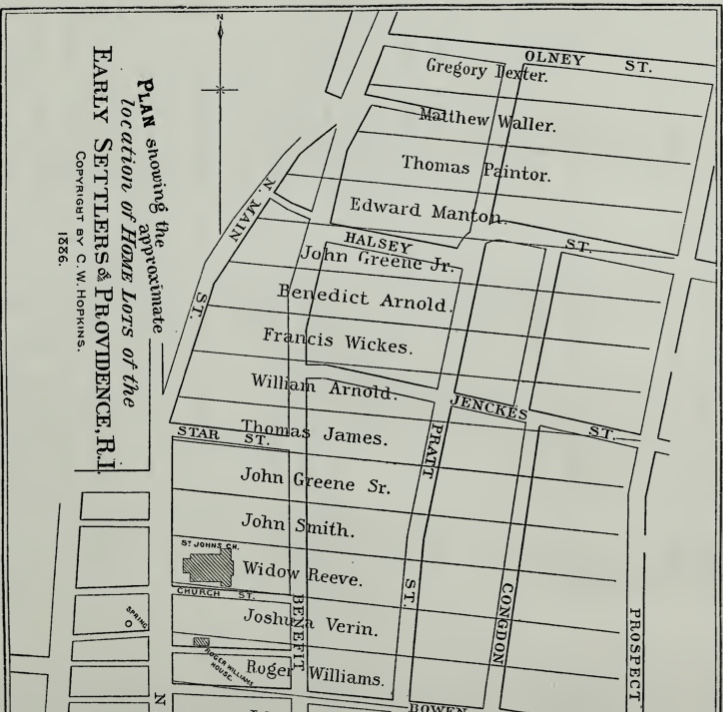
Map showing western part of Dexter's lot in Providence

The Dexters moved to New England, where they joined Roger Williams at Providence. There, Gregory Dexter was granted a slender five-acre plot of land that extended from present-day North Main Street to Hope Street, along Olney Street.

Following his relocation to Providence, Gregory Dexter provided consultation services to some of the earliest printers who emerged in the American colonies. He aided Matthew Daye in Cambridge, Massachusetts, and subsequently assisted Samuel Green after he acquired Daye's printing shop in 1648. Dexter made annual visits to support Green and requested only a copy of the almanac in exchange for his services.

In Providence and the colony, Gregory Dexter was chosen to serve several roles in government. He was elected to the General Court of Trial and became the town clerk of Providence in 1648 and served in that position until 1654. Between 1651 and 1654 he served as a commissioner in the colony's General Assembly, and in 1653 he was selected as president for the joint towns of Providence and Warwick. Following his tenure, his successor played a vital role in reuniting the four towns of Providence, Warwick, Newport, and Portsmouth.

Subsequently, Dexter turned his focus towards religion and became a pastor at the First Baptist Church in Providence, where he remained from 1654 until his passing in 1700. He took over from Thomas Olney, who resigned from his position in 1652 due to a disagreement regarding the "laying on of hands." Dexter worked alongside co-pastor William Wickenden until 1669, when he became the head minister.

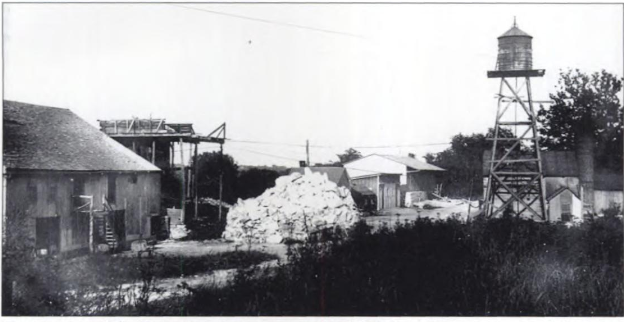
Dexter Lime Quarry in 1910

Sometime after 1662, Dexter established Dexter Lime Quarry, the remains of which are on present-day Dexter Rock Road in Lime Rock, Lincoln, Rhode Island. The demand for limestone was high due to its applications in leather tanning, candle-making, and as a component of plaster and mortar. In August 1669, Roger Williams sent a letter to John Winthrop Jr., the governor of Connecticut, endorsing Dexter's enterprise:

Sir, I have encouraged Mr. Dexter to send you a limestone, and to salute you with this enclosed. He is an intelligent man, a master printer of London and conscionable (though a Baptist), therefore maligned and traduced by William Harris (a doleful generalist). Sir, if there be any occasion of yourself (or others) to use any of this stone, Mr. Dexter hath a lusty team and lusty sons, and very willing heart (being a sanguine, cheerful man), to do yourself or any (at your word especially) service upon very honest and cheap considerations.

In 1676, during King Philip's War, the Dexters took refuge in Long Island. During the attack Dexter's Providence home was burned down.

Dexter died in 1700 and was buried in Providence on his home lot near the present day intersection of Benefit and North Main Streets. His wife Abigail died in 1706.

== Family ==
Gregory Dexter's father, Gregory, was baptized in St. Andrew's (Anglican) Church in the parish of Old, Northamptonshire, England in 1581. He was a yeoman who owned land on Richard Knightley's estate in Northamptonshire, and he and his wife, Isabel (surname unknown), had a daughter named Isabel who was also baptized in Old.

Although the younger Gregory Dexter's baptismal record has not been found, historian Bradford Swan argues that it can be safely assumed he was born in Old, rather than in Olney, Buckinghamshire, as some older genealogies suggest. A further reference can be found in Gregory's Bible, which remains in the possession of his descendants.

In England, Gregory Dexter married Abigail Fullerton prior to 1642. They had five children—Stephen, John, James, Abigail, and Peleg—all of whom were born in Providence.
