= Dorcas ye blackmore =

- Born: c. 1620
- Died: 1677 (aged 56–57)

Dorcas ye blackmore (c. 1620–after 1677) was one of the first African Americans to settle in New England whose name has survived in records. In 1641, she became the first known African American admitted to the local Puritan congregation.

== Biography ==
Born in Africa c. 1620, Dorcas is believed to have arrived in Boston, Massachusetts from the Providence Island colony in 1638 aboard the slave ship Desire. After the English victory in the brutal Pequot War, the ship was chartered to Bermuda to trade 17 Pequot prisoners of war for "some cotton, tobacco, and negroes, etc.".

Records show that in 1641, Dorcas was living in Dorchester, Massachusetts in servitude to Israel Stoughton, a prominent colonial leader and businessman. The same year, she joined the First Parish Church of Dorchester after presenting a public testimony to the congregation. In the months following, the colony passed a law formally sanctioning the slavery of Africans and Native Americans in the Massachusetts Body of Liberties. Such laws stated that no one was to be exempt from servitude by virtue of church membership. Dorcas' evangelical work with Native American servants and her admission into the congregation were detailed in the early colonial publication, New England's First Fruits.

In 1644, Israel Stoughton died without denoting Dorcas' status in his will. It is believed that Dorcas continued to live with his widow, Elizabeth Stoughton, as a member of her household for some time after Israel's death. Before 1652, Dorcas married a man named Matthew. They had two known children: Matthew Jr., who was baptized in Boston in 1652, and Martha, who died in 1654. In 1653, congregationalists of Dorchester's First Church, including Rev. Richard Mather and Elder Henry Withington, sought to purchase Dorcas' freedom through community fundraising. In 1677, Dorcas formally transferred her membership from the Dorchester Church to the First Church in Boston, where she became an African American congregationalist.

== See also ==
- Crispus Attucks
