= A Key into the Language of America =

1643 book by Roger Williams

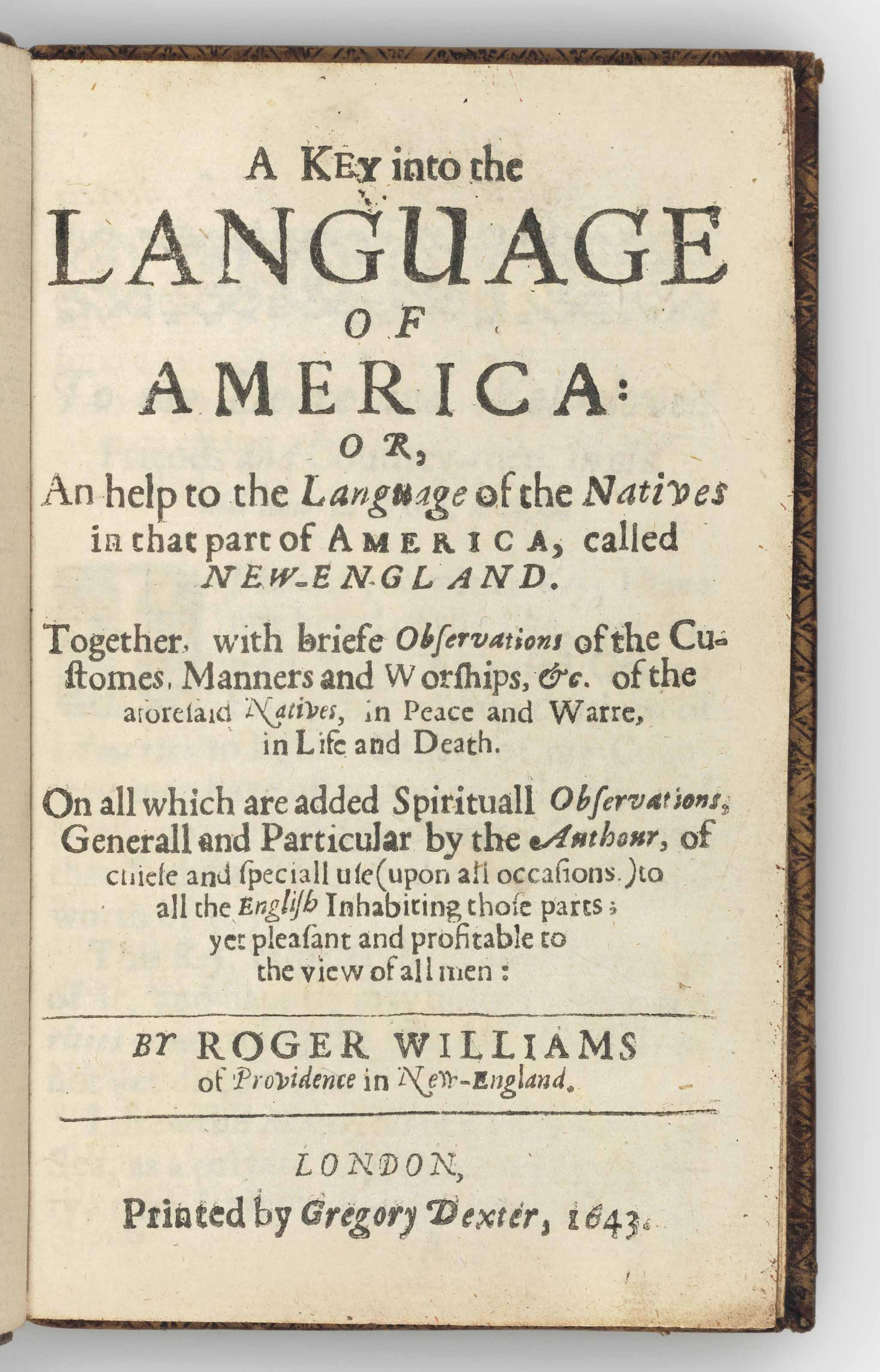
- Author: Roger Williams
- Publisher: Gregory Dexter
- Publication date: 1643

A Key into the Language of America or An help to the Language of the Natives in that part of America called New England is a book written by Roger Williams in 1643 describing the Native American languages in New England in the 17th century, largely Narragansett, an Algonquian language. The book is the first published colonial study of a Native American language in English.

Williams was one of the founders of the Colony of Rhode Island and an exile from the Massachusetts Bay Colony. The book was in part written to halt Massachusetts Bay's claims to Rhode Island's territory. Williams also argued against confiscating Indian land, arguing that the Indians had a right to payment. He had personally interacted with the Narragansett and the Wampanoag tribes as a missionary, friend, and trader, and he wrote favorably about elements of their culture. The book helped to introduce a number of American Indian loan words into the English lexicon.

== History ==
Author Roger Williams was a Puritan who was banished from the Massachusetts Bay Colony and founded Providence Plantations which grew into the Colony of Rhode Island. He believed that the King of England had no right to grant title to Indian land without paying for it. He interacted extensively with the Narragansett and the Wampanoag tribes as a missionary, friend, and trader. He extolled some elements of Indian culture as superior to European culture, and he wrote a complementary poem at the end of each chapter within the book.

According to J. Patrick Cesarini, Williams also published the book to rebut Massachusetts' distorted claims in New England's First Fruits (1643) about the first Indian conversions to Christianity (particularly that of Wequash Cooke, a Pequot in Connecticut Colony) and to thereby halt Massachusetts Bay's claims to Rhode Island's territory. Williams' friend Gregory Dexter printed the book in London, England, and the publication brought Williams much public attention.

== Notable words ==
The book helped to popularize and introduce numerous American Indian loan words into the English lexicon, including:

- Moccasin
- Moose
- Papoose
- Powwow
- Quahog
- Squash (askutasquash)
- Squaw
- Succotash

== See also ==
- The Bloudy Tenent of Persecution for Cause of Conscience
