= The Bloudy Tenent of Persecution for Cause of Conscience =

1644 book by Roger Williams

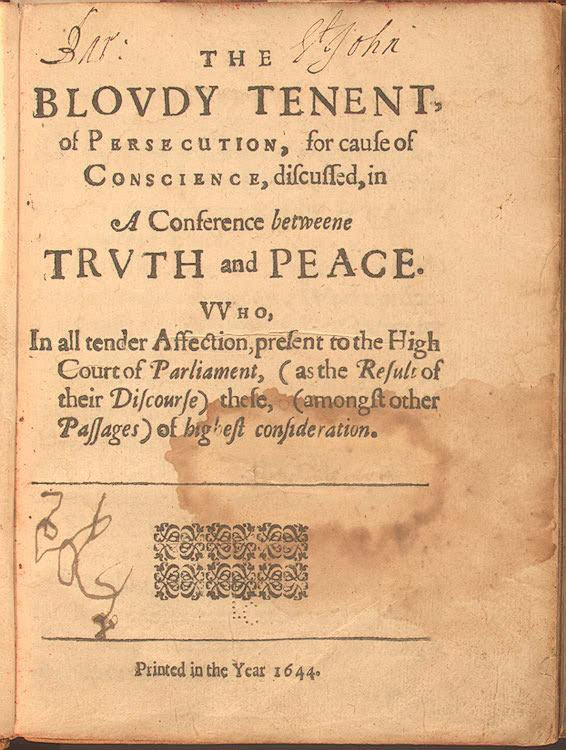
The Bloudy Tenent of Persecution, 1644

The Bloudy Tenent of Persecution, for Cause of Conscience, Discussed in a Conference between Truth and Peace is a 1644 book about government force written by Roger Williams, the co-founder of the English Colony of Rhode Island and Providence Plantations and the co-founder of the First Baptist Church in America. Tenent is an obsolete variant of tenet, and the book argues for a "wall of separation" between church and state and for state toleration of various Christian denominations, including Catholicism, and also "paganish, Jewish, Turkish or anti-Christian consciences and worships." The book takes the form of a dialogue between Truth and Peace and is a response to correspondence by Boston minister John Cotton regarding Cotton's support for state enforcement of religious uniformity in the Massachusetts Bay Colony. Williams argues that Christianity requires the existence of a separate civil authority which may not generally infringe upon liberty of conscience, which Williams interpreted to be a God-given right.

== Impact ==
The 1644 text is considered one of Williams' best-developed arguments, even though it was written under presumably rushed conditions and is stylistically difficult. Many of the original copies of The Bloudy Tenent were burned by order of a Parliamentary faction offended by his view of government. John Cotton responded to the book by defending his positions in The Bloudy Tenent, Washed, and Made White in the Bloud of the Lamb. Upon his return to London in 1652, Williams published a defense of his positions and responded to Cotton in The Bloudy Tenent Yet More Bloudy by Mr. Cotton's Endeavour to Wash it White in the Blood of the Lamb; of Whose Precious Blood, Spilt in the Bloud of his Servants; and of the Blood of Millions Spilt in Former and Later Wars for Conscience Sake, That Most Bloody Tenent of Persecution for Cause of Conscience, upon, a Second Tryal Is Found More Apparently and More Notoriously Guilty, etc. (London, 1652). The Bloudy Tenent has been cited as a philosophical source for John Locke, the First Amendment to the United States Constitution, and several writings of Thomas Jefferson regarding religious freedom.

== Biblical support for preventing governmental interference in religious matters ==
In the Bloudy Tenent and other writings, Williams interpreted many passages in the Old and New Testaments as limiting governmental interference in any religious matters, and therefore opposing the traditional Puritan exegesis which supported using state force in some religious matters:

- Williams believed that historic Israel was a unique covenant kingdom and the kings should be interpreted using typology. Therefore, the covenant kings were not appropriate government models for New Testament Christians, who believed that the Old Testament covenant had been fulfilled through Christ, as the ultimate king. Accordingly, Williams asserted that the more informative Old Testament examples of civil government were good non-covenant kings such as Artaxerxes, a pagan who gave the Hebrews freedom to worship in Ezra 7 but did not compel any kind of worship. For examples of bad kings, Williams mentioned Nebuchadnezzar in the Book of Daniel who oppressively forced the Jews (including Daniel, Shadrach, Meshach, and Abednego) to worship the state god or face death. Williams also used the example of Naboth's unjust execution in 1 Kings 21 as an example of a bad civil government abusing its religious power.
- Williams interpreted the Parable of the Tares in the Matthew 13:24–30,13:36–43 to support toleration of all of the "weeds", because civil persecution often inadvertently hurts the "wheat" (believers) too. He specifically defined the "weeds" as heretics who were clearly not Christians, such as Paul before his conversion, and not simply people with minor theological differences, as the Puritans asserted. Ultimately, he argued, it is God's duty to judge, not man's.
- Williams cited the legitimate role of government in Romans 13 as applying only to enforcement of the second table of the Ten Commandments—that is, the last five commandments involving hurting other people. He further cited Paul's letters in Ephesians 6:10–20, 2 Timothy 2, and 2 Corinthians 10 to explain how to use "spiritual weapons" rather than physical ones in dealing with unbelievers.
- Williams interpreted Revelation 2–3 to support the use of spiritual weapons rather than civil weapons, and pointed out that Christ's letters in these chapters were written to and applied to churches, not to civil governments. Williams interpreted Revelation 17's Beast of Revelation prophecy as representing all state churches that used governmental force to coerce political goals in the name of Christianity, including those in Europe and Massachusetts.

== See also ==
- A Key into the Language of America
- Christian debate on persecution and toleration
