= Succotash =

Traditional American food

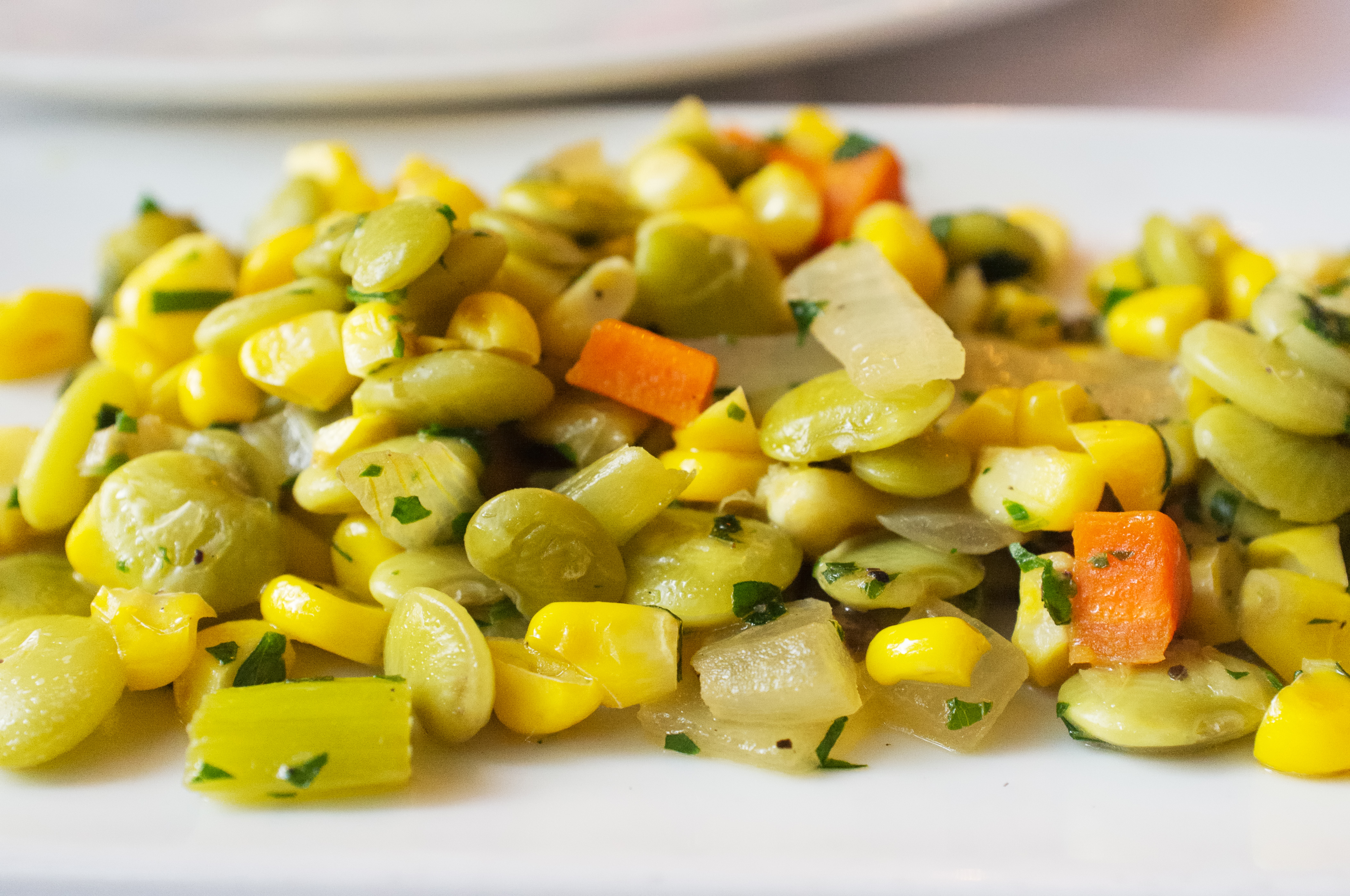
- Alternative names: Sohquttahhash
- Type: Vegetable dish
- Course: Main course
- Place of origin: United States and Canada
- Region or state: New England
- Created by: Narragansett
- Serving temperature: Hot
- Main ingredients: Sweet corn, lima beans, butter, salt, tomatoes, bell peppers, black pepper
- Variations: Can also be served with kidney beans
- Food energy (per serving): 100 kcal (420 kJ) (approximately)

Succotash is a North American vegetable dish consisting primarily of sweet corn with lima beans or other shell beans. The name succotash is derived from the Narragansett word sahquttahhash, which means "broken corn kernels". Other ingredients may be added, such as onions, potatoes, turnips, tomatoes, bell peppers, corned beef, salt pork, or okra.

== History ==
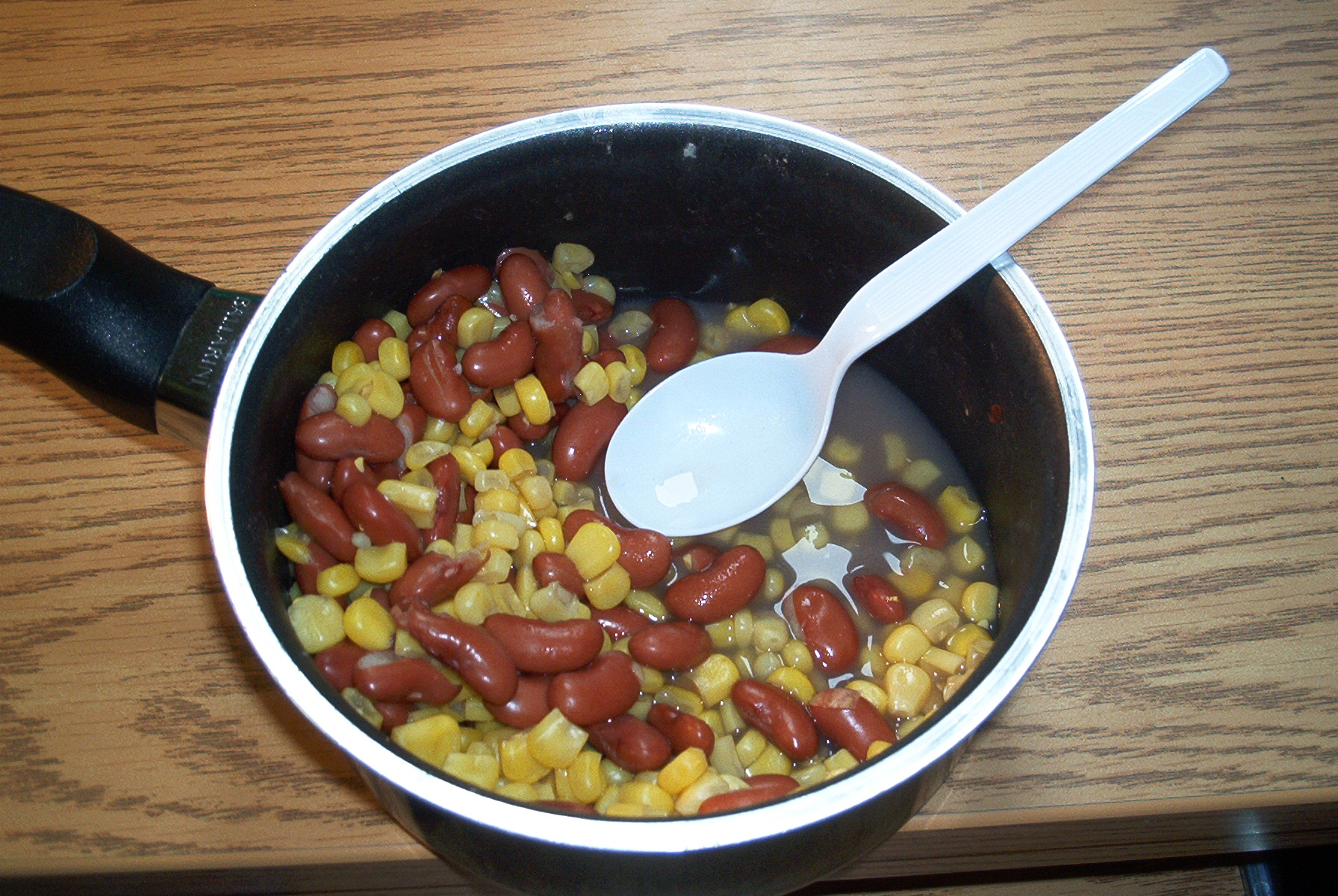
Succotash made with kidney beans, instead of lima beans

Succotash has a long history. It is believed to have been an invention of indigenous peoples in what is now known as New England, as corn and beans are two of the "Three Sisters" natives grew together - corn, beans, and squash - which thrived from their symbiotic cultivation. The practice was taught in the 1600s to early European settlers in the Plymouth and Massachusetts Bay Colonies.

By the 1760s English soldier and explorer Jonathan Carver indicated succotash was prepared by numerous tribes of midwestern North America:

One dish however, which answers nearly the same purpose as bread, is in use among the Ottagaumies, the Saukies, and the more eastern nations, where Indian corn grows, which is not only much esteemed by them, but it is reckoned extremely palatable by all the Europeans who enter their dominions. This is composed of their unripe corn as before described, and beans in the same state, boiled together with bears flesh, the fat of which moistens the pulse, and renders it beyond comparison delicious. They call this food Succatosh.

British colonists adapted the dish as a stew in the 17th century. Composed of ingredients unknown in Europe at the time, it gradually became a standard meal in the cuisine of New England and is a traditional dish of many Thanksgiving celebrations in the region, as well as in Pennsylvania and other states.

Because of the relatively inexpensive and more readily available ingredients, the dish was popular during the Great Depression in the United States. It was sometimes cooked in a casserole form, often with a light pie crust on top as in a traditional pot pie.

After the abolition of slavery in the United States, freed slaves in the American South returned to Africa and introduced the dish to the region.

== Preparation ==
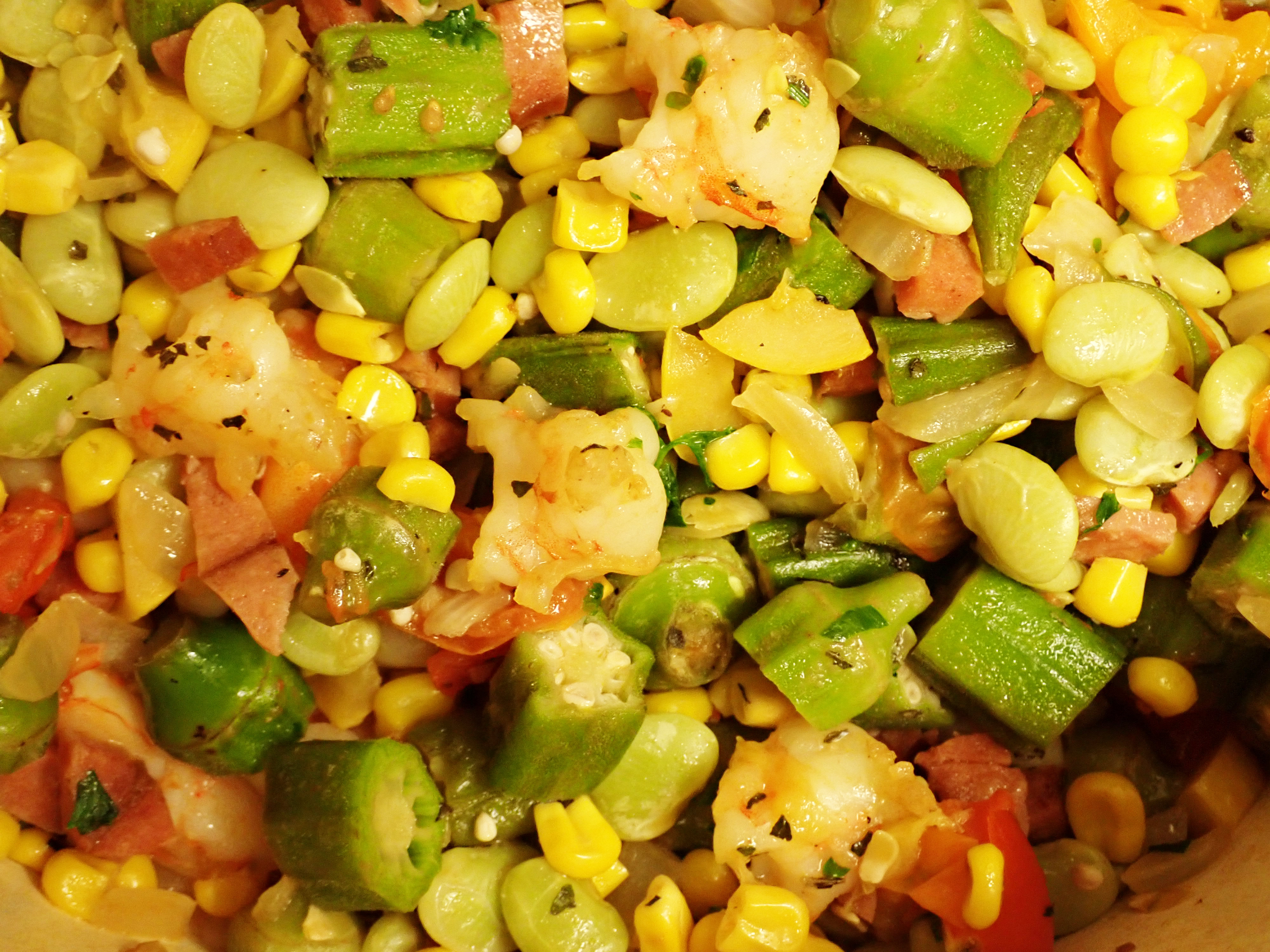
A "kitchen sink" succotash made with corn, lima beans, okra, andouille, shrimp, tomato, onion, garlic, and basil

Sweet corn (a form of maize), and shell bean, such as lima, are the base ingredients. Tomatoes, and peppers (all four mentioned ingredients being New World foods), are common additions.

Catherine Beecher's 19th-century recipe includes beans boiled with corn cobs from which the kernels have been removed. The kernels are added later, after the beans have boiled for several hours. The corn cobs are removed and the finished stew, in proportions of two parts corn to one part beans, is thickened with flour.

Henry Ward Beecher's recipe, published in an 1846 issue of Western Farmer and Gardner, adds salt pork, which he said is "an essential part of the affair."

== In popular culture ==
- Sylvester the Cat's trademark exclamation is "Thufferin' thuccotash!" Daffy Duck has also been known to use the line on occasion.
- Professional wrestler Roman Reigns infamously used the phrase "suffering succotash" during a promo on a 2015 episode of SmackDown.
- The Deee-Lite song "Groove is in the Heart" contains the line "My supper dish, my succotash wish"
- The Alien Ant Farm song “Wish” contains the line “make a wish, make a succotash wish”

== See also ==
- A Key into the Language of America
- List of legume dishes
- List of maize dishes
- List of regional dishes of the United States
- Umngqusho, a similar dish from Southern Africa
