= Roger Williams =

English Baptist minister, theologian, author, and founder of Rhode Island

The Reverend Roger Williams
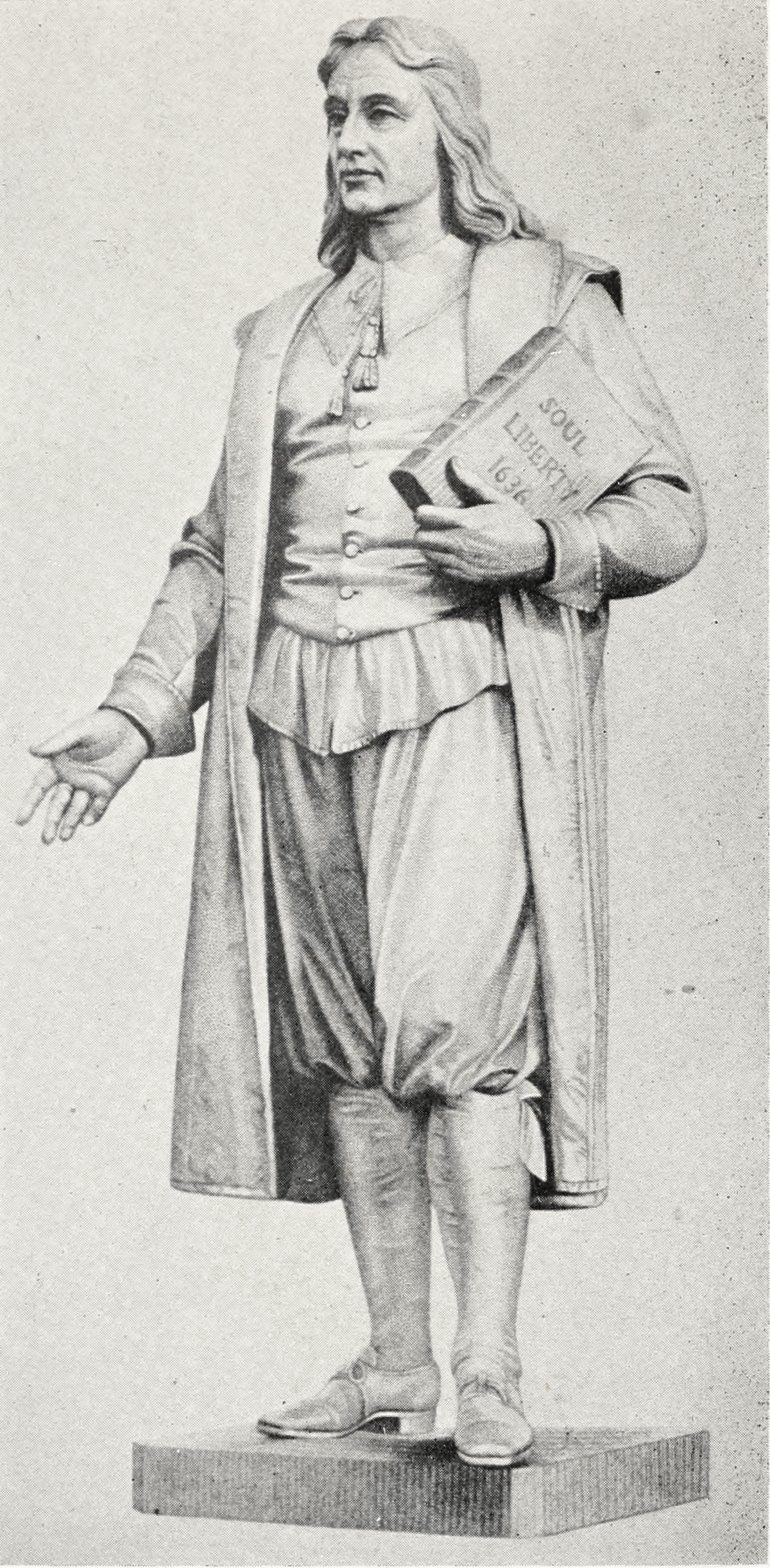
- Roger Williams (1872)

9th President of the Colony of Rhode Island and Providence Plantations
- In office 1654–1657
- Preceded by: Nicholas Easton
- Succeeded by: Benedict Arnold

Chief Officer of Providence and Warwick
- In office 1644–1647
- Preceded by: Himself (as Governor)
- Succeeded by: John Coggeshall (as President)

Governor of Providence Plantations
- In office 1636–1644
- Preceded by: position established
- Succeeded by: Himself (as Chief Officer)

Personal details
- Born: c. 1603 London, England
- Died: between 21 January and 15 March 1683 (aged 79) Providence Plantations
- Spouse: Mary Bernard
- Children: 6
- Education: Pembroke College, Cambridge
- Occupation: minister, statesman, author

Roger Williams (c. 1603 – March 1683) was an English-born New England minister, theologian, author, and founder of the Providence Plantations, which became the Colony of Rhode Island and Providence Plantations and later the State of Rhode Island. He was a staunch advocate for religious liberty, separation of church and state, and fair dealings with the Native Americans.

Initially a Puritan minister, his beliefs evolved and he questioned the authority of the Puritan church in enforcing religious conformity. He was expelled by the Puritan leaders from the Massachusetts Bay Colony, and he established Providence Plantations in 1636 as a refuge offering what he termed "liberty of conscience" making Rhode Island the first government in the Western world to guarantee religious freedom in its founding charter. His ideas on religious tolerance and civil government directly influenced the principles later enshrined in the First Amendment of the U.S. Constitution. He briefly became a Baptist, and in 1638 he founded the First Baptist Church in America in Providence. He then moved beyond organized religion, becoming a "seeker" who did not identify with any specific church. Williams studied the language of the New England Native Americans and published the first book-length study of it in English.

Today, Williams's legacy continues to shape debates on religious liberty and the role of government in matters of conscience, with his writings cited in legal arguments and Supreme Court decisions on the separation of church and state.

== Early life ==
Roger Williams was born in London, and many historians cite 1603 as the probable year of his birth. His birth records were destroyed when St. Sepulchre Church burned during the Great Fire of London in 1666, and his entry in American National Biography notes that Williams gave contradictory information about his age throughout his life. His father was James Williams (1562–1620), a merchant tailor in Smithfield, and his mother was Alice Pemberton (1564–1635).

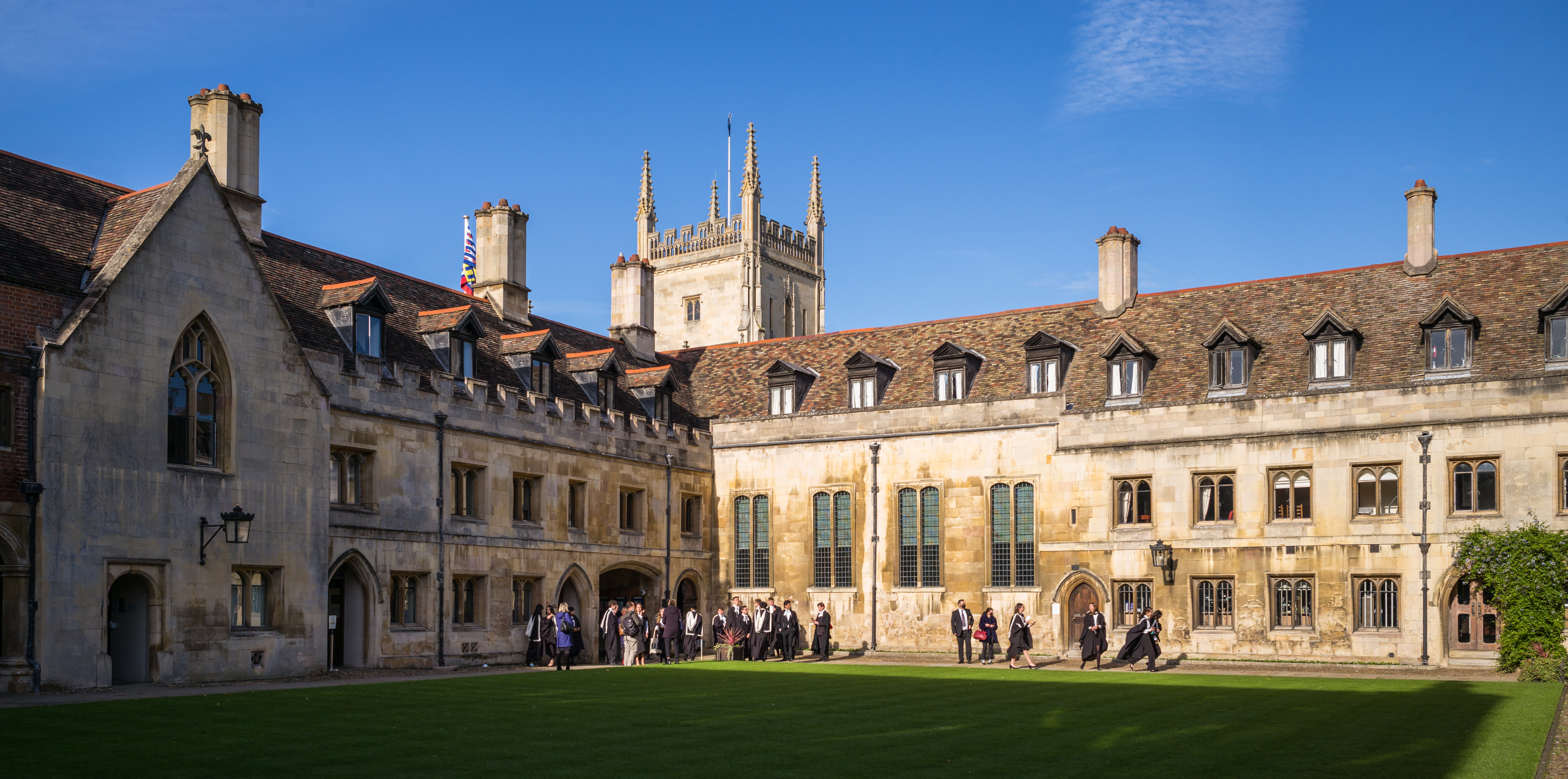
Williams attended Pembroke College, Cambridge

At an early age, Williams had a spiritual conversion of which his father disapproved. As an adolescent, he apprenticed under Sir Edward Coke (1552–1634), the famous jurist, and was educated at Charterhouse School under Coke's patronage. Williams later attended Pembroke College, Cambridge, where he received a Bachelor of Arts in 1627. He demonstrated a facility with languages, acquiring familiarity with Latin, Hebrew, Greek, Dutch, and French at an early age. Years later, he tutored John Milton in Dutch and Native American languages in exchange for refresher lessons in Hebrew and Greek.

Williams took holy orders in the Church of England in connection with his studies, but he became a Puritan at Cambridge and thus ruined his chance for preferment in the Anglican Church. After graduating from Cambridge, he became the chaplain to Sir William Masham. In April 1629, Williams proposed marriage to Jane Whalley, the niece of Lady Barrington, but she declined. Later that year, he married Mary Bernard (1609–76), the daughter of Rev. Richard Bernard, a notable Puritan preacher and author; they were married at the Church of High Laver in Essex, around 20 miles north-east of London. They had six children, all born in America: Mary, Freeborn, Providence, Mercy, Daniel, and Joseph.

Williams knew that Puritan leaders planned to emigrate to the New World. He did not join the first wave of settlers, but later decided that he could not remain in England under the administration of Archbishop William Laud. Williams regarded the Church of England as corrupt and false, and he had arrived at the Separatist position by 1630; on December 1, he and his wife boarded the Boston-bound Lyon in Bristol.

== First years in America ==
=== Arrival in Boston ===
On February 5, 1631, the Lyon anchored in Nantasket outside of Boston. The church of Boston offered Williams the opportunity to serve during the vacancy of Rev. John Wilson, who had returned to England to bring his wife back to America. Williams declined the position on grounds that it was "an unseparated church". In addition, he asserted that civil magistrates must not punish any sort of "breach of the first table" of the Ten Commandments such as idolatry, Sabbath-breaking, false worship, and blasphemy, and that individuals should be free to follow their own convictions in religious matters. These three principles later became central tenets of Williams's teachings and writings.

=== Salem and Plymouth ===
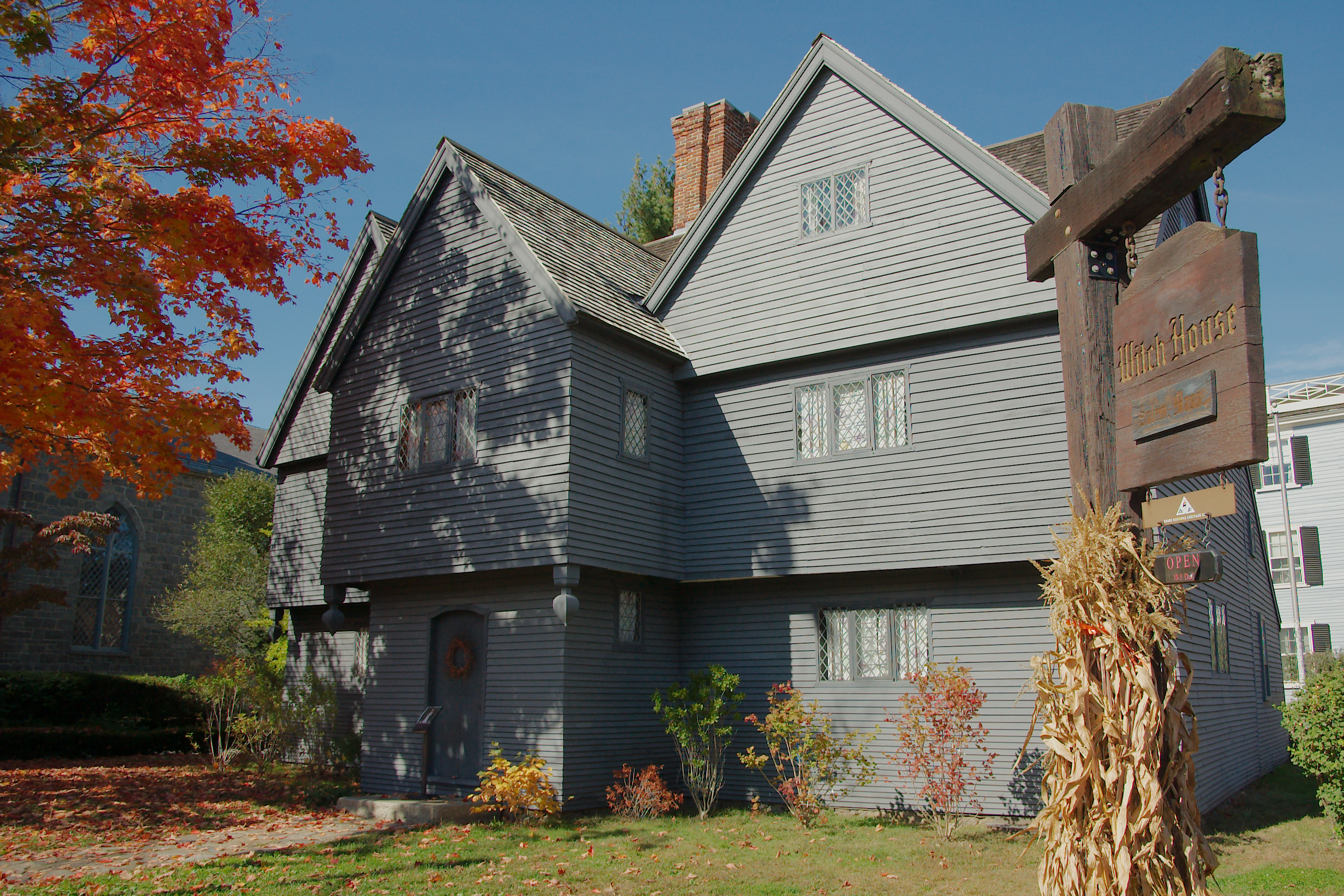
The Jonathan Corwin House was long purported to be Williams's residence in Salem

As a Separatist, Williams considered the Church of England irredeemably corrupt and believed that one must completely separate from it to establish a new church for the true and pure worship of God. The Salem church was also inclined to Separatism, and they invited him to become their teacher. In response, leaders in Boston vigorously protested, leading Salem to withdraw its offer. As the summer of 1631 ended, Williams moved to Plymouth Colony where he was welcomed, and informally assisted the minister. At Plymouth, he regularly preached. Plymouth Governor William Bradford wrote that "his teachings were well approved".

Some time later, Williams decided that the Plymouth church was not sufficiently separated from the Church of England. Furthermore, his contact with the Narragansett Native Americans had caused him to question the validity of colonial charters that did not include legitimate purchase of Native American land. Governor Bradford later wrote that Williams fell "into some strange opinions which caused some controversy between the church and him".

In December 1632, Williams wrote a lengthy tract that openly condemned the King's charters and questioned the right of Plymouth to the land without first buying it from the Native Americans. He even charged that King James had uttered a "solemn lie" in claiming that he was the first Christian monarch to have discovered the land. Williams moved back to Salem by the fall of 1633 and was welcomed by Rev. Samuel Skelton as an unofficial assistant. Williams soon found himself in disagreement with the authority of one of the new ecclesiastical clergy who were consolidating their control over the churches.

=== Litigation and exile ===
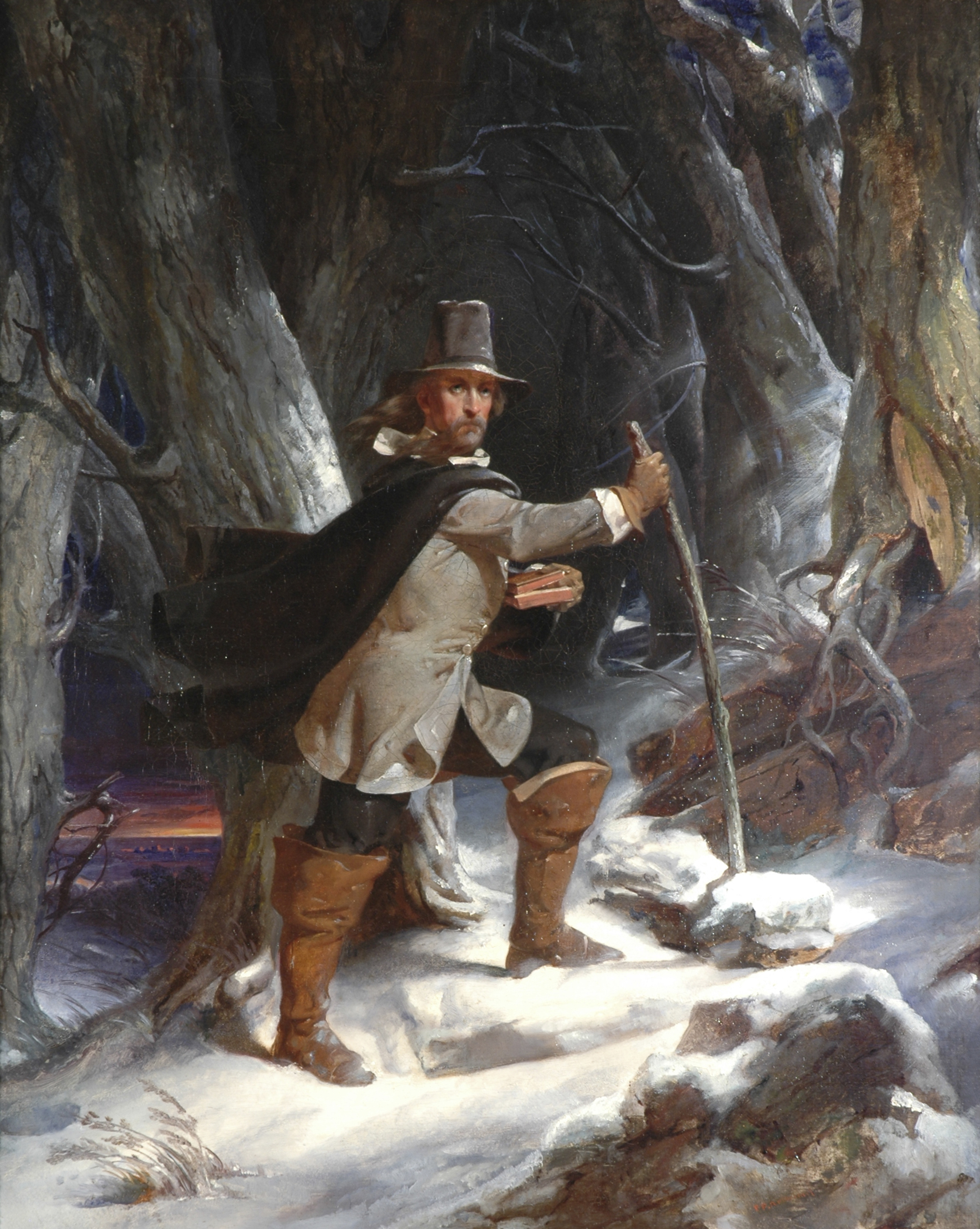
The Banishment of Roger Williams (c. 1850) by Peter F. Rothermel

The Massachusetts Bay authorities were not pleased at Williams's return. In December 1633, they summoned him to appear before the General Court in Boston to defend his tract attacking the King and the charter. The issue was smoothed out, and the tract disappeared forever, probably burned. In August 1634, Williams became acting pastor of the Salem church, the Rev. Skelton having died. In March 1635, he was again ordered to appear before the General Court, and he was summoned yet again for the Court's July term to answer for "erroneous" and "dangerous opinions". The Court finally ordered that he be removed from his church position.

This latest controversy welled up as the town of Salem petitioned the General Court to annex some land on Marblehead Neck. The Court refused to consider the request unless the church in Salem removed Williams. The church felt that this order violated their independence, and sent a letter of protest to the other churches. However, the letter was not read publicly in those churches, and the General Court refused to seat the delegates from Salem at the next session. Support for Williams began to wane under this pressure, and he withdrew from the church and began meeting with a few of his most ardent followers in his home.

Finally, the General Court tried Williams in October 1635 and convicted him of sedition and heresy. They declared that he was spreading "diverse, new, and dangerous opinions" and ordered that he be banished. The execution of the order was delayed because Williams was ill and winter was approaching, so he was allowed to stay temporarily, provided that he ceased publicly teaching his opinions. He did not comply with this demand, and the sheriff came in January 1636, only to discover that he had slipped away three days earlier during a blizzard. He traveled 55 miles on foot through the deep snow, from Salem to Raynham, Massachusetts, where the local Wampanoags offered him shelter at their winter camp. Sachem Massasoit hosted Williams there for the three months until spring.

== Settlement at Providence ==
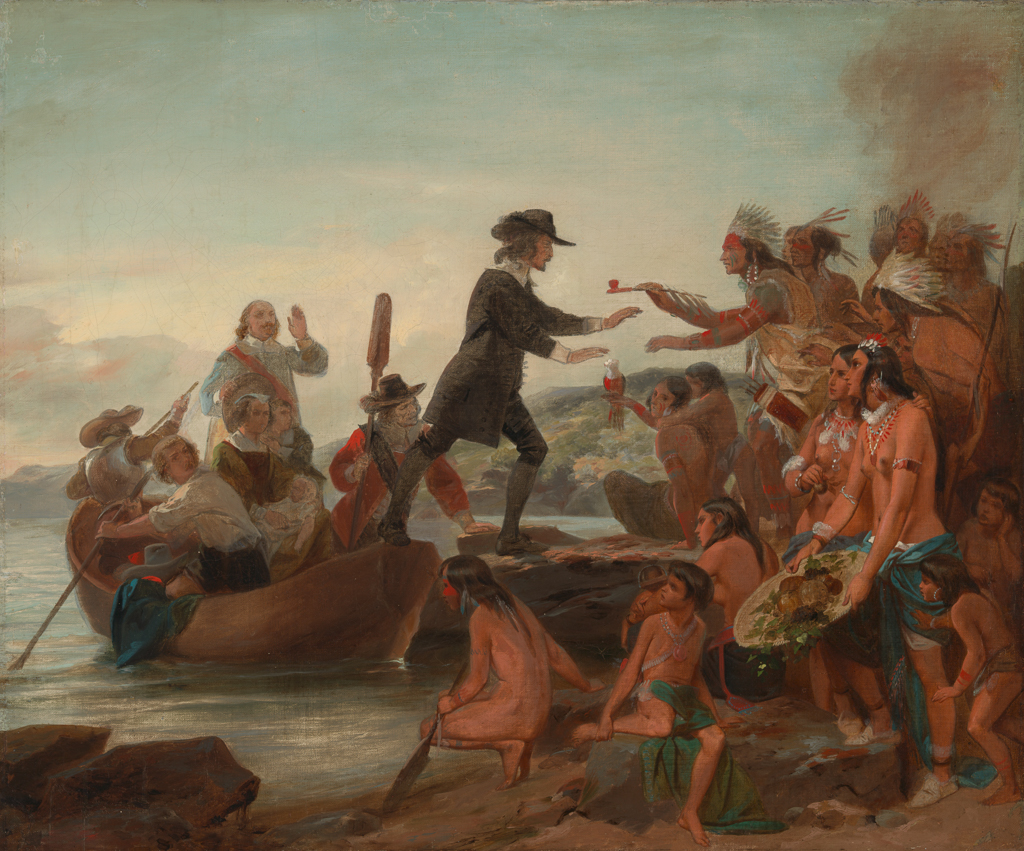
The Landing of Roger Williams in 1636 (1857) by Alonzo Chappel depicts Williams crossing the Seekonk River

In the spring of 1636, Williams and four companions began a new settlement on land which he had bought from Massasoit in Rumford. After settling, however, Plymouth Governor William Bradford sent him a friendly letter which nonetheless warned him that he was still within jurisdiction of Plymouth Colony and concerned that this might antagonize the leaders in Boston.

Accordingly, Williams and his companions crossed the Seekonk River in search of a new location suitable for settlement. Upon reaching the shore, they were met by Narragansett people who greeted them with the words "What cheer, Netop" (transl. Hello, friend). The settlers then continued westward along the Providence River, where they encountered a cove and freshwater spring. Finding the area suitable for settlement, Williams acquired the tract from sachems Canonicus and Miantonomi. Here, Williams and his followers established a new, permanent settlement, convinced that divine providence had brought them there. They named it Providence Plantations.

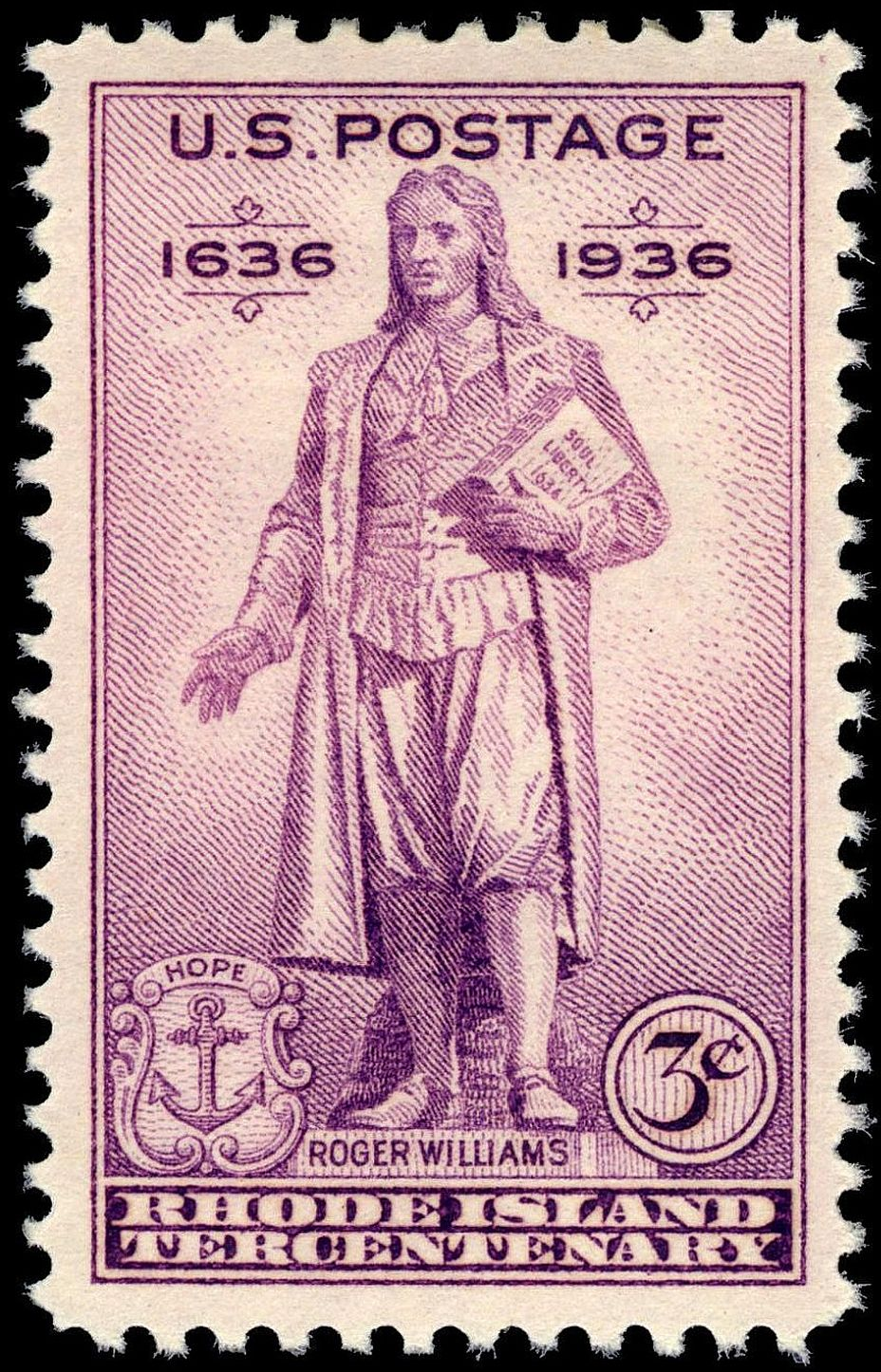
In 1936, on the 300th anniversary of the settlement of Rhode Island in 1636, the U.S. Post Office issued a commemorative stamp, depicting Roger Williams

Williams wanted his settlement to be a haven for those "distressed of conscience", and it soon attracted a growing number of families who did not see eye-to-eye with the leaders in Massachusetts Bay. From the beginning, a majority vote of the heads of households governed the new settlement, but only in civil things. Newcomers could also be admitted to full citizenship by a majority vote. In August 1637 the Providence Civil Compact formally restricted the government to civil things. In 1640 this was superseded by the Providence Combination, signed by 39 freemen (men who had full citizenship and voting rights) who declared their determination "still to hold forth liberty of conscience". Thus, Williams founded the first place in modern history where citizenship and religion were separate, providing religious liberty and separation of church and state. This was combined with the principle of majoritarian democracy.

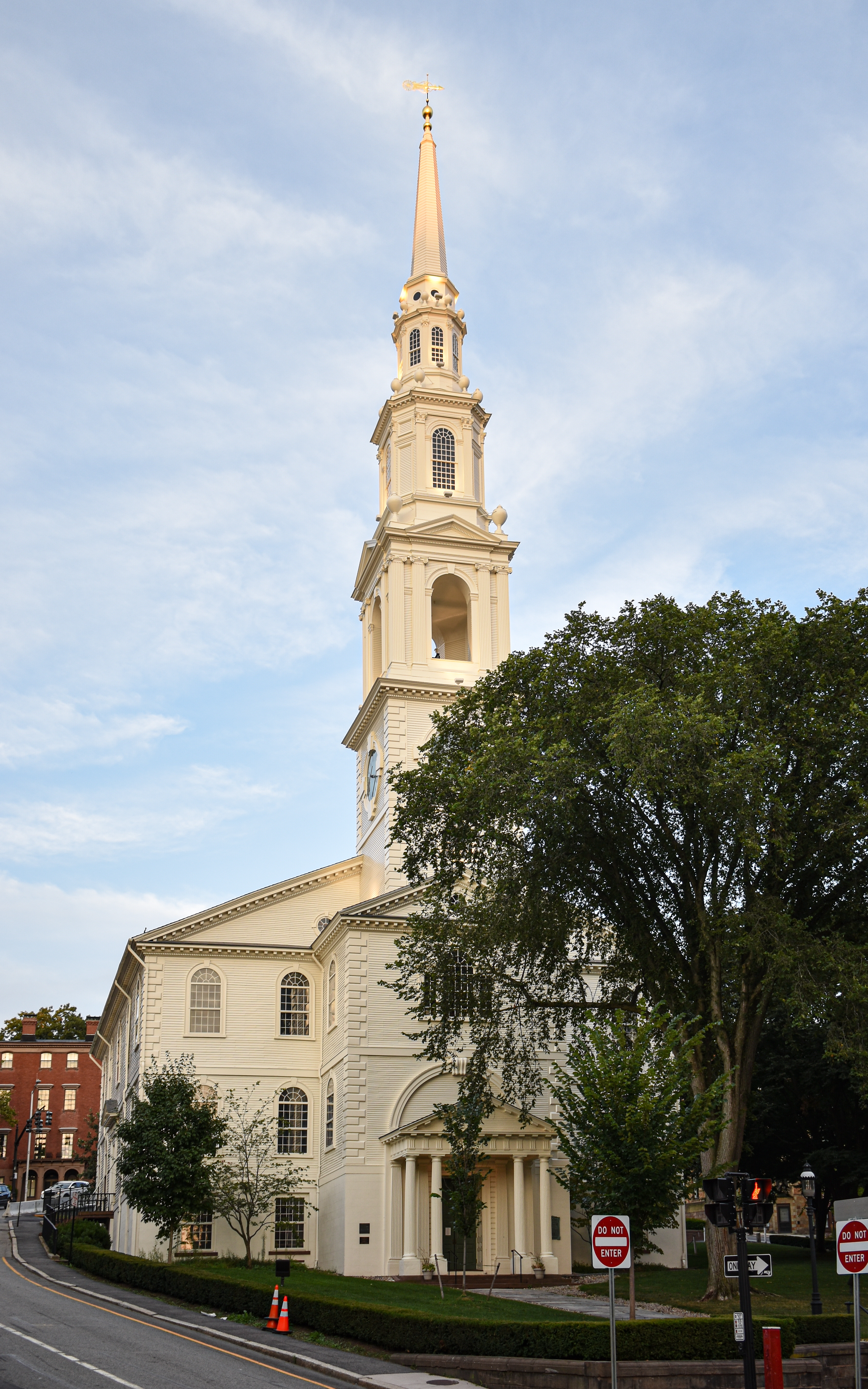
First Baptist Church in America which Williams co-founded in 1638

In November 1637, the General Court of Massachusetts exiled a number of families during the Antinomian Controversy, including Anne Hutchinson and her followers. John Clarke was among them, and he learned from Williams that Aquidneck Island might be purchased from the Narragansetts; Williams helped him to make the purchase, along with William Coddington and others, and they established the settlement of Portsmouth. In spring 1638, some of those settlers split away and founded the nearby settlement of Newport, also situated on Rhode Island (now called Aquidneck).

In 1638, Williams and about 12 others were baptized and formed a congregation. Today, Williams's congregation is recognized as the First Baptist Church in America.

=== Pequot War and relations with Native Americans ===
In the meantime, the Pequot War had broken out. Massachusetts Bay asked for Williams's help, which he gave despite his exile, and he became the Bay colony's eyes and ears, and also dissuaded the Narragansetts from joining with the Pequots. Instead, the Narragansetts allied themselves with the colonists and helped to defeat the Pequots in 1637–38.

Williams formed firm friendships and developed deep trust among the Native American tribes, especially the Narragansetts. He was able to keep the peace between the Native Americans and the Colony of Rhode Island and Providence Plantations for nearly 40 years by his constant mediation and negotiation. He twice surrendered himself as a hostage to the Native Americans to guarantee the safe return of a great sachem from a summons to a court: Pessicus in 1645 and Metacom ("King Philip") in 1671. The Native Americans trusted Williams more than any other Colonist, and he proved trustworthy.

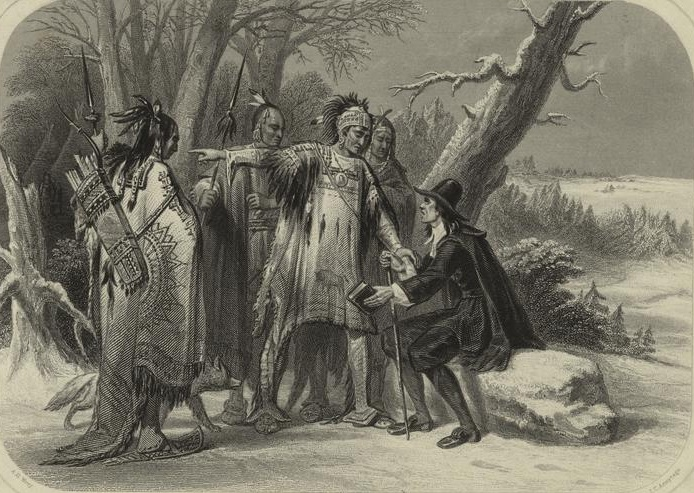
A mid-19th century depiction of Williams meeting with Narragansett leaders

== Securing Charters ==
Williams arrived in London in the midst of the English Civil War. Puritans held power in London, and he was able to obtain a charter through the offices of Sir Henry Vane the Younger despite strenuous opposition from Massachusetts's agents. His book A Key into the Language of America proved crucial to the success of his charter, albeit indirectly. It was published in 1643 in London and combined a phrase-book with observations about life and culture as an aid to communicate with the Native Americans of New England. It covered everything from salutations to death and burial. Williams also sought to correct the attitudes of superiority displayed by the colonists towards Native Americans:

Boast not proud English, of thy birth & blood;

Thy brother Indian is by birth as Good. Of one blood God made Him, and Thee and All,

As wise, as fair, as strong, as personal.

Gregory Dexter printed the book, which was the first book-length study of a Native American language. In England, it was well received by readers who were curious about the Native American tribes of the New World.

Williams secured his charter from Parliament for Providence Plantations in July 1644, after which he published his most famous book The Bloudy Tenent of Persecution for Cause of Conscience. The publication produced a great uproar; between 1644 and 1649, at least 60 pamphlets were published addressing the work's arguments. Parliament responded to Williams on August 9, 1644, by ordering the public hangman to burn all copies. By this time, however, Williams was already on his way back to New England where he arrived with his charter in September.

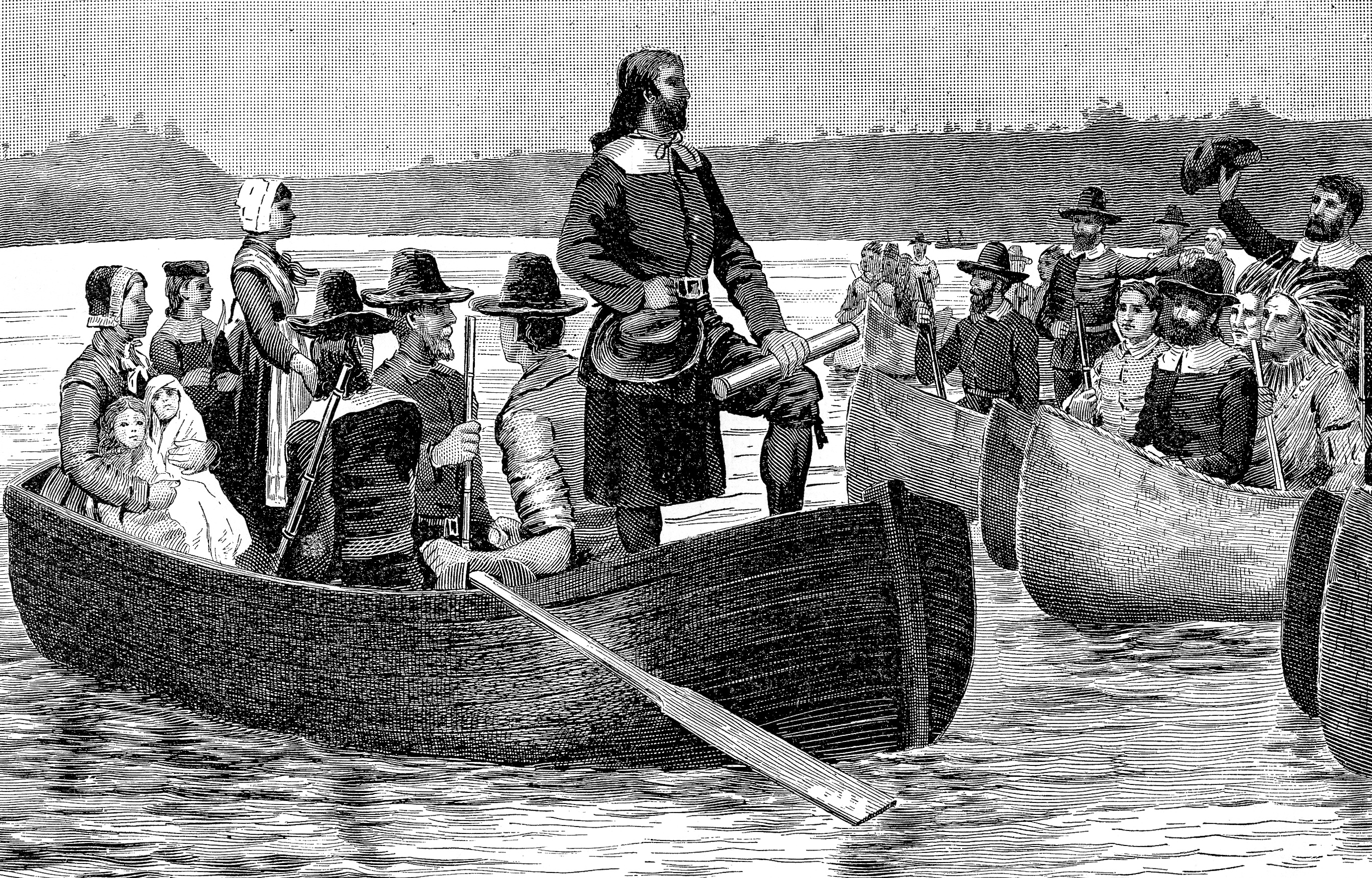
Return of Roger Williams from England with the First Charter from Parliament for Providence Plantations in July 1644

It took Williams several years to unify the settlements of Narragansett Bay under a single government, given the opposition of William Coddington. The settlements of Providence, Portsmouth, Newport, and Warwick finally united in 1647 into the Colony of Rhode Island and Providence Plantations. Freedom of conscience was again proclaimed, and the colony became a safe haven for people who were persecuted for their beliefs, including Baptists, Quakers, and Jews. However, Coddington disliked Williams and did not enjoy his position of subordination under the new charter government. He sailed to England and returned to Rhode Island in 1651 with his own patent making him "Governor for Life" over Rhode Island and Conanicut Island.

As a result, Providence, Warwick, and Coddington's opponents on the island dispatched Williams and John Clarke to England, seeking to cancel Coddington's commission. Williams sold his trading post at Cocumscussoc (near Wickford, Rhode Island) to pay for his journey even though it had provided his primary source of income. He and Clarke succeeded in rescinding Coddington's patent, with Clarke remaining in England for the following decade to protect the colonists' interests and secure a new charter.

=== Slavery ===
Williams did not write extensively about slavery. He consistently expressed disapproval of it, though generally he did not object to the enslavement of captured enemy combatants for a fixed duration, a practice that was the normal course of warfare in that time. Williams struggled with the morality of slavery and raised his concerns in letters to Massachusetts Bay Governor John Winthrop concerning the treatment of the Pequots during the Pequot War (1636–1638). In these letters, he requested Winthrop to prevent the enslavement of Pequot women and children, as well as to direct the colonial militia to spare them during the fighting. In another letter to Winthrop written on July 31, 1637, Williams conceded that the capture and indenture of remaining Pequot women and children would "lawfully" ensure that remaining enemy combatants were "weakned and despoild", but pleaded that their indenture not be permanent.

Despite his reservations, Williams formed part of the colonial delegation sent to conduct negotiations at the end of the Pequot War, where the fates of the captured Pequots were decided upon between the colonists of New England and their Native American allies the Narragansetts, Mohegans, and Niantics. Williams reported to Winthrop that he and Narragansett sachem Miantonomoh discussed what to do with a group of captured Pequots; initially they discussed the possibility of distributing them as slaves among the four victorious parties, which Miantonomoh "liked well", though at Williams's suggestion, the non-combatants were relocated to an island in Niantic territory "because most of them were families". Miantonomoh later requested an enslaved female Pequot from Winthrop, to which Williams objected, stating that "he had his share sent to him". Instead, Williams suggested that he "buy one or two of some English man".

In July 1637, Winthrop gave Williams a Pequot boy as an indentured servant. The child had been captured by Israel Stoughton in Connecticut. Williams renamed the child "Will".

Some of the Native American allies aided in the export of enslaved Pequots to the West Indies, while others disagreed with the practice, believing that they should have been given land and provisions to contribute to the wellbeing of colonial settlements. Many enslaved Pequots frequently ran away, where they were taken in by surrounding Native American settlements. Williams aided colonists in distributing and selling Pequot captives and fielded requests from colonists to track down and return runaways, using his connections with Miantonomoh, Ayanemo, and other Native leaders to find escapees. Williams recorded experiences of abuse and rape recounted by the Natives he apprehended, and Margaret Ellen Newell speculates that Williams's letters encouraging Winthrop to limit terms of servitude were informed by his acquaintance with escapees.

In 1641, the Massachusetts Bay Colony passed laws sanctioning slavery. In response, under Williams's leadership, Providence Plantations passed a law in 1652 restricting the amount of time for which an individual could be held in servitude and tried to prevent the importation of slaves from Africa. The law established terms for slavery that mirrored that of indentured servitude; enslavement was to be limited in duration and not passed down to children. Upon the unification of the mainland and island settlements, residents of the island refused to accept this law, ensuring that it became dead legislation.

Tensions escalated with the Narragansetts during King Philip's War, despite Williams's efforts to maintain peace, during which his home was burned to the ground. During the war, Williams led the committee responsible for processing and selling Rhode Island's Native American captives into slavery. Williams's committee recommended that Providence allow residents to keep Native American slaves in spite of earlier municipal statutes. The committee appraised the prices of various Native American captives and brokered their sale to residents. Williams's son transported additional captives to be sold in Newport. Williams also organized the trial and execution of a captured Native American man who had been a ring leader in the war.

== Relations with the Baptists ==
Ezekiel Holliman baptized Williams in late 1638. A few years later, Dr. John Clarke established the First Baptist Church in Newport, Rhode Island, and both Roger Williams and John Clarke became the founders of the Baptist faith in America. Williams did not affiliate himself with any church, but he remained interested in the Baptists, agreeing with their rejection of infant baptism and most other matters. Both enemies and admirers sometimes called him a "Seeker", associating him with a heretical movement that accepted Socinianism and Universal Reconciliation, but Williams rejected both of these ideas.

== King Philip's War ==
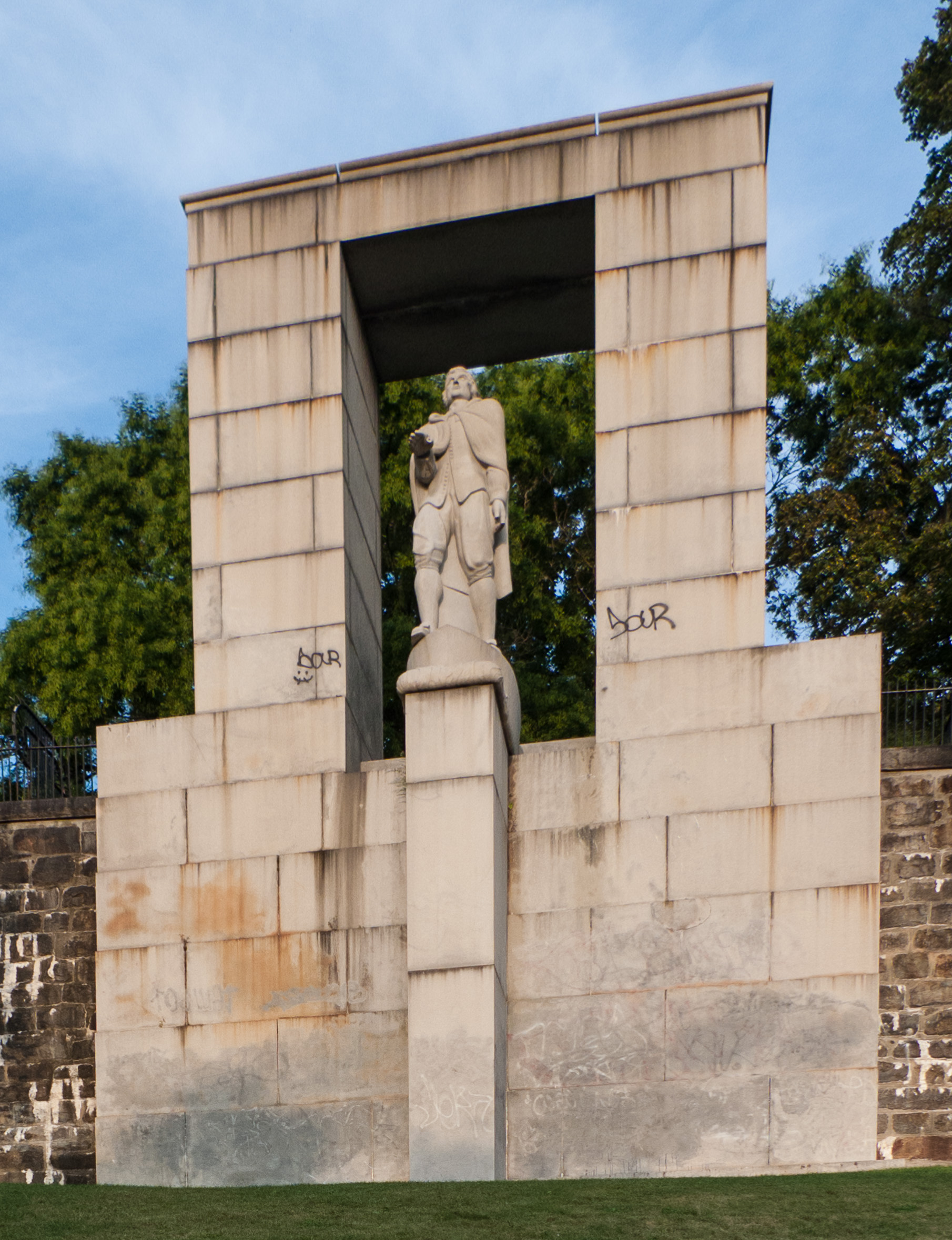
Williams's final resting place in Prospect Terrace Park

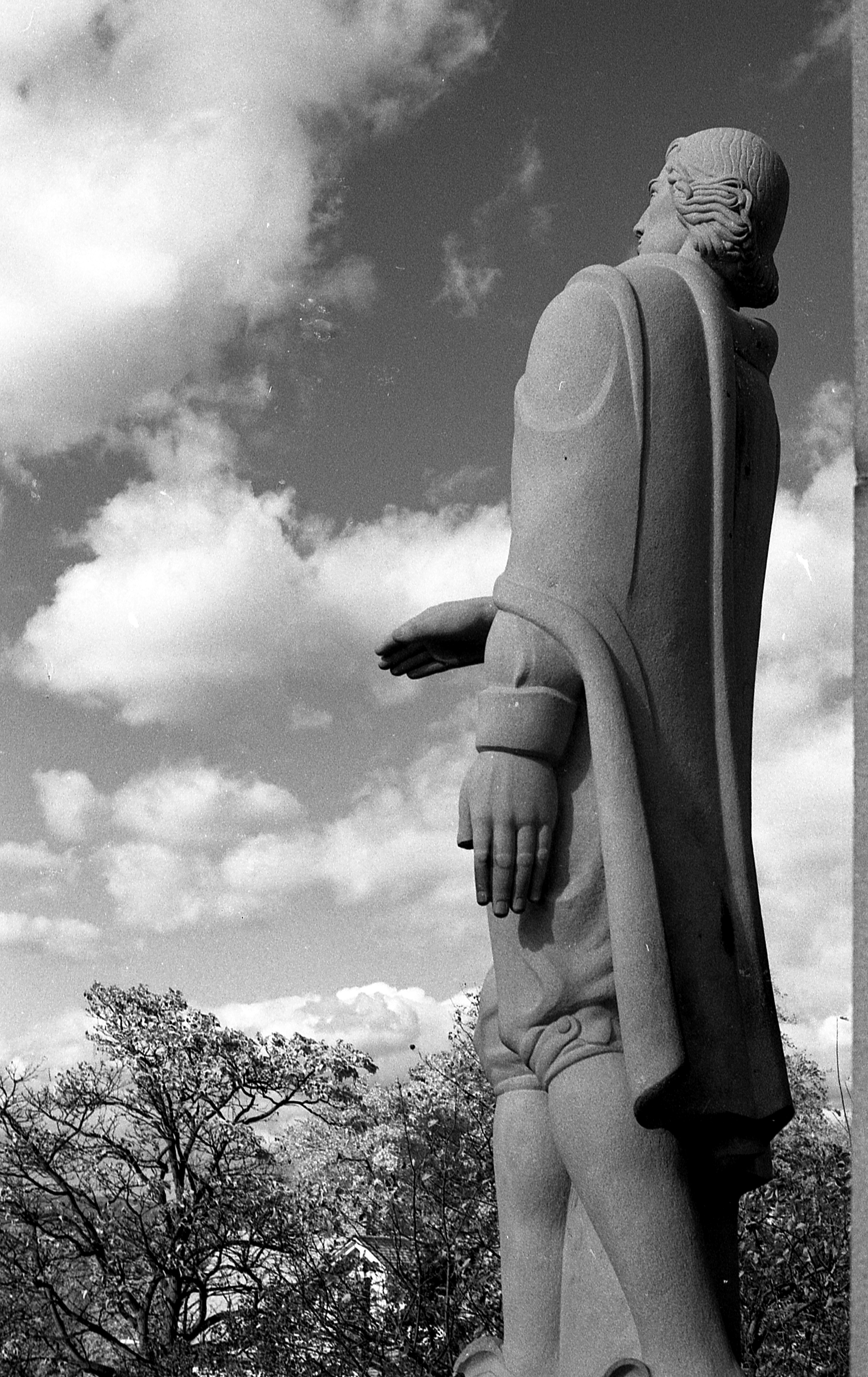
Side view (1974).

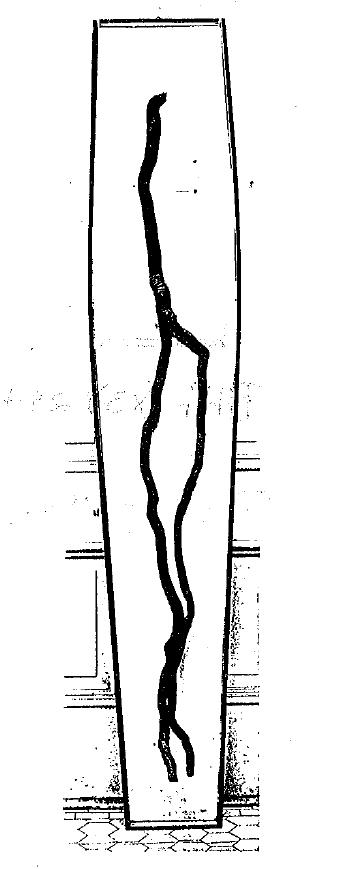
The "Roger Williams Root"

King Philip's War (1675–1676) pitted the colonists against the Wampanoags, along with some of the Narragansetts with whom Williams had previously maintained good relations. Williams was elected captain of Providence's militia, even though he was in his 70s. On March 29, 1676, Narragansetts led by Canonchet burned Providence; nearly the entire town was destroyed, including Williams's home.

== Death and memorialization ==
The recovered remains of Roger Williams being moved for reburial beneath his statue in Prospect Terrace, 1933.

Williams died sometime between January 16 and March 16, 1683 and was buried on his own property. Fifty years later, his house collapsed into the cellar and the location of his grave was forgotten.

Providence residents were determined to raise a monument in his honor in 1860; they "dug up the spot where they believed the remains to be, they found only nails, teeth, and bone fragments. They also found an apple tree root", which they thought followed the shape of a human body; the root followed the shape of a spine, split at the hips, bent at the knees, and turned up at the feet.

The Rhode Island Historical Society has cared for this tree root since 1860 as representative of Rhode Island's founder. Since 2007, the root has been displayed at the John Brown House.

The few remains discovered alongside the root were initially reburied in the tomb of his descendent, before being reinterred in Prospect Terrace Park in 1939 at the base of a large stone monument. The so-called "Williams Root" is preserved and is now on display at the John Brown House Museum on the East Side of Providence.

== Separation of church and state ==
Williams was a staunch advocate of the separation of church and state. He was convinced that civil government had no basis for meddling in matters of religious belief. He declared that the state should concern itself only with matters of civil order, not with religious belief, and he rejected any attempt by civil authorities to enforce the "first Table" of the Ten Commandments, those commandments that deal with an individual's relationship with and belief in God. Williams believed that the state must confine itself to the commandments dealing with the relations between people: murder, theft, adultery, lying, honoring parents, etc. He wrote of a "hedge or wall of Separation between the Garden of the Church and the Wilderness of the world". Thomas Jefferson later used the metaphor in his 1801 Letter to Danbury Baptists.

Williams considered the state's sponsorship of religious beliefs or practice to be "forced worship", declaring "Forced worship stinks in God's nostrils." He also believed Constantine the Great to be a worse enemy to Christianity than Nero because the subsequent state involvement in religious matters corrupted Christianity and led to the death of the first Christian church and the first Christian communities. He described laws concerning an individual's religious beliefs as "rape of the soul" and spoke of the "oceans of blood" shed as a result of trying to command conformity. The moral principles in the Scriptures ought to guide civil magistrates, he believed, but he observed that well-ordered, just, and civil governments existed even where Christianity was not present. Thus, all governments had to maintain civil order and justice, but Williams decided that none had a warrant to promote or repress any religious views.

== Writings ==
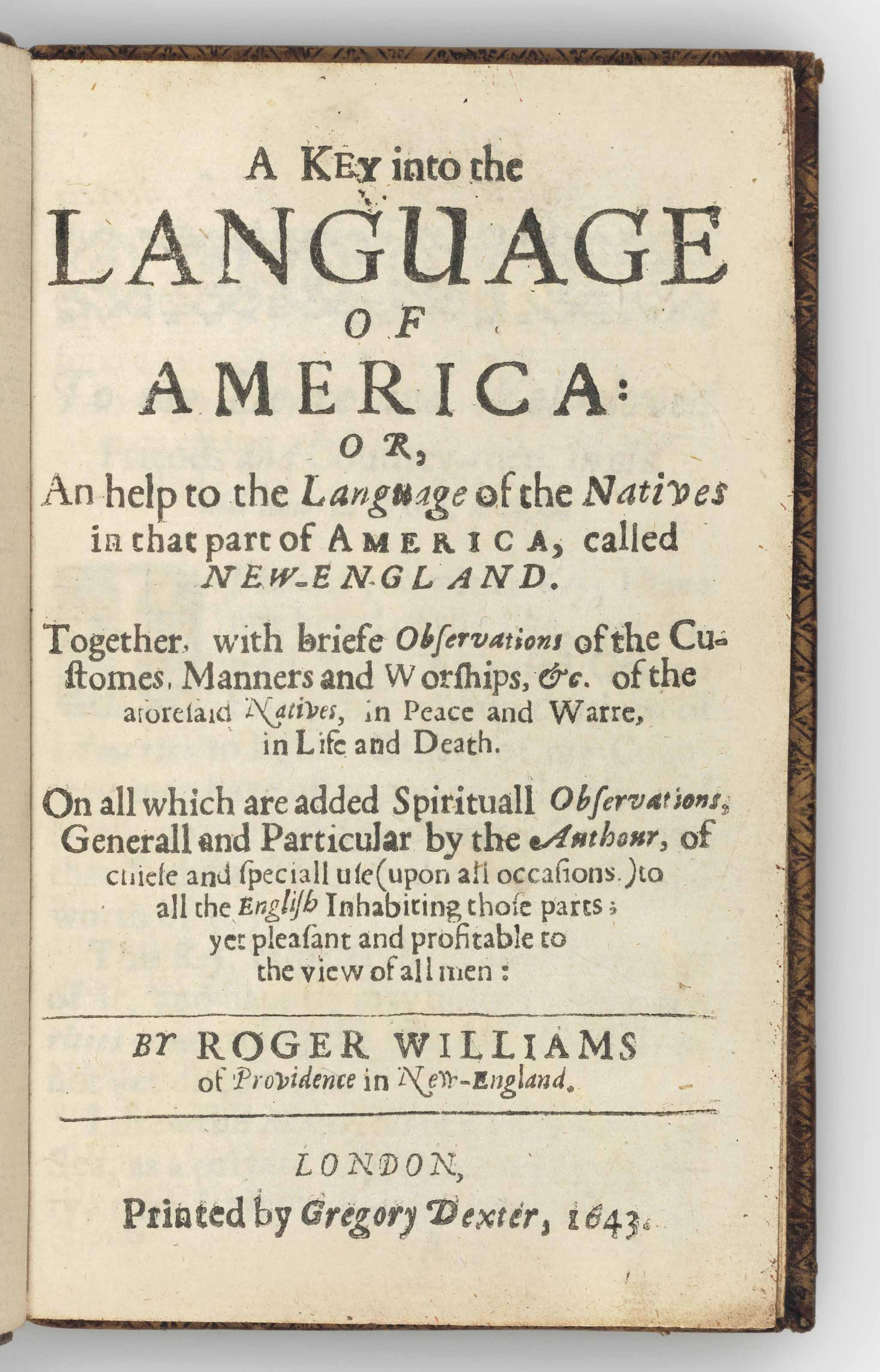
In 1643, Williams published A Key into the Language of America, the first published study of a Native American language.

Williams's career as an author began with A Key into the Language of America (London, 1643), written during his first voyage to England. His next publication was Mr. Cotton's Letter lately Printed, Examined and Answered (London, 1644; reprinted in Publications of the Narragansett Club, vol. ii, along with John Cotton's letter which it answered). His most famous work is The Bloudy Tenent of Persecution for Cause of Conscience (published in 1644), considered by some to be one of the best defenses of liberty of conscience.

An anonymous pamphlet was published in London in 1644 entitled Queries of Highest Consideration Proposed to Mr. Tho. Goodwin, Mr. Phillip Nye, Mr. Wil. Bridges, Mr. Jer. Burroughs, Mr. Sidr. Simpson, all Independents, etc. which is now ascribed to Williams. These "Independents" were members of the Westminster Assembly; their Apologetical Narration sought a way between extreme Separatism and Presbyterianism, and their prescription was to accept the state church model of Massachusetts Bay.

Williams published The Bloody Tenent yet more Bloudy: by Mr. Cotton's Endeavor to wash it white in the Blood of the Lamb; of whose precious Blood, spilt in the Bloud of his Servants; and of the Blood of Millions spilt in former and later Wars for Conscience sake, that most Bloody Tenent of Persecution for cause of Conscience, upon, a second Tryal is found more apparently and more notoriously guilty, etc. (London, 1652) during his second visit to England. This work reiterated and amplified the arguments in Bloudy Tenent, but it has the advantage of being written in answer to Cotton's A Reply to Mr. Williams his Examination.

Other works by Williams include:

- The Hireling Ministry None of Christ's (London, 1652)
- Experiments of Spiritual Life and Health, and their Preservatives (London, 1652; reprinted Providence, 1863)
- George Fox Digged out of his Burrowes (Boston, 1676) (discusses Quakerism with its different belief in the "inner light", which Williams considered heretical)

A volume of his letters is included in the Narragansett Club edition of Williams's Works (7 vols., Providence, 1866–74), and a volume was edited by John Russell Bartlett (1882).

- The Correspondence of Roger Williams, 2 vols., Rhode Island Historical Society, 1988, edited by Glenn W. LaFantasie

Brown University's John Carter Brown Library has long housed a 234-page volume referred to as the "Roger Williams Mystery Book". The margins of this book are filled with notations in handwritten code, believed to be the work of Roger Williams. In 2012, Brown University undergraduate Lucas Mason-Brown cracked the code and uncovered conclusive historical evidence attributing its authorship to Williams. Translations are revealing transcriptions of a geographical text, a medical text, and 20 pages of original notes addressing the issue of infant baptism. Mason-Brown has since discovered more writings by Williams employing a separate code in the margins of a rare edition of the Eliot Indian Bible.

== Legacy ==
Tributes to Roger Williams

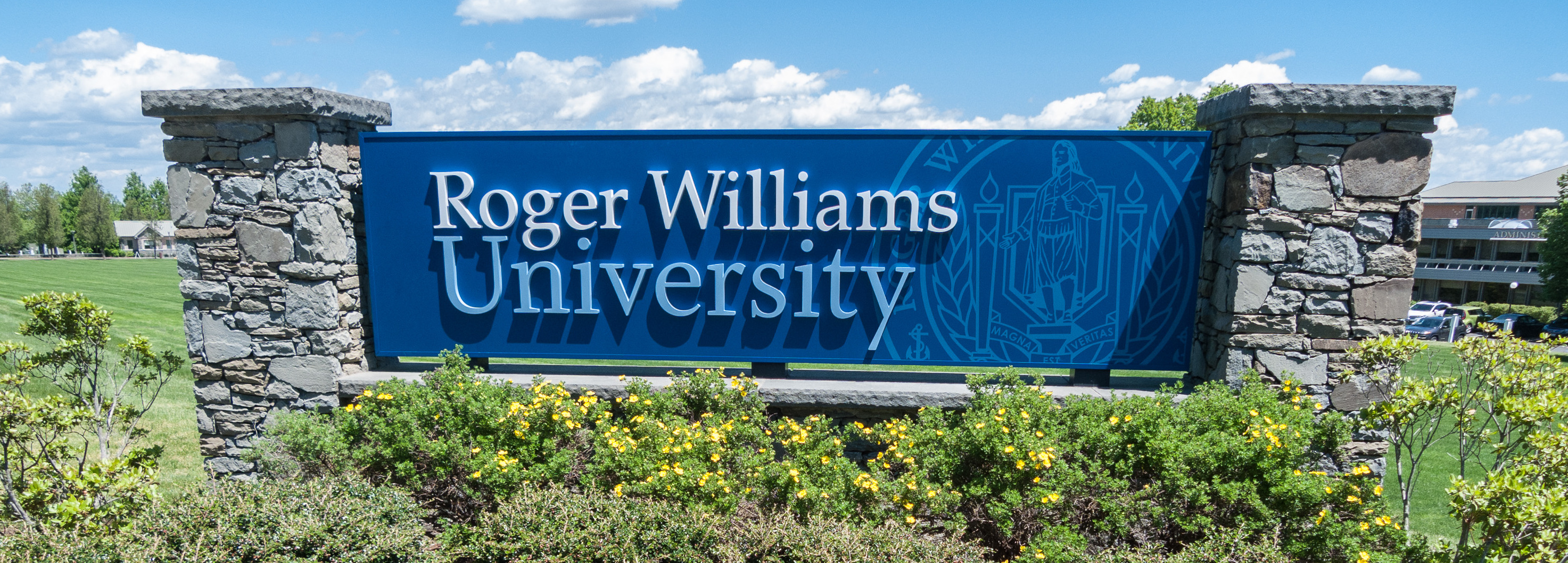
Roger Williams University in Bristol, Rhode Island

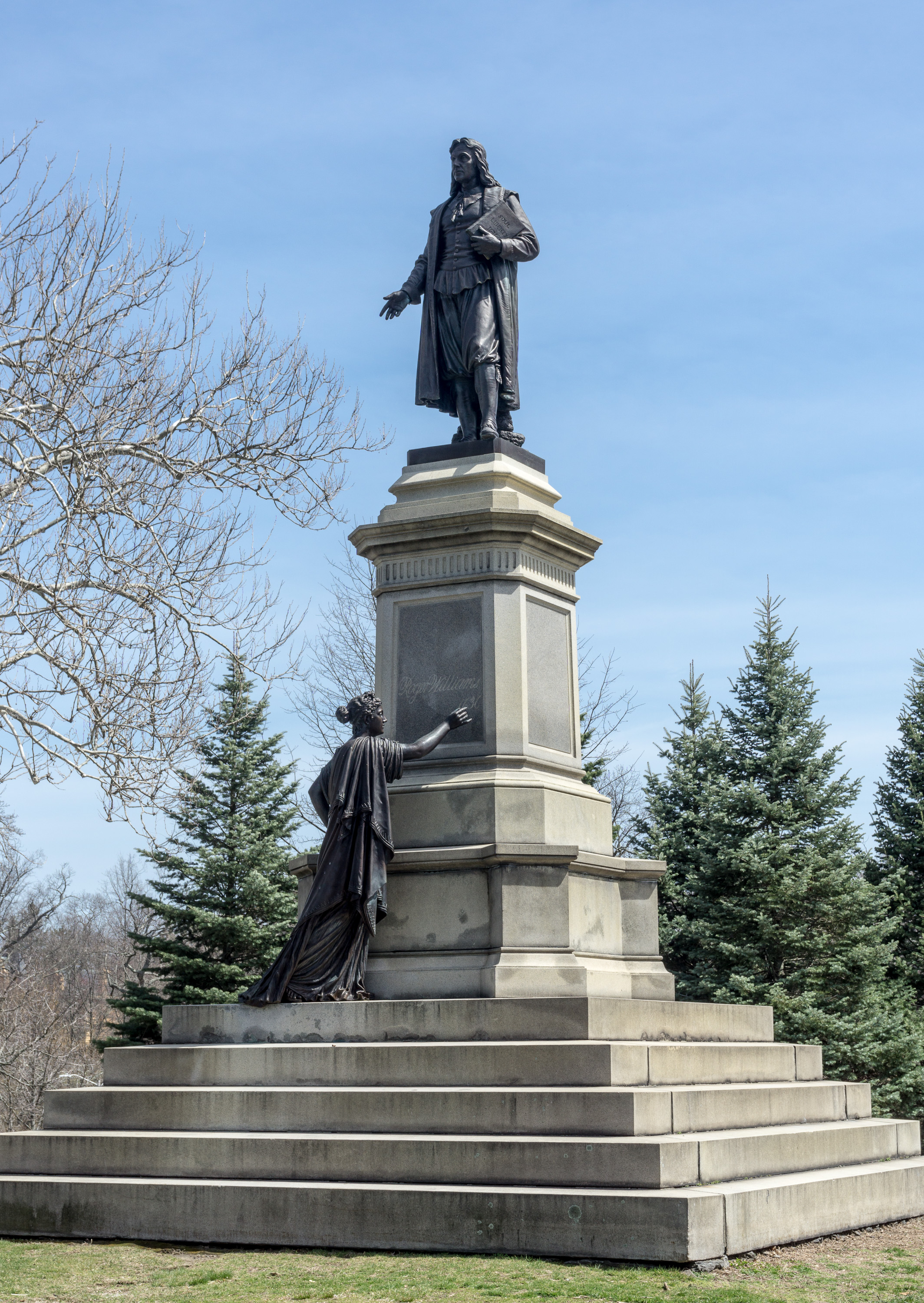
Memorial statue in Roger Williams Park

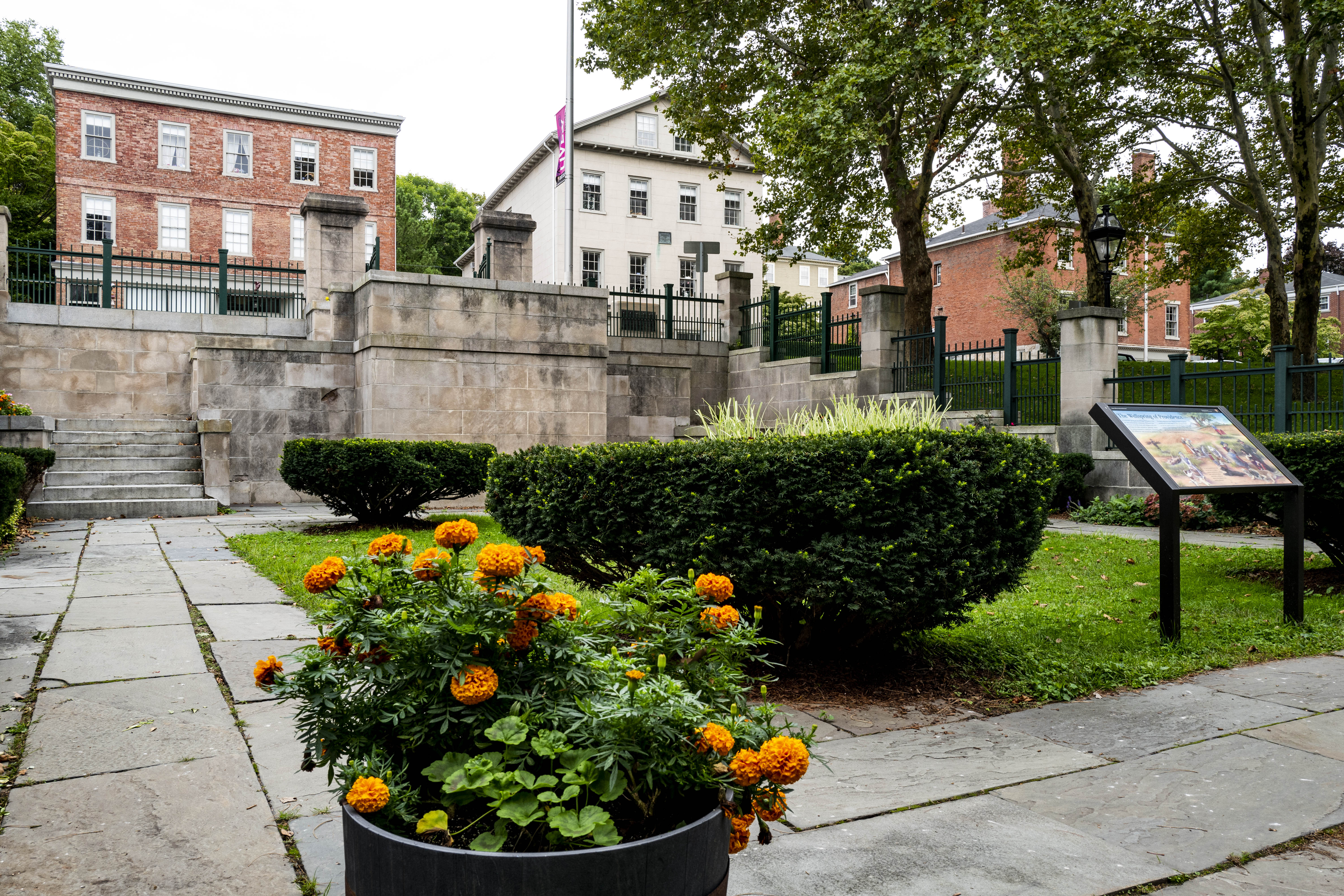
Roger Williams National Memorial in Providence

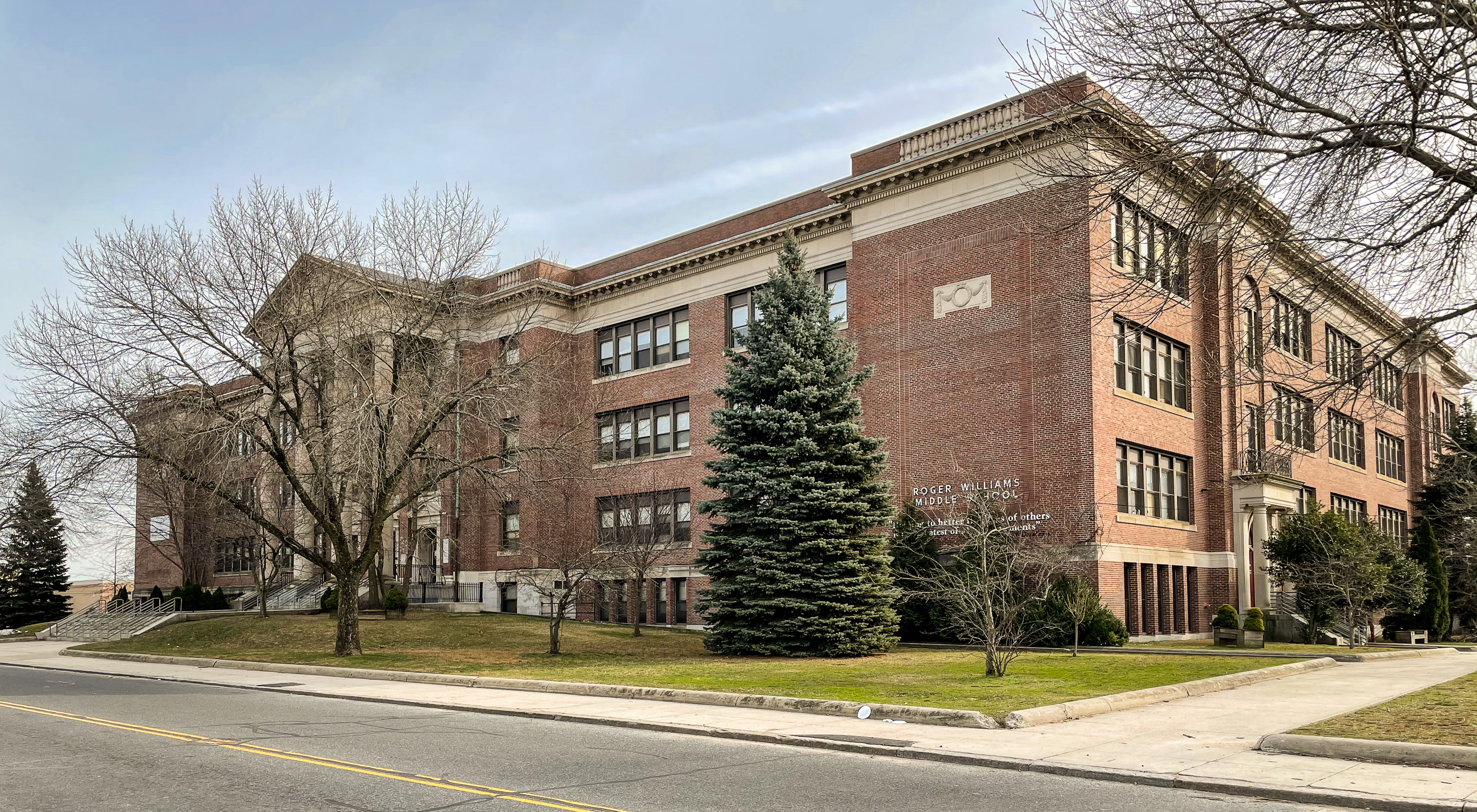
Roger Williams Middle School in Providence

Williams's defense of the Native Americans, his accusations that Puritans had reproduced the "evils" of the Anglican Church, and his insistence that England pay the Native Americans for their land all put him at the center of many political debates during his life. He was considered an important historical figure of religious liberty at the time of American independence, and he was a key influence on the thinking of the Founding Fathers.

=== Tributes ===
Tributes to Williams include:

- The 1936 commemorative Rhode Island Tercentenary half dollar
- Roger Williams National Memorial, a park in downtown Providence established in 1965
- Roger Williams Park, Providence, Rhode Island, and the Roger Williams Park Zoo
- Roger Williams University in Bristol, Rhode Island
- Roger Williams Dining Hall at the University of Rhode Island
- Roger Williams Inn, the main dining hall at the American Baptists' Green Lake Conference Center founded in 1943 in Green Lake, Wisconsin
- Roger Williams Medical Center, a hospital in Providence
- Rhode Island's representative statue in the National Statuary Hall Collection in the United States Capitol, added in 1872
- A depiction of him on the International Monument to the Reformation in Geneva, along with other prominent reformers
- Roger Williams Middle School, a public school in Providence
- Pembroke College in Brown University was named for Williams's alma mater

=== Slate Rock ===
Slate Rock

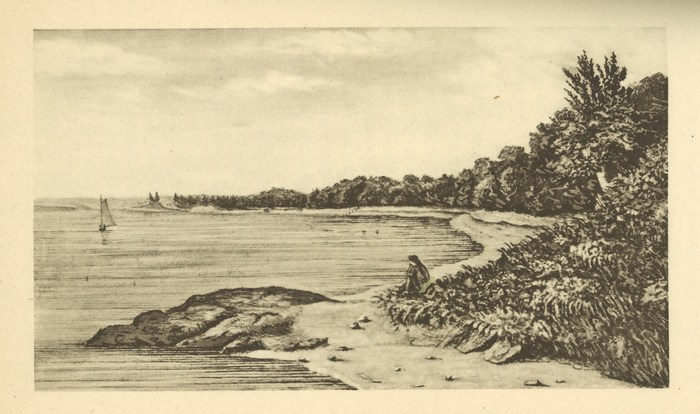
1832 painting of Slate Rock by Edward L. Peckham

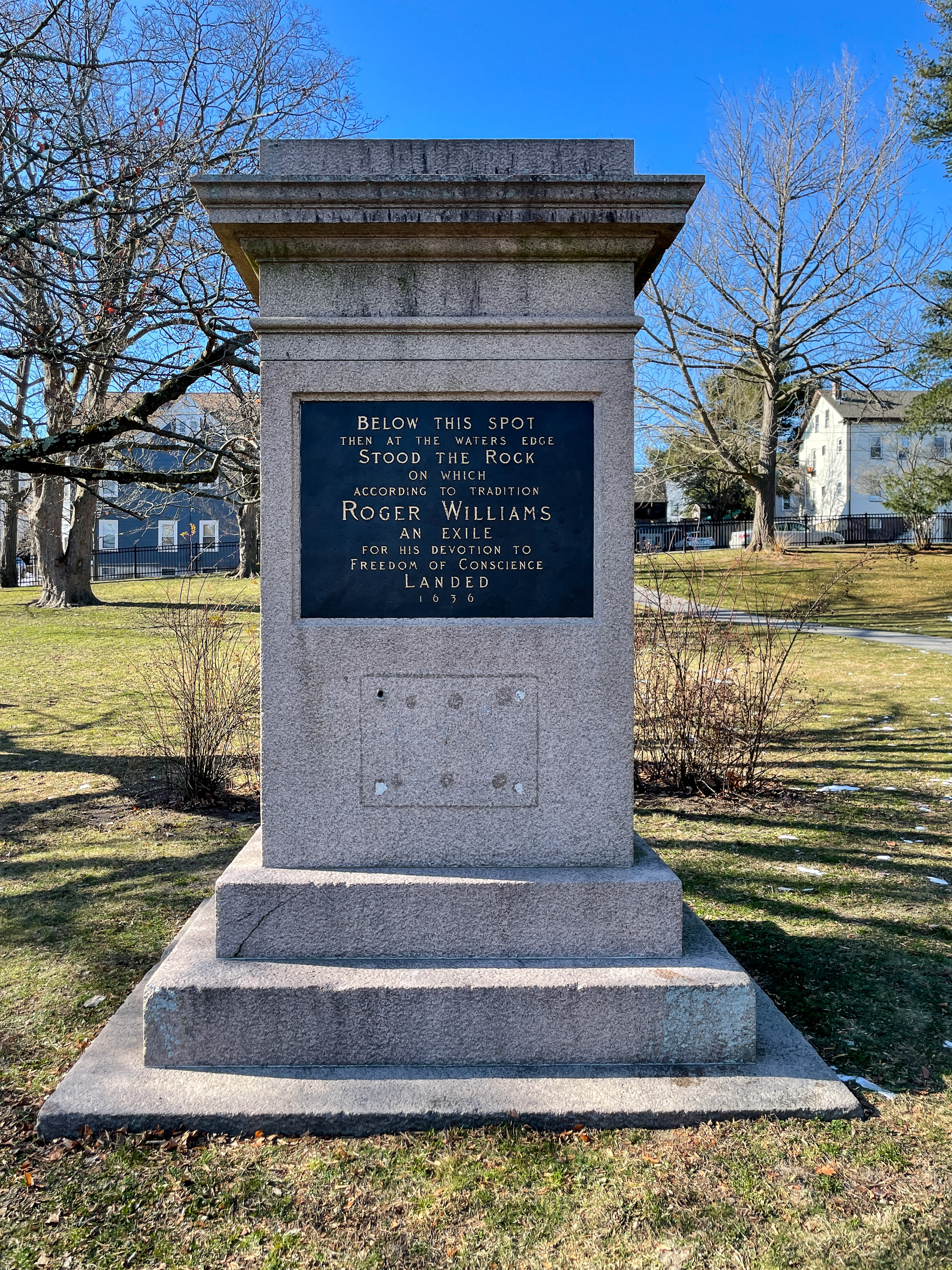
Memorial in Roger Williams Square

Slate Rock is a prominent boulder on the west shore of the Seekonk River (near the current Gano Park) that was once one of Providence's most important historic landmarks. It was believed to be the spot where the Narragansetts greeted Williams with the famous phrase "What cheer, netop?" The historic rock was accidentally blown up by city workers in 1877. They were attempting to expose a buried portion of the stone, but used too much dynamite and it was "blasted to pieces". A memorial in Roger Williams Square commemorates the location.

== See also ==
- Colony of Rhode Island and Providence Plantations
- List of early settlers of Rhode Island
- Joseph Kinnicutt Angell
- Roger Williams National Memorial
- Roger Williams Park
- Roger Williams (train)
