= Arnold family =

U.S. political and military family

Arnold
- Current region: New England and Cincinnati, Ohio, United States of America; Great Britain, Canada
- Etymology: Old Frankish: arnu & walda (English: eagle & powerful)
- Origin: England
- Members: Benedict Arnold I, Benedict Arnold V, Richard Arnold, Lemuel H. Arnold, Isaac N. Arnold, Henry H. "Hap" Arnold
- Connected families: Astor family Carpenter Family; Longworth family Westcott Family
- Motto: Ut vivas vigila (watch that you may live)

The Arnold family is an American political and military family with ties to New England, Georgia and Ohio. The descendants of American Revolutionary War general Benedict Arnold in Great Britain, while not particularly politically active, also achieved notable success in the 19th century.

== History ==
William Arnold was one of the founding settlers of the British Colony of Rhode Island and Providence Plantations, and one of the 13 original settlers of Providence. He was the son of Nicholas Arnold of Northover and Ilchester in County Somerset, England by his first wife Alice Gully. William was born in Ilchester on 24 Jun 1587, and all four of his children were also born there. In 1622 he was the warden of St. Mary's Church in Ilchester and remained in that town until immigrating to New England in 1635. One remarkable aspect of his emigration from England is that he had copied baptismal records from the parish registers of Northover and Ilchester and brought these with him to the New World, beginning a record that would eventually encompass six generations of his family. In New England William Arnold first settled in Hingham in the Massachusetts Bay Colony, but within a year joined Roger Williams in founding the settlement of Providence on the Narraganset Bay. By 1638 William had moved to the Pawtuxet River, five miles south of Providence, and lived there the remainder of his life, dying some time in 1675 or 1676 during the turmoil of King Philip's War. William's son Benedict Arnold was the first Governor of Rhode Island under the royal charter of 1663.

Other members of the Arnold family came to Boston from England in 1687. The. Rev. William George Arnold, a minister, was charged with the task of establishing a parish of the official religion of England, the Church of England in Boston. Upon arrival he found he was disliked in Boston and quickly learned that no one would sell land for the construction of a church that was not Puritan. He established King's Chapel in Boston in 1689 on public land. William was soon followed from England by his brother Edward Arnold, who opened a successful general store in Boston.

Edward Arnold brought two daughters with him from England. The older of the pair, Charlotte, married the Puritan minister Ebenezer Punderson in 1730. He was a Yale graduate and was ordained as a Puritan minister in 1729 and began serving as the minister of the Congregational Church in North Groton (now Ledyard), Connecticut. It seems that her Church of England upbringing and beliefs made an impression on her husband, as he announced his intention to be ordained in the Church of England and left his Congregational Church and was ordained in London in 1734. He erected a parish of the Church of England in Preston, Connecticut in 1735, and at a service attended by William and Edward Arnold, the place was consecrated St. James' Church.

Upon the 1737 death of William Arnold, many of his children moved to Connecticut near Preston and St. James' Church where the climate for Church of England members was less harsh. The family prospered in Connecticut and married well. One of Gov. Benedict Arnold's descendants Benedict IIU married his cousin Mary Arnold (who was descended from the William George side of the family) and gained control of the family estate in Norwich. They also named their son Benedict Arnold. This Benedict would go on to marry Hannah Lathrop, who would name their first son Benedict IV, who died in infancy. Their second son, Benedict Arnold V, became a general and war hero but is now best known as an infamous turn-coat for his treasonous attempt to surrender West Point and subsequent flight to the British side during the war.

During the American Revolution the family became active in politics. The William George Arnold side of the family remained fiercely loyal to English rule while the Benedict side favored independence. Jonathan Arnold (1741–1793) became a member of the Rhode Island Legislature in 1776 and then a delegate to the Continental Congress from Rhode Island from 1782 to 1784.

After the revolution, much of the family left New England for Savannah, Georgia, where they opened a number of mills. The Savannah branch of the family remained active in politics until the American Civil War.
