= Verin =

Verin may refer to:

- Vérin, a city in France
- Verín, a city in Spain
- Verín (comarca), a comarca in Spain
- Verrine (demon), a demon in Christian mythology
- Verin (Dungeons & Dragons), a demon lord in the Dungeons & Dragons roleplaying game
- Verin Mathwin Sedai, a fictional character in Robert Jordan's The Wheel of Time fantasy series
- Joshua Verin, an early 17th-century Providence settler disenfranchised for restricting his wife's liberty of conscience
- Jane Verin, an early 17th-century Providence settler whose case established liberty of conscience for women in the home
