= Arnold Burying Ground =

Cemetery in Newport, Rhode Island

Coordinates: 41°29′10″N 71°18′43″W

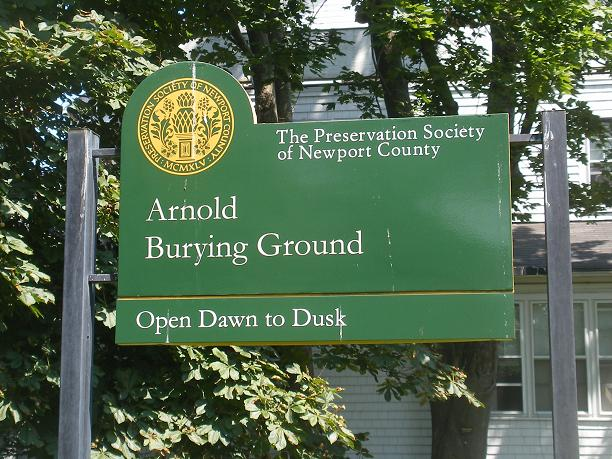
- Interactive map of Arnold Burying Ground

Details
- Established: 1677
- Location: Newport, Rhode Island
- Country: United States
- Type: Family
- Owned by: Preservation Society of Newport County
- No. of interments: 62

Arnold Burying Ground (also known as the Governor Arnold Burying Ground) is a historic cemetery on Pelham Street just east of Spring Street in Newport, Rhode Island, United States. It is the burial place of Benedict Arnold, Rhode Island's first governor under the Royal Charter of 1663.

== History and description ==
The cemetery was established in 1677 as the burying ground for the family of Governor Arnold, who immigrated to Rhode Island from England in 1635 with his father William Arnold. The Governor, his wife, and many of his family are buried here. For many years, the cemetery was buried under a garden in the back yard of a residence, but a major renovation began in 1949 in which all the stones were unearthed, cleaned, and returned to their original positions. There is no inscription on the slabs covering the graves of the governor and his wife, but his grave is marked with a medallion. The cemetery is currently owned and maintained by the Preservation Society of Newport County.

== Images ==
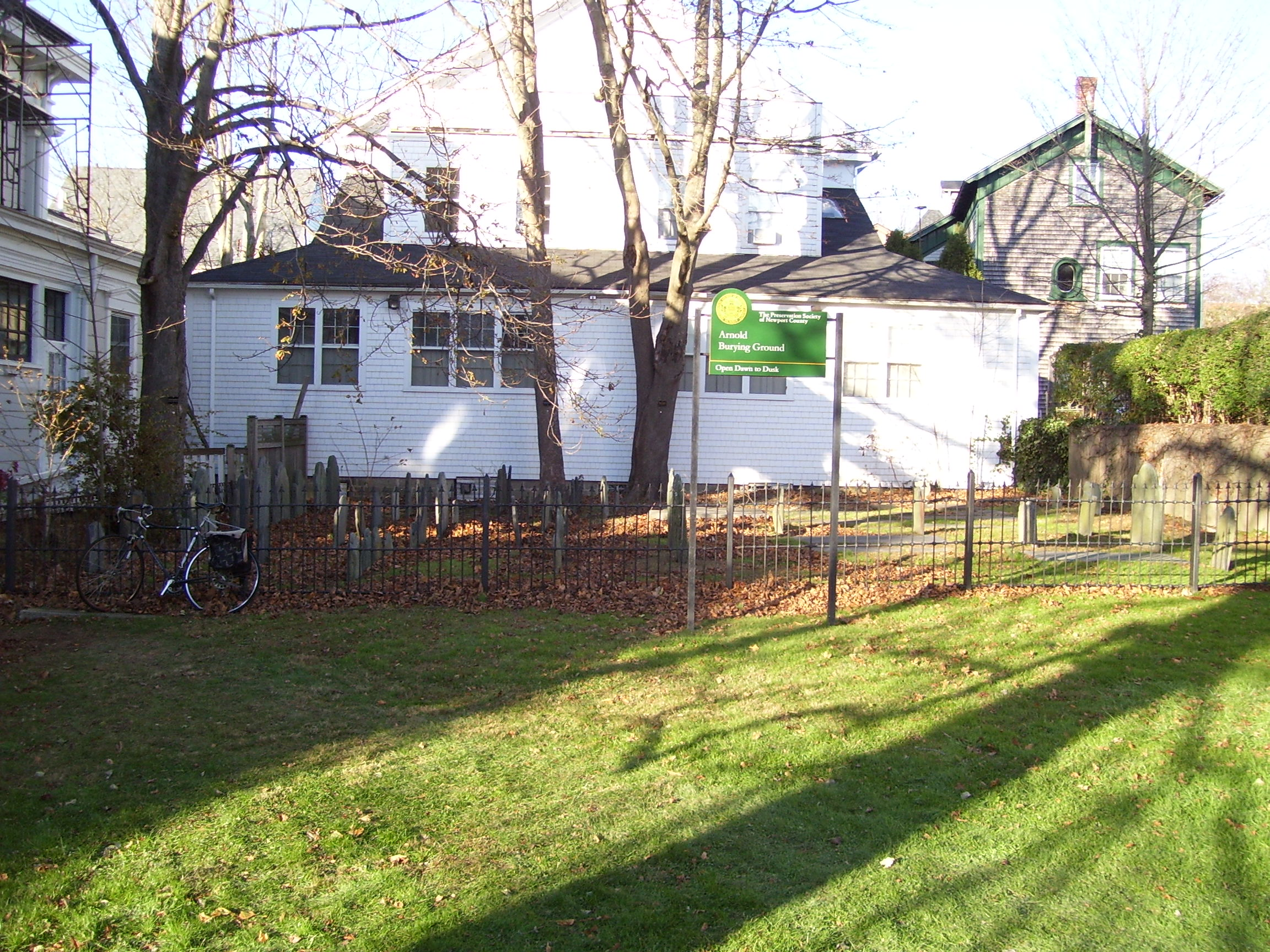
Arnold Burying Ground

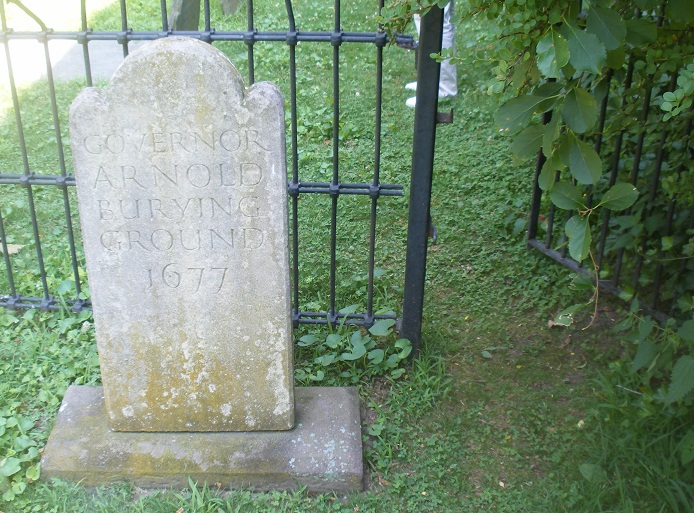
Entry marker near gate

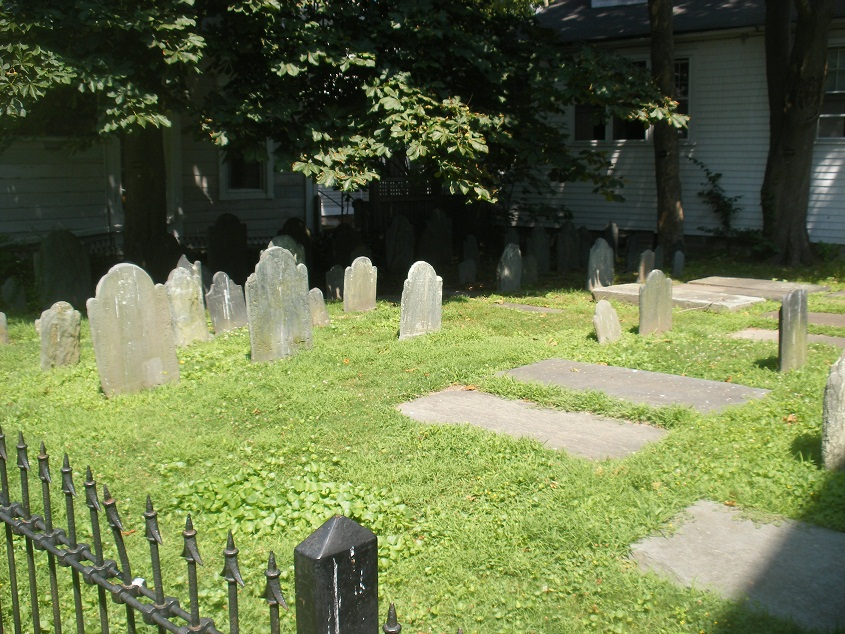
View looking northwest from gate

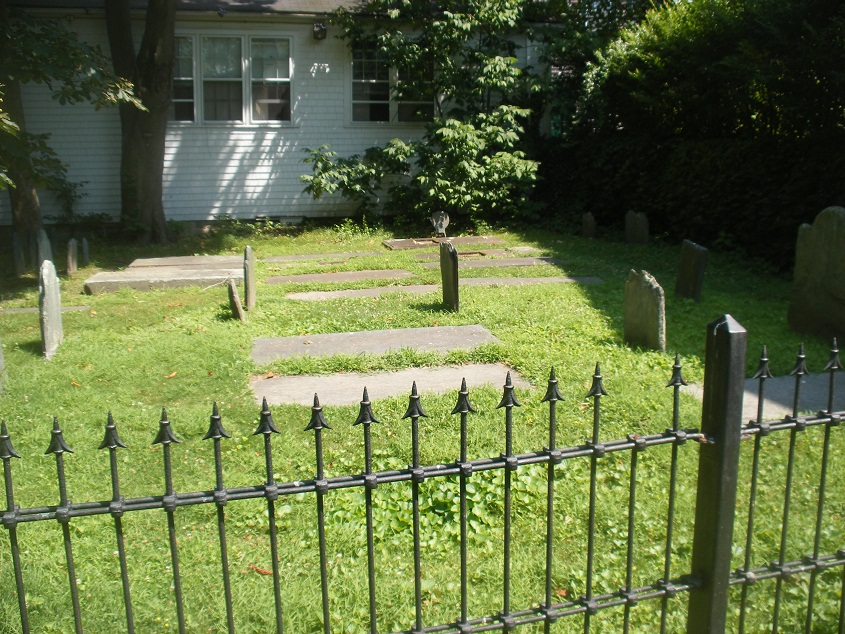
View looking north with governor's medallion visible in back

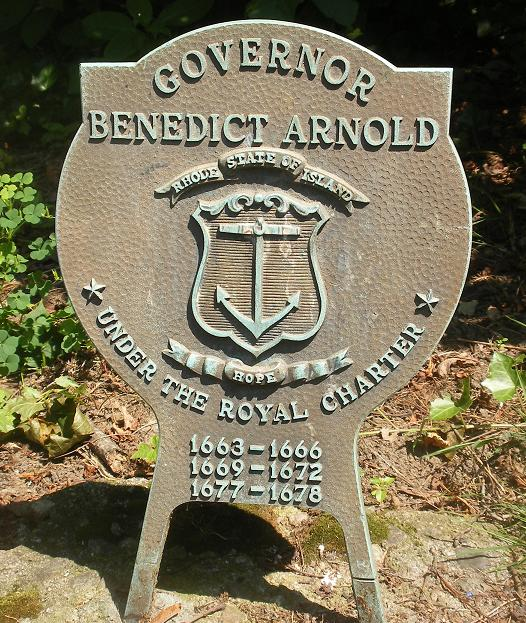
Governor Benedict Arnold grave medallion

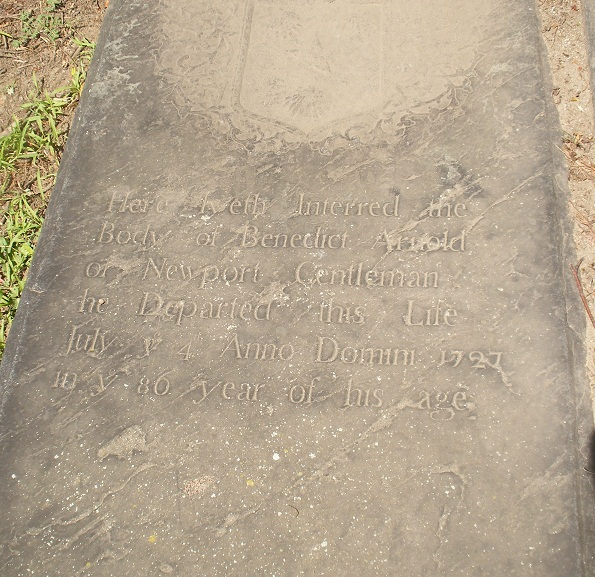
Inscribed slab of Benedict Arnold, Jr.

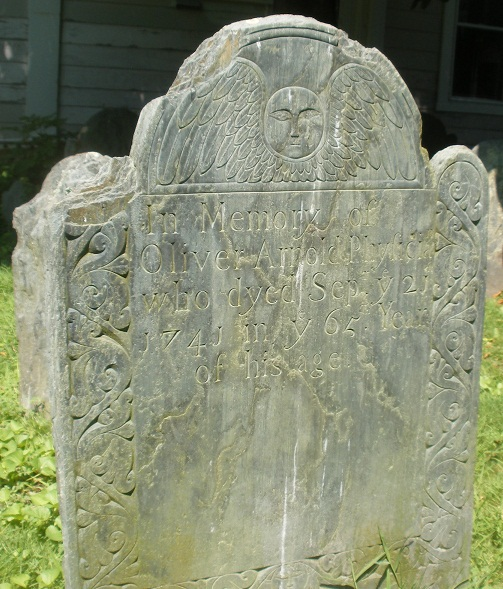
Gravestone of Dr. Oliver Arnold
