= Joshua Verin =

First settler of Providence, Rhode Island

- Born: c. 1611; Wiltshire, England
- Died: 1695; St. James' Parish, Barbados, West Indies
- Occupation: Rope maker
- Known for: Disfranchisement for violating his wife's freedom of conscience
- Spouses: Jane Reeves (m. bef. 1635-?); Agnes Simpson (m. 1694-1695)
- Parents: Philip Verin; Dorcas Margaret Hilliard

Joshua Verin (c. 1611 – 1695) was a founding settler of Providence in what would become the Colony of Rhode Island and Providence Plantations. He is best known for being disfranchised for violating his wife's freedom of conscience by severely beating her when she refused to stop attending prayer meetings held by Roger Williams.

== Life ==
Joshua Verin and his wife, Jane Verin (née Reeves), resided in New Sarum, Wiltshire, England, where he was a rope maker by trade. The Verins—including Joshua's mother-in-law, parents, and siblings—immigrated to New England aboard the James. They arrived in Boston in 1635 and settled in Salem where they became members of the First Church of Salem.

Jane and Joshua disagreed about religion: Joshua was a non-separating Puritan while Jane and her mother, Margery Reeves, were separatists. Both women risked excommunication and corporal punishment for their beliefs and their refusal to attend the Salem church. The three soon moved to Providence, which was established by Roger Williams as a refuge for fellow separatists and other persecuted groups.

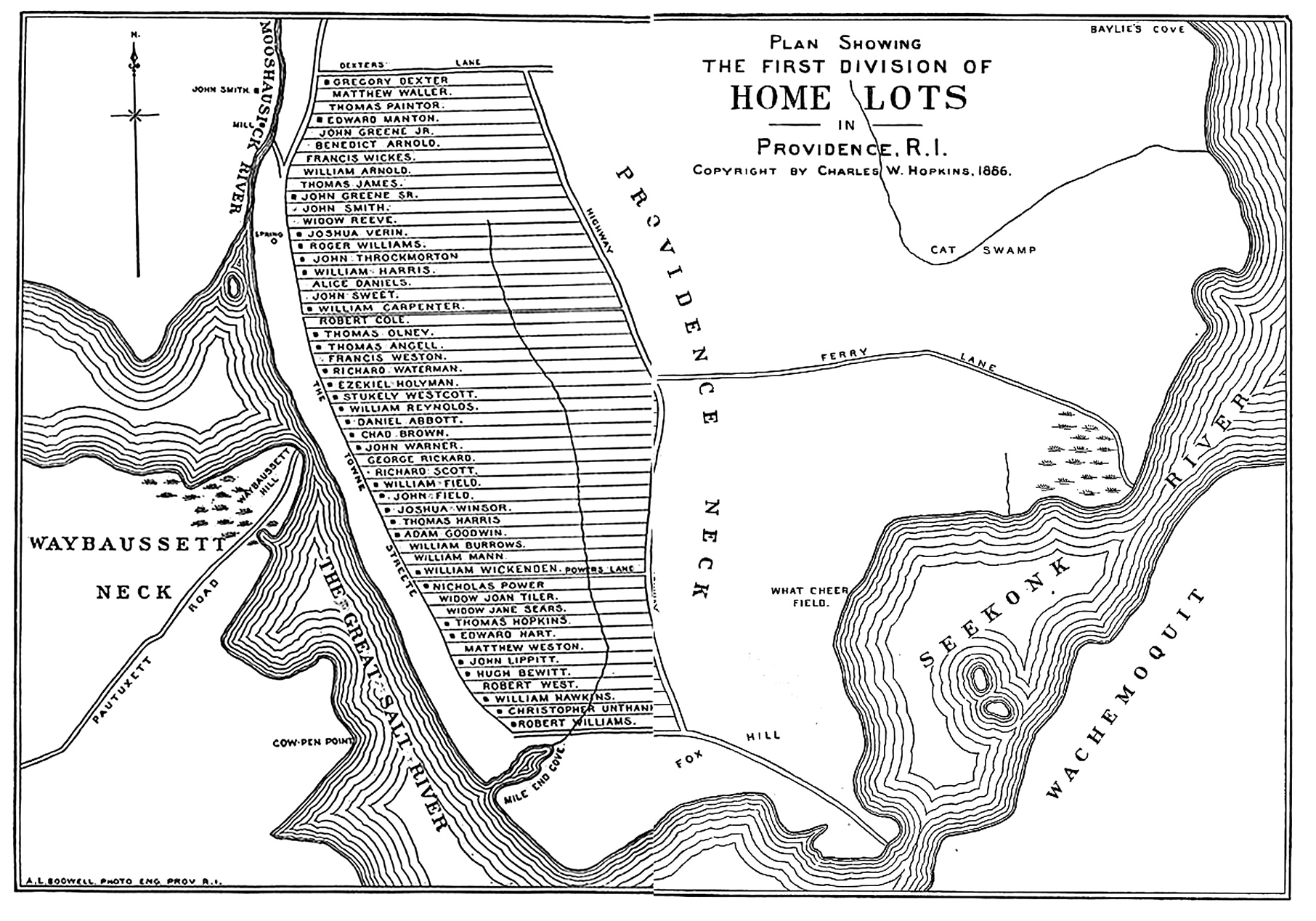
Town lot layout of Providence showing the lots of Joshua Verin and Widow Reeves

Joshua Verin, according to his own account, was one of the six people present at Providence's first settlement in 1636. Joshua was granted a Providence home lot adjacent to Williams's lot. In 1638, Jane's mother, Margery Reeves, also received a home lot.

Against Joshua's wishes, Jane attended prayer meetings held by Roger Williams. As a result, Joshua severely beat Jane for her disobedience. In 1638, Joshua was tried, convicted, and disfranchised for "restraining her liberty of conscience."

After returning to Salem, Joshua received 100 acres in 1638 and another 40 acres in 1640. Jane was expelled from the Salem church in 1640 after which she does not appear in town records. Joshua moved to Barbados by 1663 where he acquired land and eleven slaves. He married Agnes Simpson in 1694 and died in Barbados in 1695.

== Providence v Joshua Verin ==
=== The trial ===
At a town meeting on May 21, 1638, Verin was tried and convicted not of assault but of “restraining her liberty of conscience,” after which he was disfranchised by a majority vote. The Providence town record for that day states: “Joshua Verin upon ye breach of a covenant for restraining of ye liberty of conscience shall be withheld from the liberty of voting till he shall declare ye contrary.”

In a letter to John Winthrop dated May 22, 1638, Roger Williams reported that Verin had “troden her under foote tyrannically and brutishly,” and that “with his furious blowes she went in danger of Life,” adding that Verin intended to “hale his wife with ropes to Salem.” Modern scholarship identifies the case as the first known legal recognition in America of a woman’s liberty of conscience.

=== Winthrop’s account ===
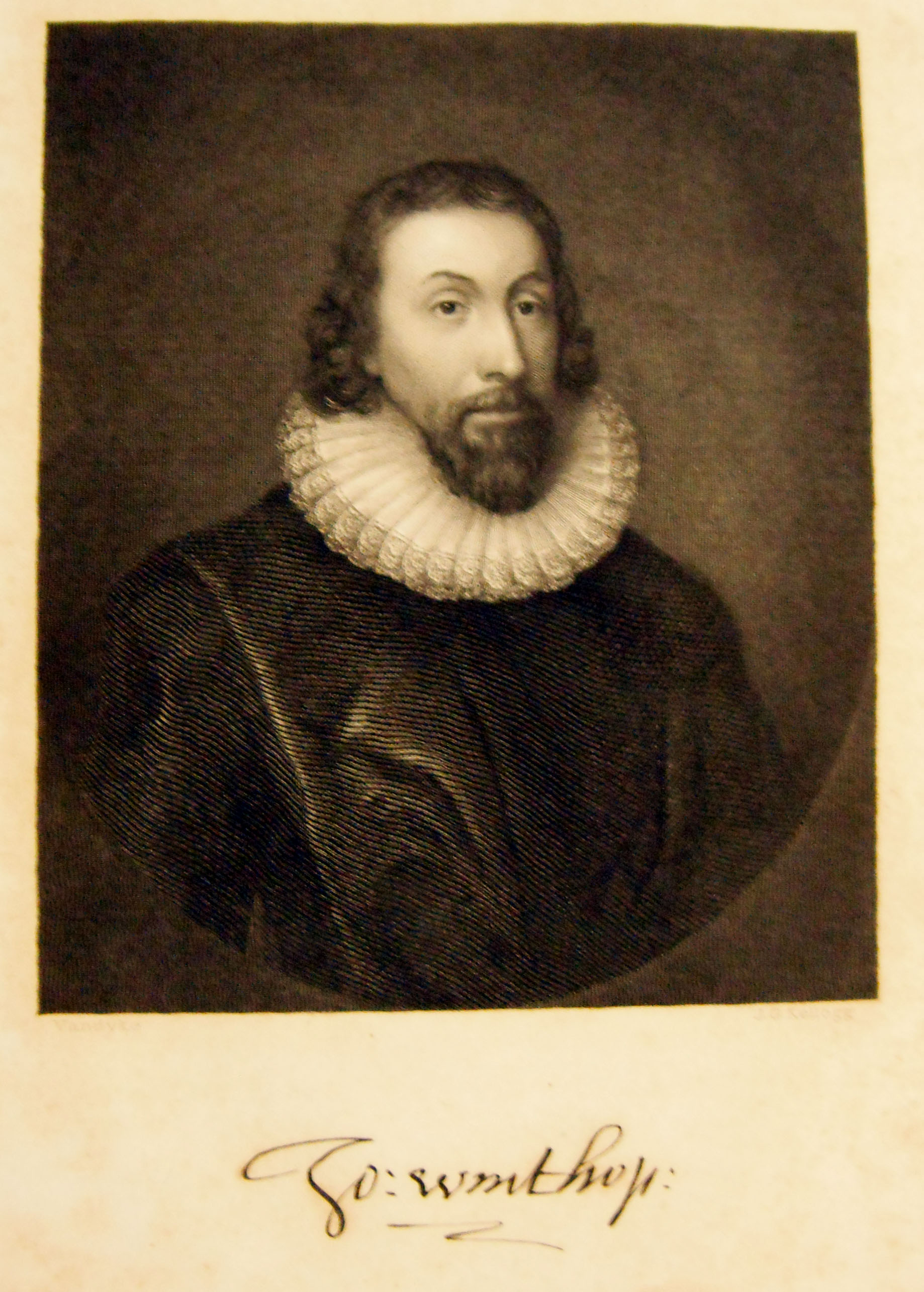
John Winthrop

Governor John Winthrop gave a second-hand account of the Verin case in his journal as an example of the tensions created when liberty of conscience was applied within the household. He noted that the original Providence order—that “no man should be molested for his conscience”—was being claimed not only by men, but also by “men’s wives, and children, and servants,” who sought liberty to attend religious meetings “though never so often, or though private, upon the week days.”

In Winthrop’s account, Providence resident William Arnold argued at the trial that when he consented to the order against molesting any man for his conscience, he “never intended it should extend to the breach of any ordinance of God, such as the subjection of wives to their husbands,” and warned that applying liberty of conscience to wives would overturn divinely ordained household authority. Surgeon John Greene replied that if husbands restrained their wives from exercising liberty of conscience, “all the women in the country would cry out of them,” highlighting the potential for widespread female resistance.

=== Significance ===
Winthrop’s narrative shows that the Verin case was not only about one marriage, but about the broader implications of liberty of conscience for wives, children, and servants within Puritan households. By upholding Jane Verin’s religious freedom against her husband’s authority, Providence implicitly extended liberty of conscience beyond male heads of household, challenging traditional hierarchies and foreshadowing later debates over the rights of dependents.

According to historian Margaret Manchester, “This incident appears to be the first time that a wife’s liberty of conscience, independent of her husband’s, was upheld in the English colonies.” Legal scholar Edward Eberle writes that recognizing a woman’s independent religious liberty “was an unprecedented act for the time, and a forward-looking vision of things to come.”

== Bibliography ==
- Armitage, Thomas (1886). A History of the Baptists: Traced by Their Vital Principles and Practices, from the Time of Our Lord and Saviour Jesus Christ to the Present. Bryan, Taylor & Company. p. 650.
- Austin, John Osborne (1969). The Genealogical Dictionary of Rhode Island: Comprising Three Generations of Settlers who Came Before 1690, with Many Families Carried to the Fourth Generation. Genealogical Publishing Com. ISBN 978-0-8063-0006-1.
- Bicknell, Thomas Williams (1920). The History of the State of Rhode Island and Providence Plantations. American Historical Society.
- Christian, John T. (2014-03-05). A History of the Baptists Volumes I and II. Solid Christian Books.
- Eberle, Edward (2004-04-01). "Another of Roger William's Gifts: Women's Right to Liberty of Conscience: Joshua Verin v. Providence Plantations". Roger Williams University Law Review.
- Elliott, Charles Wyllys (1857). The New England History, from the Discovery of the Continent by the Northmen, A. D. 986, to the Period when the Colonies Declared Their Independence, A. D. 1776. C. Scribner.
- Field, Edward (1902). State of Rhode Island and Providence Plantations at the End of the Century: A History. Mason Publishing Company.
- First Church (Salem, Mass.) (1974). The records of the First Church in Salem, Massachusetts, 1629-1736. Essex Institute. ISBN 978-0-88389-050-9.
- Hall, Timothy; Hall, Timothy L. (1998). Separating Church and State: Roger Williams and Religious Liberty. University of Illinois Press. ISBN 978-0-252-06664-1.
- Hopkins, Charles Wyman (1886). The home lots of the early settlers of the Providence Plantations: with notes and plats. Providence Press Co.
- Knowles, James Davis (1834). Memoir of Roger Williams: The Founder of the State of Rhode-Island. Lincoln, Edmands. ISBN 978-0-524-04821-4.
- Manchester, Margaret (2017). "A Family "Much Afflicted with Conscience"". Journal of Family History. 42 (3): 211–235. doi:10.1177/0363199017710952. ISSN 0363-1990. S2CID 148985196.
- Manchester, Margaret Murányi (2019-05-31). Puritan Family and Community in the English Atlantic World: Being "Much Afflicted with Conscience". Routledge. ISBN 978-0-429-61990-8.
- Massachusetts Historical Society (1848). Collections of the Massachusetts Historical Society. Massachusetts Historical Society.
- The New England Historical and Genealogical Register. New England Historic Genealogical Society. 1977.
- Williams, Roger (1874). Bartlett, John Russell (ed.). Letters of Roger Williams (PDF). Providence: Providence Press Co. pp. 94–96.
