= Jane Verin =

Early colonial American woman whose case established women's religious liberty

- Born: Jane Reeves c. 1610s New Sarum (Salisbury), Wiltshire, England
- Died: after 1640
- Known for: First legal precedent in English colonies upholding a wife's independent liberty of conscience within the household
- Spouse: Joshua Verin (m. bef. 1635)
- Parents: Mother: Margery Reeves; Father: Unknown

Jane Verin (née Reeves; c. 1610s – after 1640) was an early settler of Providence in New England (present-day Providence, Rhode Island). In a 1638 Providence town meeting the assembly disenfranchised her husband, Joshua Verin, for preventing her from attending religious meetings, marking the first recorded instance in the colonies in which a woman's freedom of conscience was legally recognized as independent of her spouse's authority. The decision influenced the language of the 1640 Providence Combination, which explicitly affirmed "liberty of conscience."

== Biography ==
=== Early life and immigration (c. 1610s–1635) ===
Jane Reeves was born in England around the 1610s, likely in New Sarum (Salisbury), Wiltshire. She was the daughter of Margery Reeves, though her father's identity remains unknown. Before 1635, she married Joshua Verin, a rope maker and non-separating Puritan.

In 1635, Jane and Joshua immigrated to New England aboard the ship James with Jane's mother Margery and the extended Verin family. They initially settled in Salem, Massachusetts, where they became members of the First Church in Salem. However, Jane and Margery's Separatist beliefs immediately put them in conflict with the official church. Both women "refused to worship with the congregation" and "denied that the churches of the Bay colony were true churches" because they had not completely separated from the Church of England. This created a religious divide in Jane and Joshua's marriage.

=== Religious conflict and move to Providence (1635–1637) ===
For nearly three years in Salem, Jane and Margery maintained their religious convictions despite mounting pressure from authorities. Their refusal to attend mandatory church services risked excommunication and corporal punishment, but both women persisted in their defiance. The conflict between Jane and Joshua escalated during this period as Jane actively challenged church attendance requirements while Joshua remained a member in good standing.

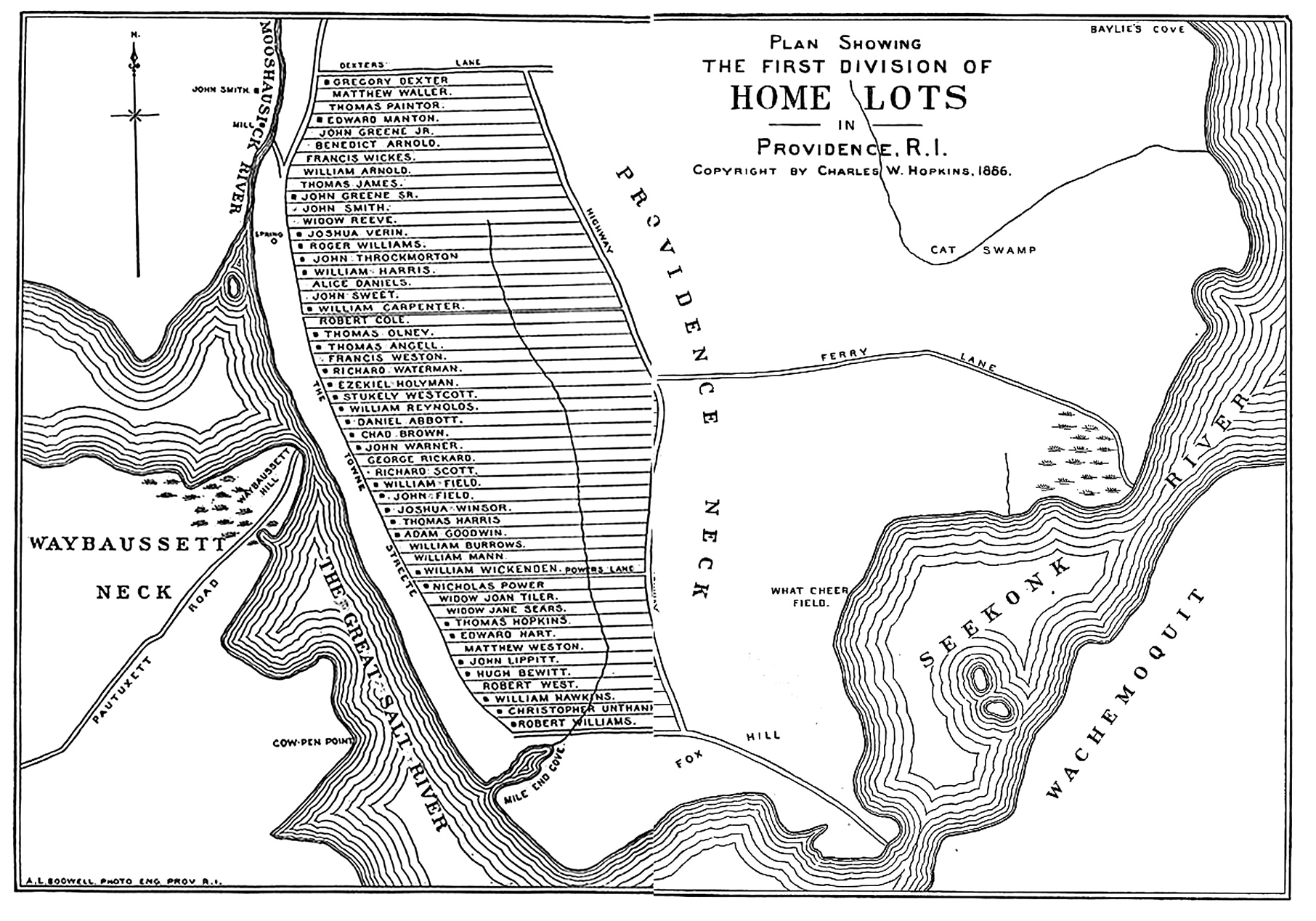
Town lot layout of Providence showing the lots of the Verins and Widow Reeves

Around 1636–1637, the family relocated to Providence, Rhode Island, established by Roger Williams as a refuge for religious dissenters. Jane and Joshua received a house lot next to Roger Williams's lot and Margery received a nearby lot. Unlike Massachusetts Bay Colony, Providence did not mandate church attendance or religious orthodoxy, allowing Jane to freely attend any religious meetings of her choice.

Ironically, once in Providence, it was Joshua who "refused to heare the word with us (wch we molested him not for) this twelve month," as Williams noted in his correspondence.

=== Domestic violence and the trial (1637–1638) ===
In Providence, while Jane exercised her religious freedom by attending Williams' prayer meetings, Joshua strongly opposed her participation and forbade her from attending. When Jane continued to attend despite his prohibition, Joshua began severely beating her. According to Roger Williams, Joshua "hath trodden her under foote tyrannically & brutishly" and "with his furious blows she went in danger of life."

The Providence community convened a town meeting on May 21, 1638, to address what Williams called an "unruly person" whose actions threatened "no other than the Raping of the Fundamentall Liberties of the Countrey," which should be "dearer to us than our Right Eyes." The case proved highly contentious and divided the community along ideological lines:

- William Arnold argued that Joshua had a biblical right to discipline his wife and was exercising his own liberty of conscience, contending that when residents consented to liberty of conscience, they never "intended that it should extend to the breach of any ordinance of God, such as the subjection of wives to their husbands."
- John Greene countered that allowing husbands to beat their wives over matters of conscience would set a dangerous precedent, arguing that "if they should restrain their wives, etc., all the women in the country would cry out of them."

Some Providence residents even suggested that "if Verin would not suffer his wife to have her liberty, the church should dispose her to some other man, who would use her better."

Joshua Verin was found guilty and disfranchised specifically for "breach of a covenant for restraining of ye liberty of conscience"—notably, not for the physical abuse itself, but for violating his wife's religious freedom. As Howard Chapin observed, "Verin persecuted his wife for her religious practices. The town did not persecute Verin for his religious practices, but punished him for his religious intolerance of others, particularly of his wife."

=== Final years and disappearance (1638–1640) ===
Following his disfranchisement, Joshua "forcibly moved Jane back to Salem" against her will, or as Williams described it, he "hale[ed] his wife with ropes to Salem, where she must needs be troubled and troublesome as differences yet stand." Margery Reeves also returned to Salem to be with her family. Back in Salem, Jane continued to face systematic persecution for her religious convictions:

- October 4, 1638: Referred to Salem authorities for refusing church attendance
- December 25, 1638: Tried in Salem court for absence from worship
- January 7, 1640: Expelled from the Salem church for continued religious non-conformity

After January 7, 1640, Jane Verin disappears entirely from historical records. Williams had noted that Jane was willing "to stay and live with him or else where, where she may not offend," indicating her continued willingness to submit to her husband's authority except in matters of religious conscience.

Joshua eventually moved to Barbados by September 1663, where he appears on the register of St. James parish by December 1679, owning "ten acres and eleven slaves." He married Agnes Simpson on October 7, 1694, at St. Michael's in Barbados and died on March 15, 1695.

== Legacy ==
Jane Verin's case established "positive liberty"—not just freedom from government interference (negative liberty provided by the 1637 Civil Compact), but active protection from private coercion in the domestic sphere. Jane's case directly influenced the Providence Combination of 1640, drafted just two years after her trial. This document became the first governmental instrument in Western history to explicitly mention "liberty of conscience," stating: "Wee agree, as formerly hath bin the liberties of the town, so still, to hould forth liberty of Conscience." This protection was more stringent than the modern First Amendment to the U.S. Constitution, which only protects against government interference, not private coercion.

Her case challenged the legal doctrine of coverture that subsumed wives' rights under husbands, creating precedent that spiritual obligations could override marital subordination. The decision affirmed the principle that religious conscience was conceived as "gender neutral" in Williams's vision of religious liberty.

The case also contributed to the broader development of Rhode Island's commitment to religious tolerance, culminating in the Charter of 1663. The town of Providence's willingness to support Jane's liberty of conscience in 1638 influenced the Charter's use of gender-neutral language in codifying that liberty for all Rhode Islanders, providing that "noe person within the sayd colonye [...] shall be any wise molested, punished, disquieted, or called in question for any differences in opinione in matters of religion."

== Bibliography ==
- Austin, John Osborne (1969). The Genealogical Dictionary of Rhode Island. Genealogical Publishing Com.
- Bicknell, Thomas Williams (1920). The History of the State of Rhode Island and Providence Plantations. New York: The American Historical Society.
- Eberle, Edward J. (2004). "Another of Roger Williams's Gifts: Women's Right to Liberty of Conscience: Joshua Verin v. Providence Plantations". Roger Williams University Law Review. 9 (2): 399–407.
- Elliott, Charles Wyllys (1857). The New England History. C. Scribner.
- Hopkins, Charles Wyman (1886). The Home Lots of the Early Settlers of the Providence Plantations. Providence Press Co.
- Manchester, Margaret M. (2017). "A Family "Much Afflicted with Conscience"". Journal of Family History. 42 (3): 211–235. doi:10.1177/0363199017710952.
- Manchester, Margaret M. (2009). A Wife's Liberty of Conscience. Providence College Research Forum. pp. 163–177.
- Manchester, Margaret M. (2019). Puritan Family and Community in the English Atlantic World. Routledge. doi:10.4324/9780429054860. ISBN 978-0-429-61990-8.
- Rogers, Horatio; Carpenter, George Moulton; Field, Edward (1892). The Early Records of the Town of Providence. Vol. 1. Providence: Snow & Farnham City Printers.
- The Records of the First Church in Salem, Massachusetts, 1629–1736. Essex Institute. 1974.
- Williams, Roger (1988). Glen W. LaFantasie (ed.). The Correspondence of Roger Williams. Vol. 1.
