= Stukely Westcott =

British colonist in North America (1592–1677)

- Born: 1592; Ilminster, Somerset, England
- Died: 12 January 1677; Portsmouth, Rhode Island
- Occupation(s): Commissioner, surveyor of highways, innkeeper
- Spouse: Juliann Marchante
- Children: Damaris, Samuel, Robert, Amos, Mercy, Jeremiah

Stukely Westcott (1592 – 12 January 1677) was one of the founding settlers of the Colony of Rhode Island and Providence Plantations and one of the original members of the first Baptist Church in America, established by Roger Williams in 1638. He came to New England from the town of Yeovil in Somerset, England and first settled in Salem in the Massachusetts Bay Colony, but difficulties with the authorities prompted him to join Roger Williams in settling near the Narragansett Bay in 1638 at Providence Plantations. He remained there for a few years, but he was recorded as an inhabitant of Warwick in 1648, probably having settled there several years earlier. He was most active in colonial affairs from 1650 to 1660 when he was a commissioner, surveyor of highways, and the keeper of a house of entertainment. His highest offices were as an Assistant in 1653 and much later as a deputy to the General Court in 1671 when he was almost 80 years old. He made his will on January 12, 1677, but died the same day with it unsigned, leaving his affairs in limbo for the following two decades.

== Early life ==
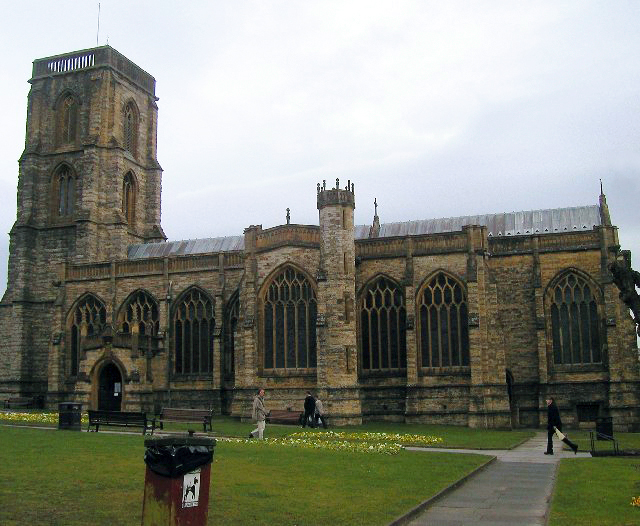
St John's Church in Yeovil, Somerset, England where Stukely Westcott and Juliann Marchante were married in 1619

The place of origin of the Westcott family appears to center around the town of Affton in county Devon, England. Here the unusual combination appears of the surnames Stukely and Westcott, as does the very unusual female given name of Damaris, found in the Stukely family.

Stukely Westcott first appears on a public record when he was married to Juliann Marchante in St. John's Church in Yeovil, Somerset on October 5, 1619; his marriage record indicated that he was from Ilminster, a town in Somerset about 12 miles west of Yeovil. The baptisms of two of Stukely Westcott's children were also recorded in Yeovil, daughter Damaris in 1620/21 and son Samuel in 1622/23. There is no record of where Westcott lived following the baptisms of these two children, but there is evidence that he and his family accompanied the family of William Arnold to New England, departing from the port town of Dartmouth in county Devon in 1635, based on a memorandum made in April 1656 by Benedict Arnold, the oldest son of William Arnold. Westcott's daughter Damaris married Benedict Arnold several years later.

== Settling in New England ==
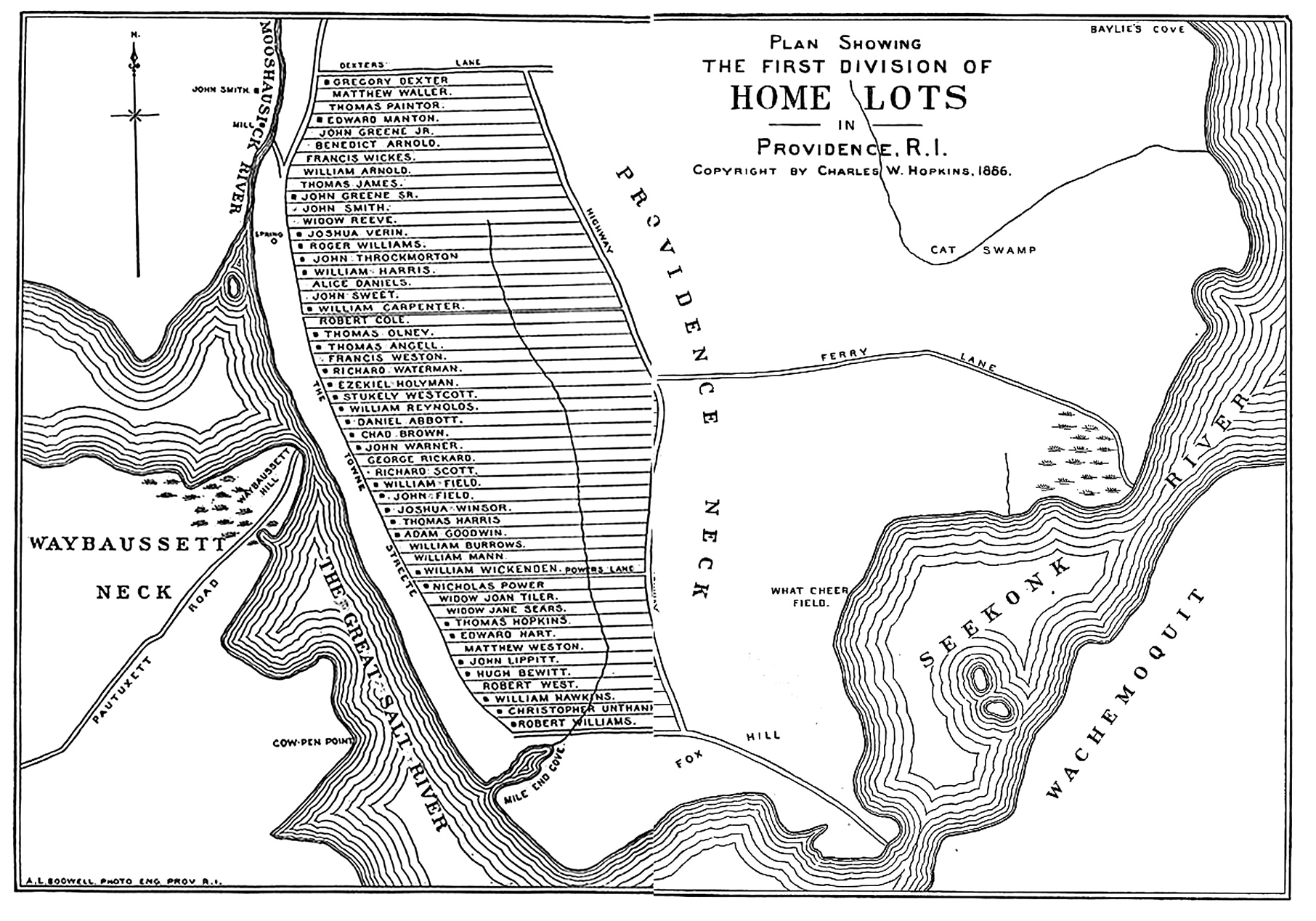
Original town layout of Providence Plantations, showing Westcott's lot near the middle, to the left of the letter "C" in the word "Providence"

Westcott first settled in the town of Salem in the Massachusetts Bay Colony where he was received as an inhabitant and made a freeman in 1636. In late 1637, he was granted a house lot in Salem, his family then consisting of eight members. Tensions quickly arose with the local authorities, however, and he was given license to depart Salem in March 1638, along with several others, with the provision that he would be summoned if not gone by a court date in May. Within weeks, he and his family joined Roger Williams and other settlers in establishing a new settlement on land that Williams had bought from the local Indians on the Narragansett Bay. The settlement was named Providence Plantations, and the initials S.W. for Stukely Westcott appear first on the deed signed by Williams, followed by the initials W.A. of his future in-law William Arnold.

In 1640, Westcott signed an agreement with 38 others to form a civil government in Providence. He lived there for a few years, but he was recorded as one of the inhabitants of Warwick in 1648. However, he had likely gone to Warwick shortly after its establishment by Samuel Gorton in 1642, and he may have been there as early as 1643. He lived in Warwick for most of the remainder of his life until the events of King Philip's War compelled him to move across the Narragansett Bay.

Westcott appears most often on the public records for Rhode Island between 1650 and 1660. He was a commissioner from Warwick during five different years, and he was a surveyor of highways during most of those years. In 1653, he had the position of assistant in the colony and was on a committee to confer with the Indians about fencing and other matters. Warwick settlers had been accused of treating the Indians unfairly, and Westcott and a Mr. Smith were ordered in 1655 to gather up compensation that was due the Indians. In 1660, he was the foreman of a grand inquest to look into the beating death of a local Indian.

In 1655, Westcott was appointed to keep a house of entertainment, and he again received authorization in 1664 for keeping "an ordinary for entertainment" while the King's Commissioners held court in Warwick.

== King Philip's War ==
One of the highest offices held by Westcott was Deputy to the General Court which he held during 1671 when he was nearly 80 years old. Within a few years, he was surrounded by the tumultuous events of King Philip's War which was the outcome of severe friction between several of the New England tribes and the colonists. The settlement of Warwick was totally destroyed, and the aged and infirm Westcott was taken to the settlement at Portsmouth on Rhode Island to the house of his grandson Caleb Arnold, the son of Governor Benedict Arnold. On January 12, 1677, he knew that the end of his life was near, and he drafted a will under the direction of his grandson. He did not sign it, however, expecting his sons to arrive from Prudence Island the next day. He died before they could get to his side, however, and the will was never signed. It was not until 20 years after his death that the will was approved and recorded into the town records. Shortly after his death, his remains were carried back to Warwick where he was buried by his wife on their old homestead.

== Children and descendants ==
Coat of Arms of Stukely Westcott

Stukely and Juliann Westcott had six children, but a baptismal record has only been found for the first two. The oldest child was Damaris, baptized at Yeovil on January 27, 1620/21. She married Benedict Arnold on December 17, 1640, the son of William and Christian (Peak) Arnold, and the couple had nine children. She died after 1678. Samuel was baptized at Yeovil on March 31, 1622, but he probably died before adulthood in New England. Robert married Catharine Rathburn and they had six children. He was a lieutenant who was killed in 1676 during King Philip's War. Amos (1631–1685) married Sarah Stafford on July 13, 1667, the daughter of Thomas and Elizabeth Stafford. He married Deborah Stafford on June 9, 1670, the sister of Sarah. He had one child with his first wife and five with his second.

Mercy married Samuel Stafford, son of Thomas and Elizabeth Stafford, and they had nine children. She died on March 25, 1700. Jeremiah married Eleanor England on July 27, 1665, daughter of William and Elizabeth England, and they had eight children. He died in 1686.

Notable descendants of Westcott through his daughter Damaris (wife of Governor Benedict Arnold) include great-great-grandson Benedict Arnold, the general during the American Revolutionary War who initially was a great leader, but who is now remembered for his treason and betrayal of his homeland and fellow American soldiers. Another descendant was Commodore Oliver Hazard Perry, American hero of the Great Lakes during the War of 1812. His younger brother Commodore Matthew C. Perry was sent by President Millard Fillmore to compel the opening of Japan to the West with the Convention of Kanagawa in 1854. Stephen Arnold Douglas debated Abraham Lincoln in 1858 before a senate race and later lost to him in the 1860 presidential election. Rhode Island colonial Deputy Governor George Hazard is another descendant.

== See also ==
- List of early settlers of Rhode Island

== Bibliography ==
=== References ===
- Arnold, Elisha Stephen (1935). The Arnold Memorial: William Arnold of Providence and Pawtuxet, 1587–1675, and a Genealogy of His Descendants. Rutland, Vermont: Tuttle Publishing Company. OCLC 6882845 – via Internet Archive.
- Arnold, Frederick Augustus (1935) [1921]. "William Arnold, Stukely Westcott and William Carpenter". In Arnold, Elisha Stephen (ed.). The Arnold Memorial: William Arnold of Providence and Pawtuxet, 1587–1675, and a Genealogy of His Descendants. Rutland, Vermont: Tuttle Publishing Company. pp. 9–39 – via Internet Archive.
- Arnold, Frederick Augustus (1921). "An Account of the English Homes of Three Early 'Proprietors' of Providence". Rhode Island Historical Society Collections. 14 (3). Rhode Island Historical Society: 75–76.
- Austin, John Osborne (1969) [1887]. The Genealogical Dictionary of Rhode Island (Revised ed.). Albany: Genealogical Publishing Company. ISBN 978-0-8063-0006-1.
- Bullock, Jonathan Russell (1886). Incidents in the life and times of Stukeley Westcote, with some of his descendants. Bristol: J. Russell Bullock (self-published, 50 copies).
- Moriarity, G. Andrews (April 1944). "Additions and Corrections to Austin's Genealogical Dictionary of Rhode Island". The American Genealogist. 20: 233.
- Whitman, Roscoe L.; Bullock, Jonathan Russell (1932). History and Genealogy of the Ancestors and Some Descendants of Stukely Westcott | One of the Thirteen Original Proprietors of Providence Plantation and the Colony of Rhode Island | With Special Mention of the Westcotts of Cheshire, Berkshire County, Massachusetts, and the Westcotts of Milford, Otsego County, New York and Some of the Allied Families | Incorporating, and Extending, the Research of the Late Hon. J. Russell Bullock of Bristol, R.I. Oneonta: Otsego Publishing Company. OCLC 46765127 – via Internet Archive.
- Whitman, Roscoe L. (1939). Book of Appendices to the History and Genealogy of the Ancestors and Some Descendants of Stukely Westcott, 1592–1677, Published in 1932. Oneonta, New York: Otsego Publishing Company. OCLC 865912887 – via Internet Archive.

=== Further reading ===
- Anderson, Robert Charles; Sanborn, George F. Jr.; Sanborn, Melinde L. (1999). The Great Migration, Immigrants to New England, 1634–1635. Vol. I A–B. Boston: New England Historic Genealogical Society. ISBN 0-88082-110-8. OCLC 62101862 See entry under "William Arnold".
