= William Carpenter (Rhode Island colonist) =

English colonist in North America (c. 1610–1685)

- Born: abt. 1610; Amesbury, Wiltshire, England
- Died: 7 September 1685; Providence, (Note: Pawtuxet section of then Providence, now in Cranston) Colony of Rhode Island and Providence Plantations
- Known for: First surnamed Carpenter to make permanent residence in America

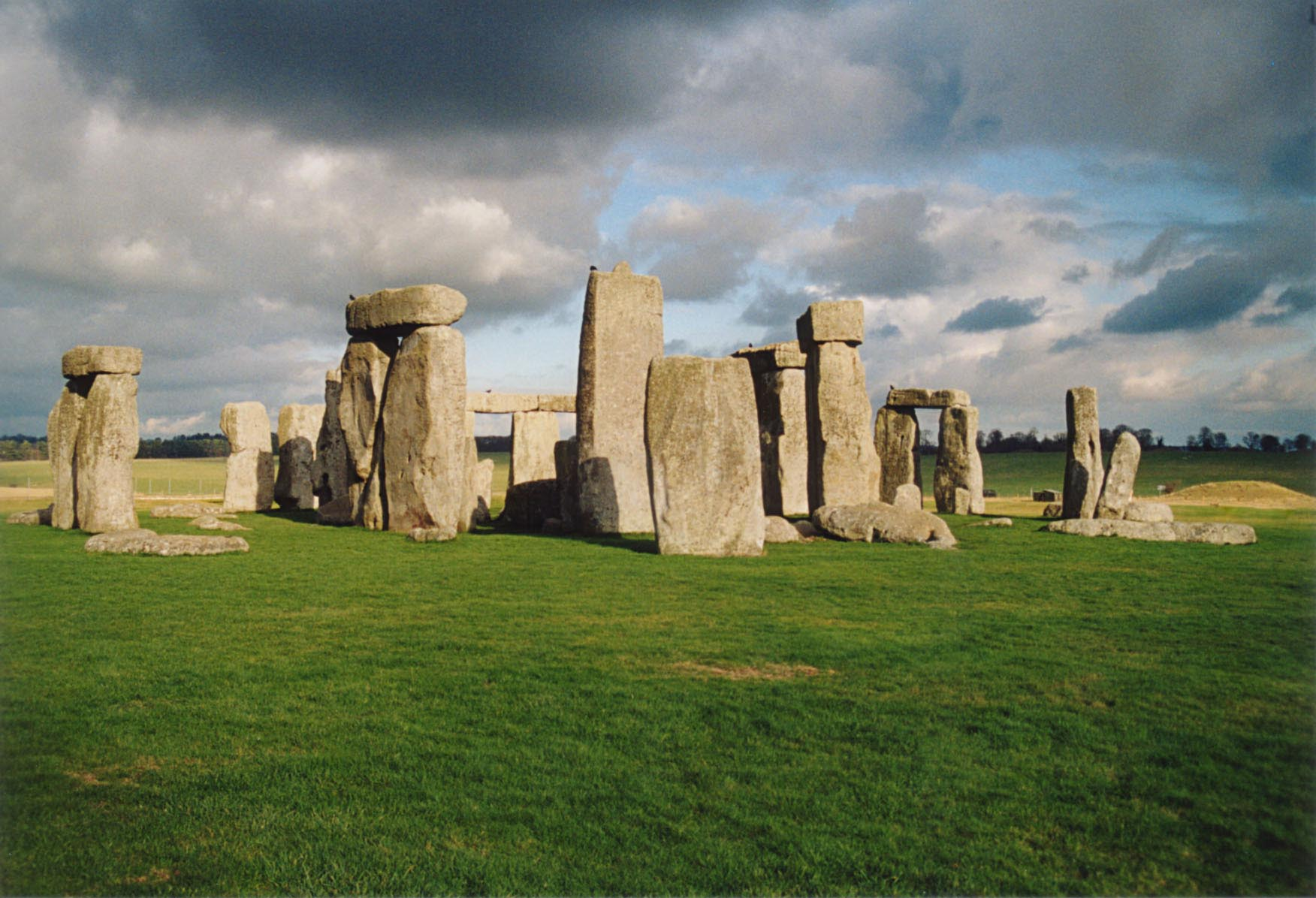
Stonehenge near Amesbury in Wiltshire, England

William Carpenter (c. 1610 – 7 September 1685) was a co-founder of the English Colony of Rhode Island and Providence Plantations, born about 1610, probably in Amesbury, Wiltshire, England. He died September 7, 1685, in the Pawtuxet section of Providence, now in Cranston, Rhode Island. He was listed by 1655 as a "freeman" of the colony.

== Life and career ==
William Carpenter was the son of Richard Carpenter, who was born in England, probably in or near the Wiltshire town and parish of Amesbury or the adjacent parish of Newton Ton(e)y. His mother may have been Alice Knight, but this is not confirmed.

William married Elizabeth Arnold (Nov 23, 1611 - after Sep 7, 1685), who was born in Ilchester, Somerset, England, the daughter of William Arnold (June 24, 1587 - 1675/76) and sister of Benedict Arnold, the first governor of the Colony of Rhode Island and Providence Plantations. William and Elizabeth had eight children together: Joseph, Lydia, Ephraim, Priscilla, Timothy, Silas, Benjamin, and William. The couple were probably buried on their homestead in present-day Cranston, Rhode Island.

William Carpenter is the first person bearing the surname "Carpenter" to make permanent settlement in America. He settled in Providence Plantation and was instrumental in its development as a Colony, holding many public offices.

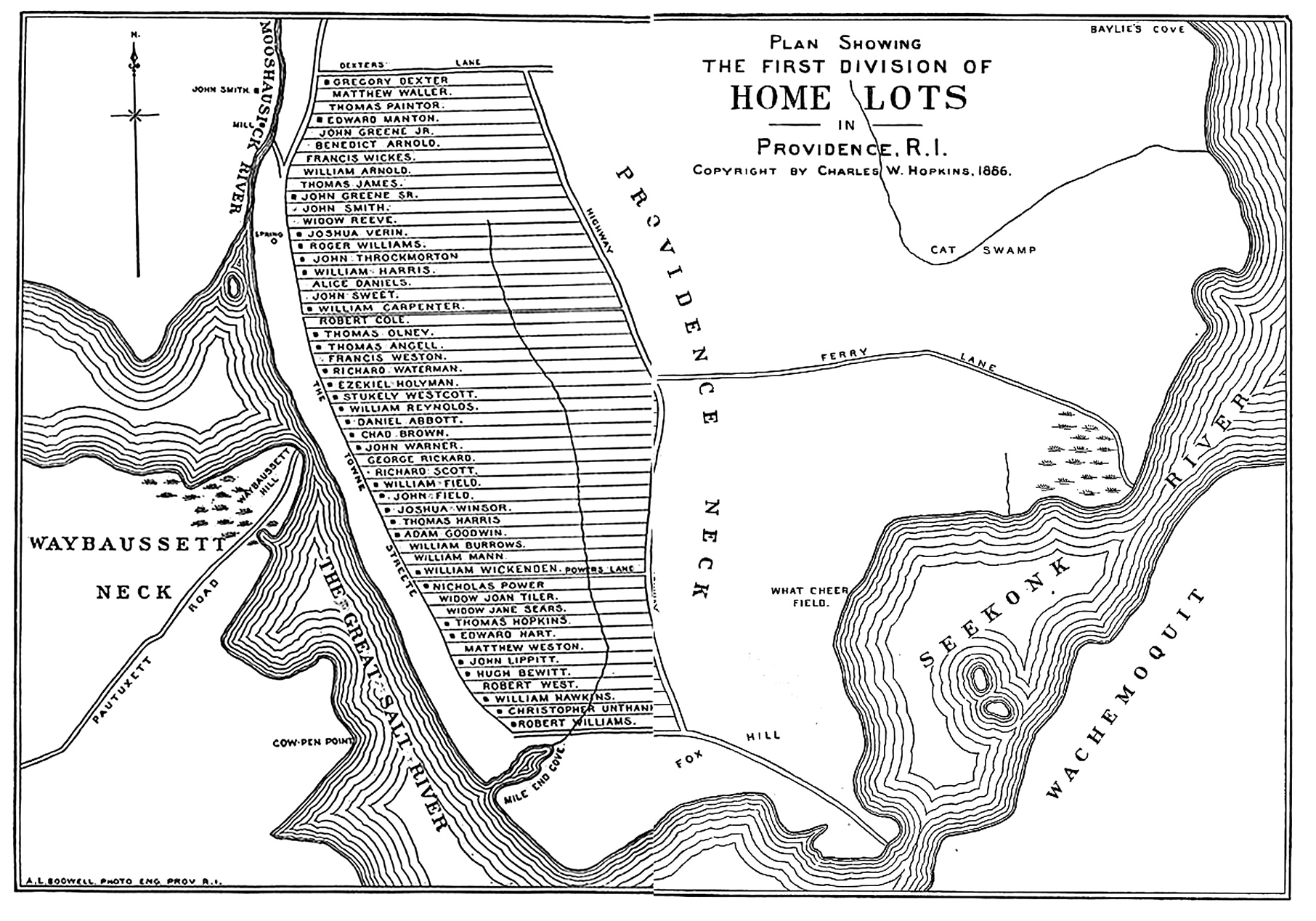
Original 1600s town layout of Providence, RI with many of the street names on the East Side named after the original homestead strip owners. William Carpenter's lot is left of the letter "D" in Providence Neck.

=== Providence Plantation ===
William Carpenter was not one of the first six settlers of Providence Plantation with Roger Williams in 1636, but he arrived early the next spring with seven others. His name is listed in the first deed executed in the settlement by Roger Williams. In 1640, his name appears with the names of 38 others on an agreement to form a government in Providence.

Carpenter built a block house on his property soon after settling there for defense against Indian attacks, the first in the colony. Many of the surviving Providence Plantation settlers gathered there for protection from an Indian attack during King Philip's War, and their brave stand compelled the Indians to retreat. Carpenter's son William Jr. was killed in the attack, along with many other settlers. During King Philip's War, the counsel of the most judicious inhabitants of the colony was sought by the General Assembly, and Carpenter was one of 16 individuals named in this request.

=== Public offices ===
William Carpenter was one of four appointed by Boston authorities "to keepe the peace in [Pawtuxet]," 1642[–1658?].

Commissioner (deputy?) for Providence to Rhode Island General Court Assembly
1657-1665, 1675, 1676, 1679.

Appointed juror, General Court of Trials
1657/8 (but did not serve), 1661[/2], 1663, 1664; juror for Grand Inquest, 1658/9, 1663, 1665; then warden (magistrate) for General Court of Trials, 1660/1.

Providence town meeting moderator
June 1662, June 1665, September 1665, April 1666, September 1666, October 1670, December 1670, February 1670/1, April–September 1671.

General assistant for Providence to Rhode Island General Assembly
1665-1672.

Providence justice of the peace
1665/6, 1667, 1668 and officiated marriages from his office as an assistant for the Providence to the Rhode Island General Assembly from 1669-1671/72.

Providence town councilman
January 1670/1, June 1673.

Section References:

== See also ==
- List of early settlers of Rhode Island

== Bibliography ==
- Bremer, Francis J. (1995). The Puritan Experiment: New England Society from Bradford to Edwards. Lebanon: University Press of New England. ISBN 978-0-87451-728-6.
- Bridenbaugh, Carl (1974). Fat Mutton and Liberty of Conscience: Society in Rhode Island, 1636–1690. Providence: Brown University Press. ISBN 978-0-87057-143-5.
  - The Bridenbaugh volume is a good general introduction to Rhode Island history but nevertheless misinterprets Weeden (Early RI 87) in saying that, to build William Harris's Pawtuxet house, William Carpenter was brought from Amesbury in Massachusetts Bay Colony (see Bridenbaugh 38, 141).
- Brockunier, Samuel Hugh (1940). The Irrepressible Democrat Roger Williams. New York: The Ronald Press Company. LCCN 40-31938.
- Daniels, Bruce C. (1983). Dissent and Conformity on Narragansett Bay: The Colonial Rhode Island Town. Middletown: Books on Demand. ISBN 978-0-608-03570-3.
- DeJohn Anderson, Virginia (1992) [1991]. New England's Generation: The Great Migration and the Formation of Society and Culture in the Seventeenth Century. Reprint. New York: Cambridge University Press. ISBN 978-0-521-44764-5.
- Foster, Stephen (1996). The Long Argument: English Puritanism and the Shaping of New England Culture. Chapel Hill: University of North Carolina Press. ISBN 978-0-8078-4583-7.
- Harris Papers, Collections of the Rhode Island Historical Society, vol. 10 (Providence, 1902);
- Keary, Anne (1996). "Retelling the History of the Settlement of Providence: Speech, Writing, and Cultural Interaction on Narragansett Bay". The New England Quarterly. 69: 250–86.
- Rubertone, Patricia E. (2001). Grave Undertakings, An Archeology of Roger Williams and the Narragansett Indians. Washington, D.C.: Smithsonian Institution Press. ISBN 978-1-56098-975-2.
- Staples, William R. (1843). Annals of the Town of Providence. Providence: Knowles and Vose.
- Trevor-Roper, Hugh (2000) [1940]. Archbishop Laud: 1573–1645 (Reprint ed.). London: Orion Publishing Group. ISBN 978-1-84212-202-0.
- Williams, Roger (1988). LaFantasie, Glenn W. (ed.). The Correspondence of Roger Williams. Providence: University Press of New England . ISBN 978-0-87451-386-8.
- Wrightson, Keith; Levine, David (1995). Poverty and Piety in an English Village: Terling, 1525–1700. Oxford: Oxford University Press. ISBN 978-0-19-820321-6.
