= Benedict Arnold (governor) =

Rhode Island statesman (1615–1678)

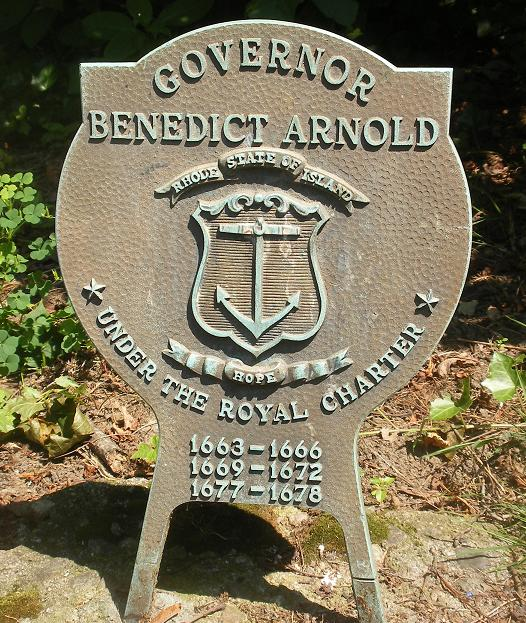
- Governor Benedict Arnold grave medallion

10th and 12th President of the Colony of Rhode Island and Providence Plantations
- In office 1657–1660
- Preceded by: Roger Williams
- Succeeded by: William Brenton
- In office 1662–1663
- Preceded by: William Brenton
- Succeeded by: Himself (as Governor)

1st, 3rd, and 7th Governor of the Colony of Rhode Island and Providence Plantations
- In office 1663–1666
- Preceded by: Himself (as President)
- Succeeded by: William Brenton
- In office 1669–1672
- Preceded by: William Brenton
- Succeeded by: Nicholas Easton
- In office 1677–1678
- Preceded by: Walter Clarke
- Succeeded by: William Coddington

Personal details
- Born: 21 December 1615 Ilchester, Somerset
- Died: 19 June 1678 (aged 62) Newport, Rhode Island
- Resting place: Arnold Burying Ground, Pelham St., Newport
- Spouse: Damaris Westcott
- Children: 9
- Parent(s): William Arnold; Christian Peak
- Relatives: Benedict Arnold (great-grandson)
- Occupation: Interpreter; commissioner; statesman

Benedict Arnold (December 21, 1615 – June 19, 1678) was president and then governor of the Colony of Rhode Island and Providence Plantations, serving for a total of 11 years in these roles. He was born and raised in the town of Ilchester, Somerset, England, likely attending school in Limington nearby. In 1635 at age 19, he accompanied his parents, siblings, and other family members on a voyage from England to New England where they first settled in Hingham in the Massachusetts Bay Colony. In less than a year, they moved to Providence Plantation at the head of the Narragansett Bay at the request of Roger Williams. In about 1638, they moved once again about five miles (8 km) south to the Pawtuxet River, settling on the north side at a place commonly called Pawtuxet (now Cranston). Here they had serious disputes with their neighbors, particularly Samuel Gorton, and they put themselves and their lands under the jurisdiction of Massachusetts, a situation which lasted for 16 years.

Arnold learned the Indian languages at an early age and became one of the two leading interpreters in the Rhode Island colony (Roger Williams being the other). He was frequently called upon to interpret during negotiations with the Indians, but they accused him of misrepresentation on one occasion.

In 1651, Arnold left Providence and Pawtuxet with his family, settling in Newport where he began his public service, which lasted continuously until his death. He became a freeman, Commissioner, and Assistant, and he succeeded Roger Williams as president of the colony in 1657, serving for three years. In 1662, he was once again elected president, and Williams brought the Royal Charter of 1663 from England in the second year of this term, naming him as the first governor and offering broad freedoms and self-determination to the colony.

Arnold was a bold and decisive leader. He was elected for two additional terms as governor, the last time following the devastation of King Philip's War. He died on June 19, 1678, while still in office and was buried in the Arnold Burying Ground located on Pelham Street in Newport. In his will, he left his "stone built wind mill" to his wife, which still stands as an important Newport landmark. His many descendants include General Benedict Arnold, notorious for his treason during the American Revolutionary War, and Senator Stephen Arnold Douglas who debated Abraham Lincoln in 1858 and lost to him during the 1860 presidential election.

== Early life ==
Arnold was born December 21, 1615, in Ilchester, Somerset, England, the second child and oldest son of William Arnold and Christian Peak. He was likely educated at the Free Grammar School associated with the parish church in Limington, slightly more than one mile (1.6 km) to the east of Ilchester. This ancient school is where Thomas Wolsey was the curate and schoolmaster from 1500 to 1509. Wolsey became the Lord Cardinal and Primate of England.

The Arnold family emigrated to New England when he was 19 in the spring of 1635 and made the trip from Ilchester to Dartmouth on the coast of Devon. He wrote in a family record, "Memorandom my father and his family Sett Sayle from Dartmouth in Old England, the first of May, friday &c. Arrived in New England June 24o Ano 1635." It is possible that Stukely Westcott of Yeovil was on the same ship with his family, including his daughter Damaris, age 15 and Arnold's future wife.

Upon their arrival in New England, the Arnolds joined a group of settlers from Hingham, Norfolk, England, where they established the town of Hingham in the Massachusetts Bay Colony. Arnold received title to a house lot in September 1635, but Roger Williams persuaded him and others the following spring to join him in establishing a new settlement named Providence Plantation at the head of a river that flows into the Narragansett Bay. The younger Arnold wrote in the family record that they "came to Providence to Dwell the 20th of April, 1636." Arnold received a house lot on what is now North Main Street in Providence, and his father was granted the second lot south of his.

== Providence and Pawtuxet ==
In 1637, Arnold was one of 13 settlers who signed a compact subjecting themselves to any agreements made by a majority of the masters of families. About 1638, he accompanied his father, his brother-in-law William Carpenter, and Robert Coles in a move about five miles (8 km) south to the Pawtuxet River. The settlement was called Pawtuxet and was still within the jurisdiction of Providence Plantation; it later became a part of Cranston, Rhode Island. On July 17, 1640, Arnold signed an agreement with 38 other Providence residents to form a more compact government "to preserve the peace and insure the prosperity of a growing community." It did neither, especially after the arrival of Samuel Gorton, who Roger Williams wrote was "bewitching and bemadding poor Providence." In one incident, "Upon the attempt to enforce the execution of an award against Francis Weston made by eight men orderly chosen, Gorton, with many of his followers, assailed the representatives of law and order making a tumultuous hubbub." Arnold wrote a petition with 12 others dated November 17, 1641, in which they formally applied to Massachusetts for help, asking the government there to "lend us a neighborlike helping hand." Massachusetts replied that they could not help unless the complainants fell under their jurisdiction.

The Arnolds, Coles, and Carpenter were highly offended by Gorton, who had moved with some of his adherents to Pawtuxet. They went to Boston and submitted themselves to the government and jurisdiction of Massachusetts on September 2, 1642. They were received by the General Court there and appointed justices of the peace. In doing this, these settlers allowed a foreign jurisdiction into the midst of the Providence government, a condition that lasted for 16 years. Gorton was unhappy about being under the jurisdiction of Massachusetts and moved with his followers another 12 miles (19 km) farther south, settling beyond the limits of Massachusetts' jurisdiction at a place called Shawomet.

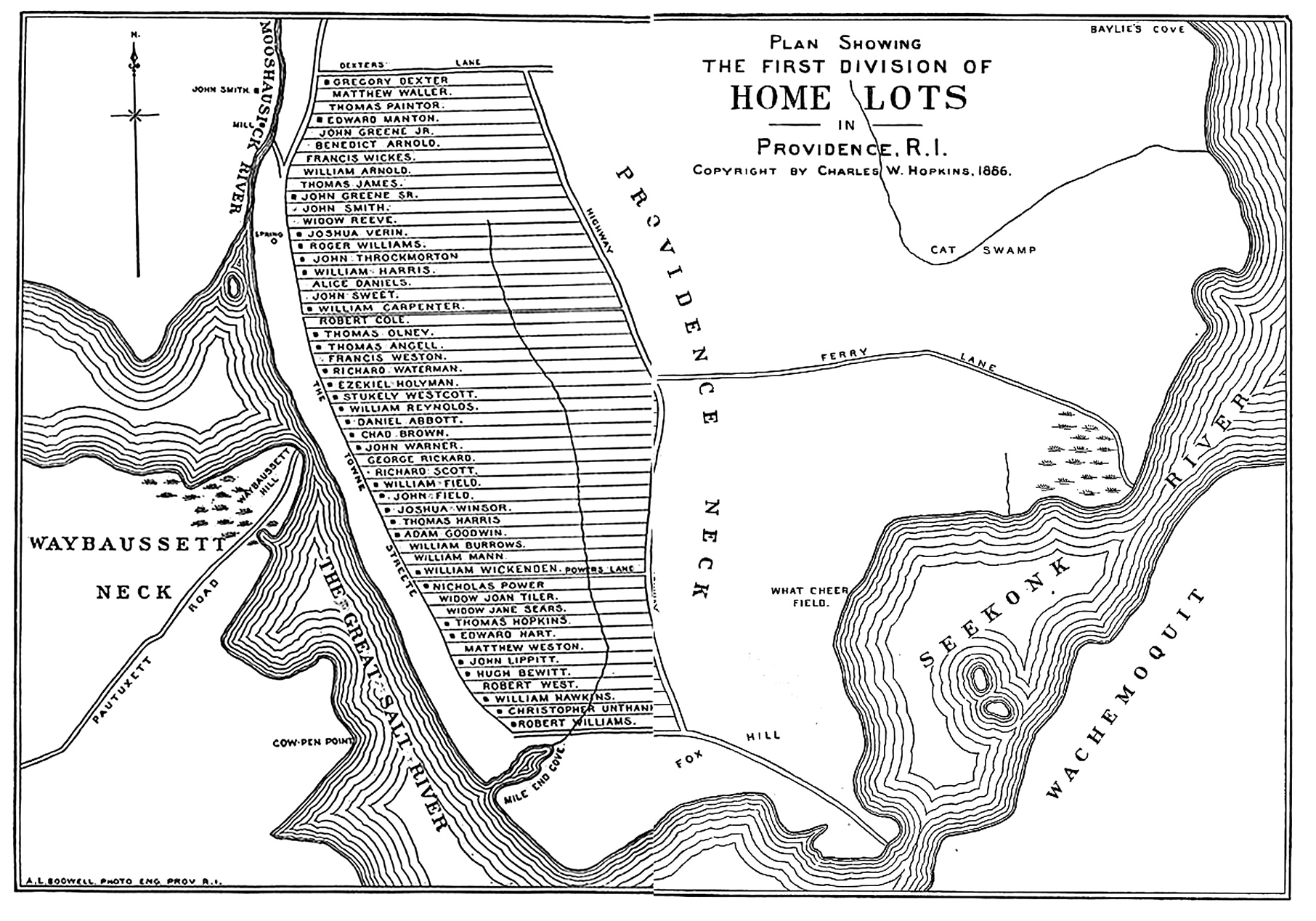
Original town layout of Providence showing Arnold's lot, sixth from the top

Arnold and his father had already become proficient in the Narragansett and Wampanoag languages, and both harbored an intense dislike of Gorton. They devised a scheme to undermine their adversary and to simultaneously obtain extensive lands from the local Indians. Gorton had purchased Shawomet from Miantonomi, the chief sachem of the Narragansett people. Minor sachems Ponham and Sacononoco had some control of the lands at Pawtuxet and Shawomet, and Arnold, acting as interpreter, took these chieftains to Governor John Winthrop in Boston and had them submit themselves and their lands to Massachusetts, claiming that the sale of Shawomet to Gorton was done "under duress." Now with a claim to Shawomet, Massachusetts directed Gorton and his followers to appear in Boston to answer "complaints" made by the two minor sachems. When Gorton refused, Massachusetts sent a party to Shawomet to arrest him and his neighbors. The ensuing trial had nothing to do with the land claims, but instead focused on the writings and beliefs of Gorton, for which he and others in his group were imprisoned. Ultimately, Gorton was released and went to England where he was given legal title to his lands from the Earl of Warwick, and he renamed the settlement of Shawomet to Warwick in his honor.

Arnold was the only member of the colony besides Roger Williams who was highly proficient in the Narragansett and Wampanoag tongues, and he was often called upon to interpret during negotiations. In June 1645, the General Court of Massachusetts sent him to the Narragansetts to urge them to desist from engaging in a war with the Mohegans. On July 28, Arnold and two others were sent to get the hostile tribes to send deputies to Boston to talk and make peace. This attempt failed and, a month later, Arnold would not go back again, as he had been charged with misrepresenting the reply of the tribes, and Roger Williams went as interpreter in his place.

The issue of the Pawtuxet settlers remaining under the jurisdiction of Massachusetts was a constant irritant to Roger Williams, Gorton, and the other Providence and Warwick settlers. The General Court of Rhode Island met at Warwick on May 22, 1649, and ordered that letters be sent to Arnold and the other Pawtuxet settlers in reference to their subjecting themselves to the Rhode Island colony. This did not happen, and the Pawtuxet settlers continued under Massachusetts for another nine years. Arnold and his father had extensive land holdings, and Arnold paid a tax of five pounds in 1650, the highest in the colony, and his father paid three and a half pounds, the second highest amount.

In June 1650, Roger Williams wrote to Governor Winthrop in Massachusetts saying that Arnold had bought a house and land at Newport with the intention of moving there. His reasons for moving were not revealed in his own writings, but some historians have suggested that mercantile interests compelled the move, while others have suggested political interests or a desire to get away from the hostile atmosphere of Providence and Pawtuxet.

== Newport and politics ==
In 1651, Arnold left Providence and Pawtuxet for Aquidneck Island (which was officially called Rhode Island at the time), settling in Newport. He recorded in the family record, "Memorandum. We came from Providence with our family to Dwell at Newport in Rhode Island the 19th of November, Thursday in afternoon, & arrived ye same night Ano. Domina 1651". With only a few exceptions, men from Newport held the reins of power for the first century of Rhode Island history. The first settlers came to Aquidneck in 1638, and they organized a quarterly court and English-style jury trial. In 1640, Newport established monthly courts, rights of appeal, and trial by jury, whereas in Providence there was no court, no judge, and no jury.

Significant political events were taking place upon Arnold's arrival in Newport. William Coddington had been successful in separating the island towns of Newport and Portsmouth from the two mainland towns of Providence and Warwick under a commission which he obtained earlier in England; he was appointed as governor for life of the two island towns in 1651. Providence sent Roger Williams to England, feeling that the Patent of 1643 had been abandoned, and those on the island who were opposed to Coddington sent Dr. John Clarke and William Dyer to have Coddington's charter annulled. Williams and Dyer returned to New England after finding success, while Clarke remained there for the next decade, acting as a diplomat to protect the colony's interests. In February 1653, Dyer brought letters revoking Coddington's commission, with the authority of the government to proceed under the Patent of 1643 and the status quo of 1647. John Sanford succeeded Coddington in 1653, and the four towns were reunified under one government.

In 1653, Arnold became a freeman of Newport and served in some public capacity every year until his death in 1678. In 1654, he was selected as one of the commissioners from Newport (each of the four towns had six), and he was an Assistant from 1655 to 1656. He was very active as a member of the Court of Commissioners and a member of the most important committees. In 1655, Arnold, Roger Williams, Samuel Gorton, and William Baulston were appointed by the court to frame a letter of thanksgiving to the English Lord President of the council on colonial affairs, and to present humble acknowledgments and submission of the colony to the Lord Protector Oliver Cromwell. The letter of reply from Cromwell was placed in the custody of Arnold.

Arnold was elected as the President of the colony in 1657 at age 41, succeeding Roger Williams.

=== Terms as president ===
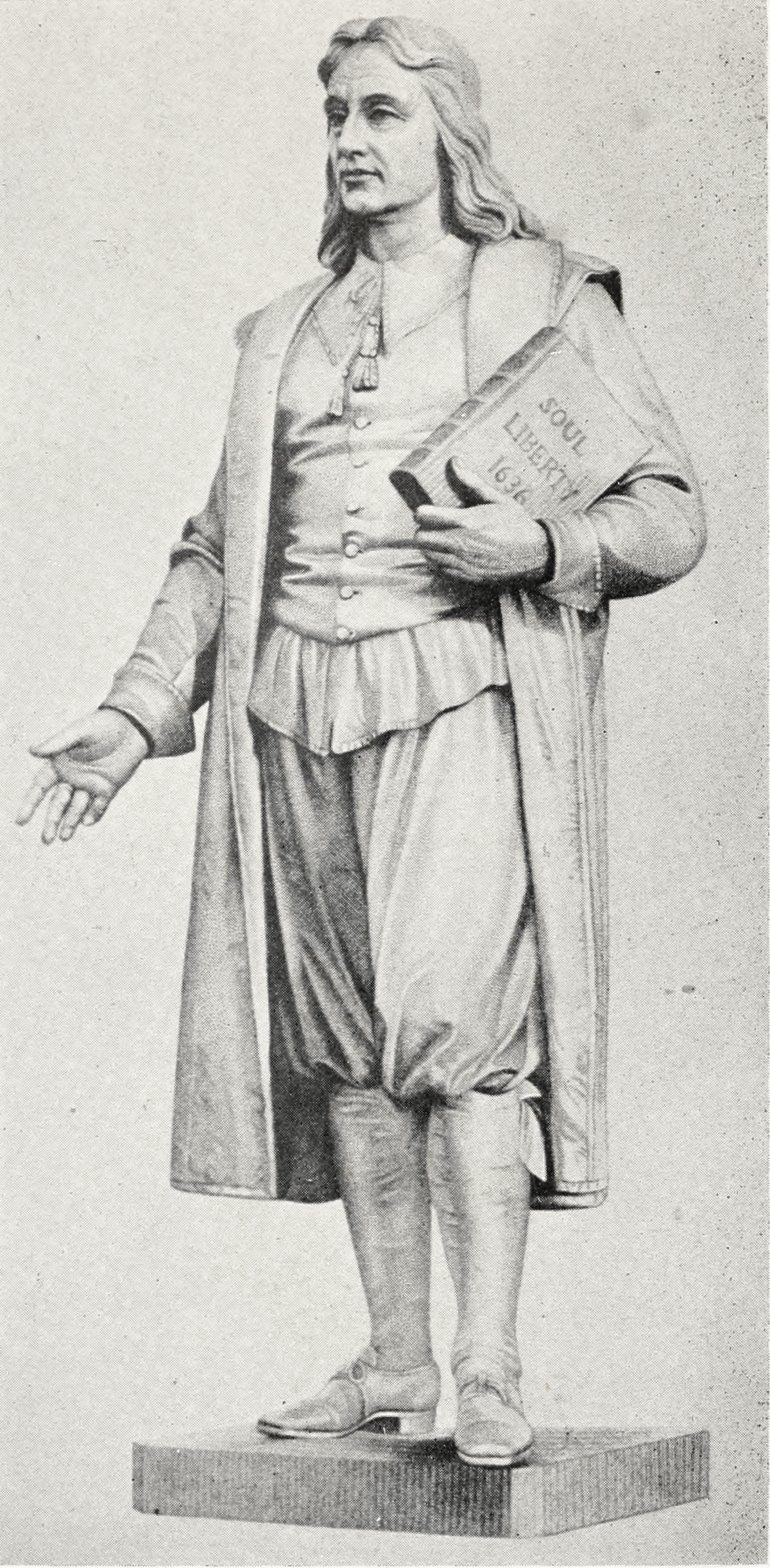
Arnold succeeded Roger Williams as President of the colony in 1657

Arnold became president at a crucial time in Rhode Island's history. Tremendous political change was occurring in England, and this resulted in significant changes and opportunities for the Colony of Rhode Island and Providence Plantations, which was constantly being harassed by its larger neighbors Massachusetts and Connecticut. Oliver Cromwell had been ruling in England since the overthrow and execution of King Charles I in 1649, but his death in 1658 marked the restoration of the monarchy, and Charles II ascended to the throne. The Colony of Rhode Island was quick to adjust to the new political reality, and the General Court of Commissioners met at Warwick on October 18, 1660, where two letters were read, one from Dr. Clarke telling of the Restoration, and one from His Majesty containing the royal declaration and proclamation. Leaders in the colony set aside a special day of proclamation so that the colonists could recognize the new king.

William Brenton succeeded Arnold as president in 1660, but Arnold continued as a Commissioner for many years, as well as an Assistant from 1660 to 1661. In these roles, he headed a committee to draft and send a new commission to Dr. Clarke, giving due credit to the King's father Charles I for the Patent of 1643 which gave the Colony of Rhode Island and Providence Plantations its official existence. He spoke of "sundry obstructions" stemming from "claims of neighbors about us," referring to interests that both the Massachusetts Bay Colony and Connecticut Colony had on the greater Narragansett Bay area. The document went on to include Dr. Clarke as the agent and attorney for the colony, and used deferential language toward "his most gracious and regall Majesty, Charles the Second, by the Grace of God, the most mighty and potent King of England."

In this commission, the four towns of the Rhode Island colony declared their "unfayned affection" for the new king. The commission also armed Dr. Clarke with what he needed to fulfill his mission. He wrote a letter on behalf of the colony asking for an experiment in liberty where the colony would become "a Republic of Liberty under Law, in which every man is king and no man subject."

=== Dealings with the Quakers ===
The United Colonies of Massachusetts, Plymouth, New Haven, and Connecticut announced the arrival of the Quakers in a letter in 1658, calling them notorious heretics and urging their speedy removal from the colonies. They wanted the Quakers removed from Newport, and used the threat of withholding trade as leverage. Arnold was no friend of the Quakers, but his reply demonstrated a firm adherence to the Rhode Island doctrine of religious tolerance which was endorsed by the Assistants from each town. He wrote, "Concerning these Quakers (so-called), which are now among us, we have no law among us, whereby to punish any for only declaring by words, &c., theire mindes and understandings concerning the things and days of God, as to salvation and an eternal condition." He went on to say that the Quakers find a "delight to be persecuted by civill powers," thus gaining more adherents to their cause. He felt that their doctrines tended to be very absolute, "cutting down and overturning relations and civil government among men."

President Arnold promised Massachusetts Governor Simon Bradstreet that the Quakers' "extravagent outgoinges" would be considered at the next session of the General Assembly, and he hoped that some action would be taken to prevent the "bad effects of their doctrines and endeavors." At the March 1658 session, the Assembly reaffirmed the Rhode Island doctrine of "freedom of different consciences", and they sent a letter to the Commissioners stating that the matter would be presented to the supreme authority of England if troubles arose from harboring Quakers. The United Colonies made no further complaint.

=== Terms as governor ===
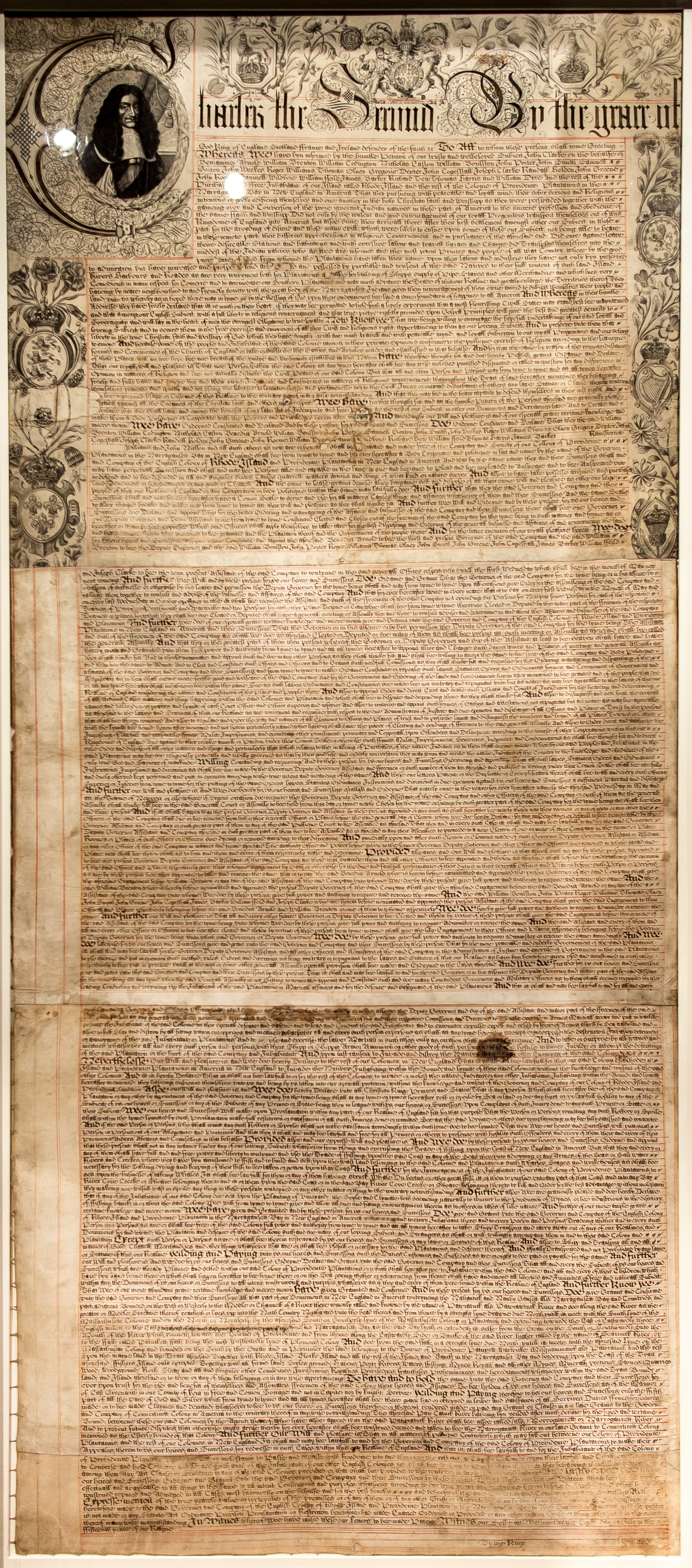
The Royal Charter of 1663 named Arnold as the first governor of the colony.

In 1662, Arnold was once again elected president of the colony, and Clarke's earlier diplomacy came to fruition in the second year of this term with the Royal Charter of 1663, which historian Thomas Bicknell describes as "the grandest instrument of human liberty ever constructed." Under this instrument, Arnold became the first governor of the Colony of Rhode Island and Providence Plantations, with William Brenton as his Deputy. The Court of Commissioners was replaced with a legislature of ten Assistants and a House of Deputies, with six from Newport and four each from Providence, Portsmouth, and Warwick. One of Arnold's first acts as governor was to address a letter to Connecticut Governor John Winthrop, Jr. about running a line between the two colonies as provided by the Charter.

In 1664, members of the Royal Commission of 1664 came to Rhode Island to settle claims of jurisdiction over the Narragansett country, specifically addressing rival claims between the Rhode Island and Connecticut colonies over land at Westerly and the settlement at Wickford. The commissioners were able to forestall a major confrontation, but no substantial changes were made, and the disputes between the two colonies continued for the next 50 years. The King's Commissioners also appointed Arnold as a justice of the peace and a magistrate of the "King's Province", now Washington County, Rhode Island.

In the election of 1666, Arnold retired from office and was succeeded once again by William Brenton. Nevertheless, he and others were compelled to sit in the Assembly as deputies "as the Court due desire their assistance." In 1669, Arnold was again chosen as governor, and he was re-elected in 1670 when the controversy became acute with Connecticut over disputed lands in King's Province and Westerly. On July 11, 1670, Arnold sent a strong letter to Connecticut's Governor Winthrop informing him of Rhode Island's determination to appeal to King Charles concerning "invasions and intrusions upon the lands and government of this Colony." There is no record, however, of this threat being carried out.

During this administration, the Quakers were finding the religious tolerance of Rhode Island to be a fertile ground for their missionaries, and they also found a safe haven from other colonies here. They found success in the spread of their religion and became a strong political force, as well. Arnold was once again elected governor in 1671 but the governorship went to Quaker Nicholas Easton in 1672, and the Quakers held the reins of power for three of the next five years. Arnold, however, had left a positive mark on the colony, after more than ten years of leadership, and the disorganized and fragmentary governments of the four towns were united and put in order, with courts established and an organized society put into motion.

=== Business and land interests ===
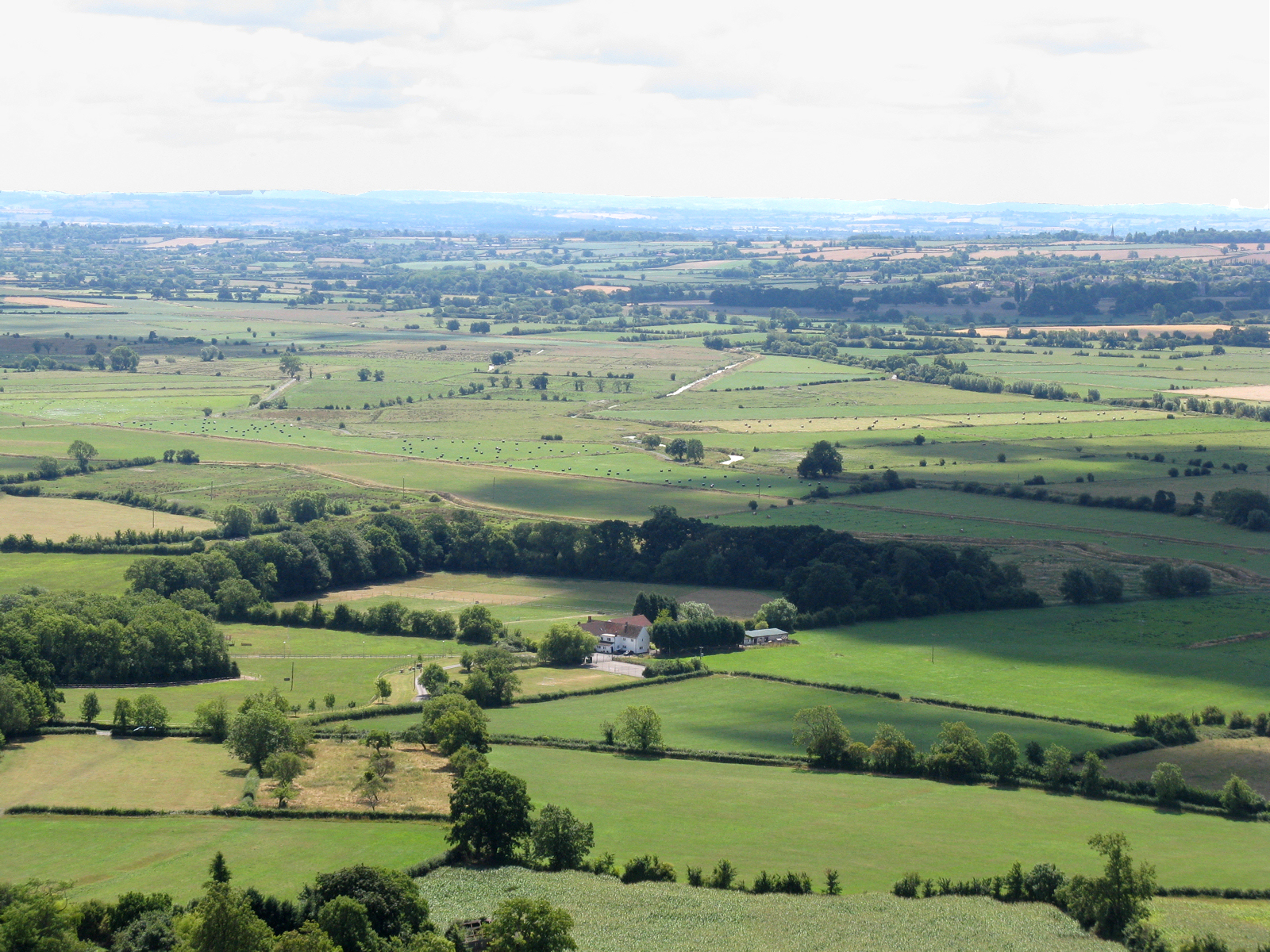
Arnold's New England property called "Lemmington Farm" was named after Limington in Somerset.

Arnold's usefulness had been in great demand for the welfare of the colony, and his successful political career was mirrored by equally successful agricultural and mercantile pursuits. While living at Pawtuxet, he became an agent for arms, ammunition, and liquors, and he had an establishment on the Warwick side of the river offering Boston goods and provisions in demand at the time. In his book Simplicities Defense, Samuel Gorton complained that Arnold constantly traded with the Indians on the Sabbath day and was too liberal in providing them with powder. He further complained that Arnold would not sell items to the Warwick settlers unless they submitted themselves to the jurisdiction of Massachusetts. The Warwick settlers also complained that he furnished the Indians with strong drink and wine, which was forbidden by the Warwick town council.

After leaving the governorship in 1672, Arnold likely attended to his commercial interests, and he was said to be the wealthiest person in the colony. He had a wharf and warehouse mentioned in his will, and he had commercial interests in the West Indies, evident from a 1674 letter that he wrote to his son-in-law Roger Goulding, urging him to complete his business in the Barbados.

Arnold held several parcels of land in and around Newport, one of which he called his "Lemmington Farm," which was named after the village of Limington in his native Somerset, England. In 1657, he was one of about a hundred individuals who purchased Conanicut Island, the second largest island in the Narragansett Bay where the town of Jamestown is now located. He and John Greene also acquired Goat Island and Coaster's Harbor Island, which later became the property of the town of Newport.

Some time after January 1658, he and six others held equal shares of interest in a company that bought a large tract of land in the Narragansett country known as the Pettaquamscutt Purchase, a tract that became South Kingstown. He held this until his death, when the property was bequeathed to his three sons Benedict, Josiah, and Oliver. He also owned two parcels of land in Newport, one where his wharf and warehouse were located, and the other the site of his mansion house.

=== King Philip's War ===
King Philip's War (1675–76) left the mainland towns of Rhode Island in ruins, "the most disastrous conflict to ever devastate New England." This confrontation between several tribes and the Colonists was named for Metacomet, sachem of the Wampanoags, who was also called Philip. The Rhode Island colony was much more at peace with the Indians than the other colonies, yet it bore the brunt of damage because of its location at the geographical center of conflict; the settlements of Warwick and Pawtuxet were totally destroyed, with much of Providence destroyed, as well. Several of Arnold's relatives lived in these areas and fled to Long Island, and his aged father was moved from Pawtuxet to his brother's garrison house, but he did not survive the conflict.

In April 1676, the Assembly voted "that in these troublesome times and straits in this Colony, this Assembly desiring to have the advice and concurrence of the most judicious inhabitants, if it may be had for the good of the whole, do desire at their next sitting the company and counsel of Mr. Benedict Arnold" and 15 others. Quakers were noted for their pacifism, and Quaker Governor Walter Clarke was in office during the war. The so-called "war party" was successful in the election of 1677, and Arnold was voted back into office as governor.

During this term, Arnold's health began to fail, but he was still re-elected in May 1678. He was too ill to leave his house, and his deputy governor John Cranston transacted the colony's business, along with two assistants and a recorder, by visiting him at home. His health did not improve, and he died within a month of his last election to governor.

== Death and legacy ==
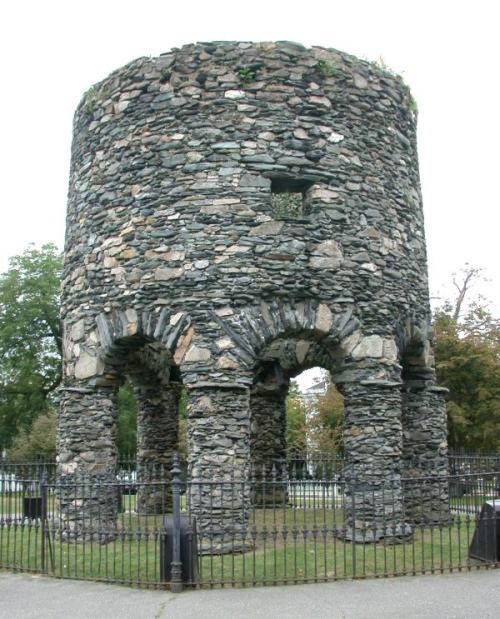
The Newport Tower which Arnold called his "stone built wind mill"

Arnold wrote his will on December 24, 1677, during his last full term as governor. He added a codicil the following February, and died in June while still in office. On June 29, Samuel Hubbard of Newport wrote to Dr. Edward Stennett of London, "Our Governor died the 19th day of June, 1678, buried 20th day, all this island was invited, many others was there, judged near a thousand people, brother Hiscox spoke there excellently led forth, I praise God." In his will, Governor Arnold gave land to his wife with mansion house and "stone built wind mill." There are romantic legends of early Norsemen coming to Newport and building the stone structure that continues to stand in the city, but the strongest evidence suggests that it was the base of Arnold's windmill mentioned in his will.

Benedict Arnold, his wife, and many of his family are buried in the Arnold Burying Ground located on Pelham Street in Newport. For many years, the cemetery was buried under a garden in the back yard of a residence, but a major renovation began in 1949 whereby all the stones were unearthed, cleaned, and returned to their original positions. There is no inscription on the slabs covering the graves of Arnold and his wife, but his grave is marked with a governor's medallion.

Lieutenant Governor and Rhode Island historian Samuel G. Arnold wrote of him:

That he was no friend of the doctrines, or advocate of the conduct of the followers of Fox [Quakers] is evident from his writings; but that like Williams, he recognized the distinction between persecution and opposition, between legal force and moral suasion as applied to matters of opinion, is equally apparent. In politics and in theology he was alike the opponent of Coddington and the friend of John Clarke and throughout his long and useful life he displayed talents of a brilliant order which were ever employed for the welfare of his fellow men.

== Family and descendants ==
Arnold married Damaris on December 17, 1640, the daughter of Stukely Westcott and Julianna Marchante. They had nine children: Benedict, Caleb, Josiah, Damaris, William, Penelope, Oliver, Godsgift, and Freelove. All but William grew to adulthood, married, and had children. Godsgift married Jireh Bull, the grandson of governor Henry Bull.

Notable descendants of Benedict Arnold through his son Benedict include his great-grandson, also named Benedict Arnold, the general of the American Revolutionary War who is remembered primarily for his treason to America when he switched sides to fight with the British. Descendants through his son Caleb include Commodore Oliver Hazard Perry, American hero of the Great Lakes during the War of 1812, and his younger brother Commodore Matthew C. Perry, who compelled the opening of Japan to the West with the Convention of Kanagawa in 1854. Senator Stephen Arnold Douglas is also descended through this line, who debated Abraham Lincoln in 1858 before a senate race and later lost to him in the 1860 presidential election. Rhode Island colonial Deputy Governor George Hazard is another descendant.

== Ancestry of Benedict and Damaris Arnold ==
Ancestors of Benedict Arnold (governor)

8. Nicholas Arnold (c. 1550–1622)
4. William Arnold (settler) (1587–1676)
18. John Gully (c.1508–1591)
9. Alice Gully (1553–1596)
19. Alice (c.1510–1583)
2. Benedict Arnold (governor) (1615–1678)
10. Thomas Peak
5. Christian Peak (1584-c. 1659)
1. Children of Benedict & Damaris Arnold
6. Stukely Westcott (1592–1677)
3. Damaris Westcott (1621 – after 1678)
28. John Marchante (died 1593)
14. John Marchante (b. 1571)
29. Eva Corninge (born c. 1550)
7. Juliann Marchante (born c. 1600)

== See also ==
- List of colonial governors of Rhode Island
- Newport Tower (Rhode Island)
- Colony of Rhode Island and Providence Plantations
- List of early settlers of Rhode Island
