= William Arnold (settler) =

Founding settler of the Colony of Rhode Island and Providence Plantations

- Born: 24 June 1587; Ilchester, Somerset, England
- Died: c. 1676 (aged 88); Pawtuxet, Rhode Island
- Occupations: Church warden; interpreter; commissioner; land holder
- Spouse: Christian Peak (daughter of Thomas Peak of Muchelney in Somerset)
- Children: Elizabeth, Benedict, Joanna, Stephen
- Parents: Nicholas Arnold; Alice (Gully) Arnold

William Arnold (24 June 1587 – c. 1676) was one of the founding settlers of the Colony of Rhode Island and Providence Plantations, and he and his sons were among the wealthiest people in the colony. He was raised and educated in England where he was the warden of St. Mary's, the parish church of Ilchester in southeastern Somerset. He immigrated to New England with family and associates in 1635. He initially settled in Hingham in the Massachusetts Bay Colony, but he soon relocated to the new settlement of Providence Plantation with Roger Williams. He was one of the 13 original proprietors of Providence, appearing on the deed signed by Roger Williams in 1638, and was one of the 12 founding members of the first Baptist church to be established in America.

After living in Providence for about two years, Arnold moved with his family and others to the north side of the Pawtuxet River forming a settlement commonly called Pawtuxet, later a part of Cranston, Rhode Island. He and his fellow settlers had serious disputes with their Warwick neighbors on the south side of the river and, as a result, separated themselves from the Providence government, putting themselves under the jurisdiction of the Massachusetts Bay Colony. This separation from Providence lasted for 16 years, and Arnold was appointed to keep the peace as the head of the settlement. He died sometime during the great turmoil of King Philip's War in 1675 or 1676. His son Benedict succeeded Roger Williams as President of the Colony of Rhode Island and Providence Plantations in 1657, and he became the first Governor of the colony under the royal charter of 1663.

== Early life ==
William Arnold was born in Ilchester, Somerset, England on 24 June 1587 to Nicholas Arnold (c. 1550–1623)^{[a]} by his first wife Alice Gully (1553–1596). In about 1610, he married Christian Peak who was baptized 15 February 1584,^{[b]} the daughter of Thomas Peak of Muchelney, Somerset, a village about six miles (9.7 km) west of Ilchester.

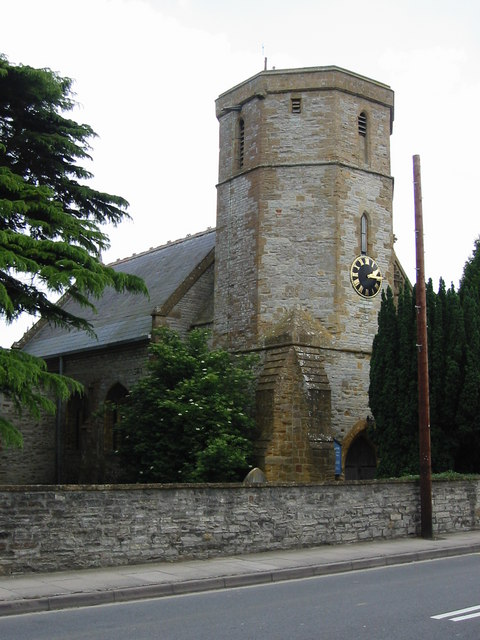
Church of St. Mary Major, Ilchester, where Arnold was the warden in 1622.

Arnold's parents lived in the small village of Northover, located across the River Yeo (also known as the River Ivel) from the town of Ilchester. His father was a tailor, and he evidently was prominent in his work and likely a member of the Tailor's Guild, which carried professional and political clout in its day. After the baptism of his oldest daughter Thomasine in 1572,^{[c]} Nicholas moved with his small family from Northover across the river to the much larger town of Ilchester where he became well established in his trade, and where the remainder of his children were born.

Arnold's mother Alice was the daughter of John Gully (c. 1508–1559) and his wife Alice (c. 1510–1583) of Northover. She died in 1596 shortly after childbirth when Arnold was eight years old, and he was thereafter largely raised and influenced by his sister Joanne who was ten years older than he. Joanne eventually married William Hopkins of Yeovilton and died at an early age in England. Her children Francis Hopkins and Thomas Hopkins immigrated to New England with Arnold.

Arnold and his siblings were likely educated at the Free Grammar School associated with the parish church in Limington, slightly more than a mile to the east of Ilchester. This ancient school is where Thomas Wolsey was the curate and schoolmaster from 1500 to 1509. Wolsey later became the Lord Cardinal and Primate of England.

Only two records for Arnold are known to exist while he still lived in England. The first of these was a transcript of baptisms, marriages, and burials that he signed in 1622 as the warden of St. Mary's, the parish church of Ilchester. The other record mentioning his name was the will of his father Nicholas Arnold, dated 18 January 1623.^{[a]} There is no record of Arnold between 1623 and his sailing to New England in 1635.

Arnold was an educated man; he had to be able to read and write as the warden of his parish church, and appears to have had a secure relationship with his church and community. Unknown are his motives for emigrating from England or when he began planning to do so, but his plan materialized in 1635.

== Voyage to New England ==
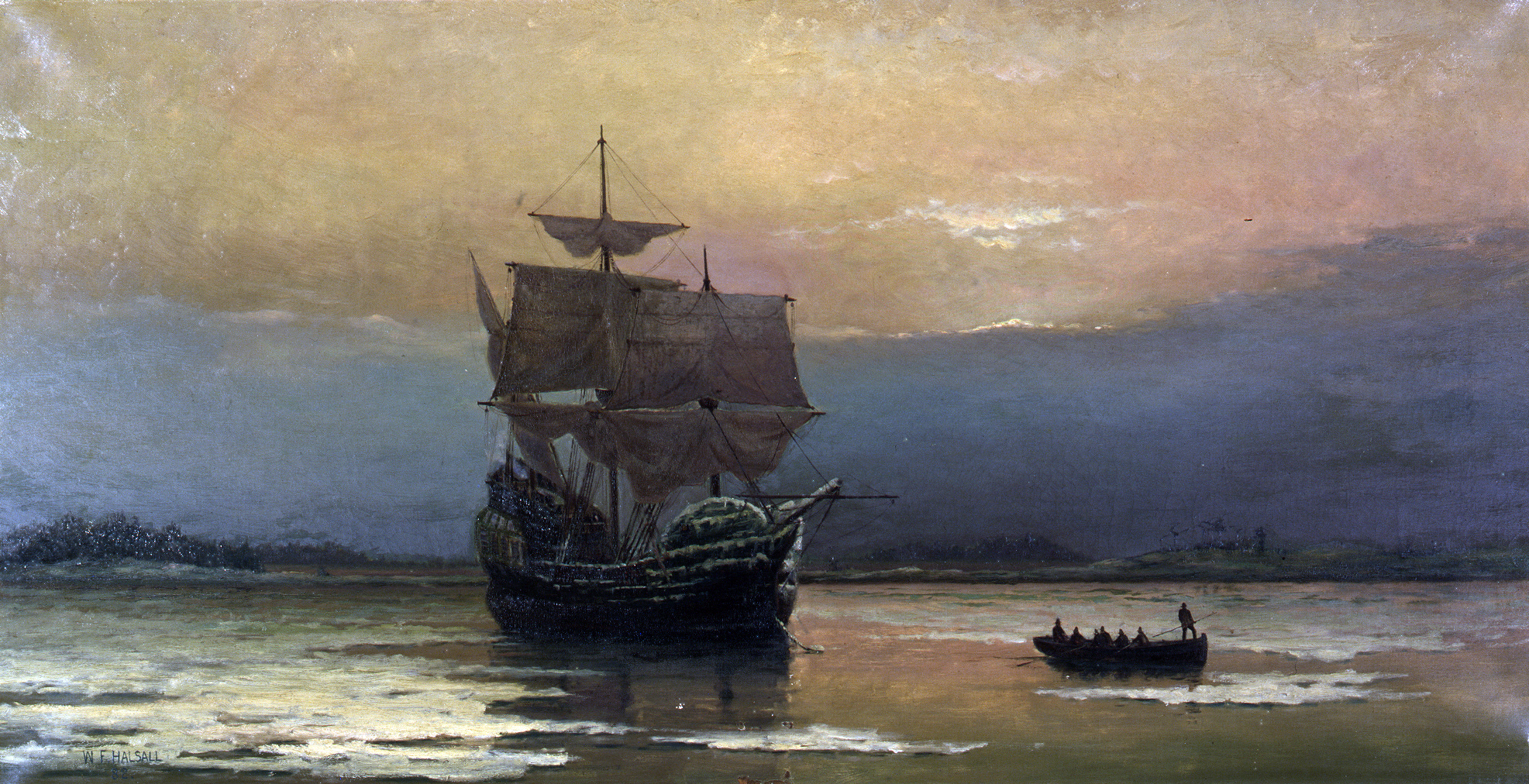
The Mayflower sailed from southwestern England 15 years earlier than the Arnolds. Painting by William Halsall (1882)

Arnold gathered members of his immediate family and other relatives and associates in the spring of 1635, together with their baggage and supplies, and made the trip from Ilchester to Dartmouth on the coast of Devon. The exact route of the travelers was not recorded, but a probable path was through Yeovil, Crewkerne, and Axminster to Exeter. From there, the party likely turned south along the Devonshire coast, traveling through Teignmouth and Torquay to the port city of Dartmouth.

Fred Arnold provided a perspective of the group in 1921, as they prepared to load their ship destined for the New World:

While their eyes rested upon these last scenes in the home land, the... young people... were perhaps thinking more of the village greens of Ilchester and Yeovil... and their playmates from whom they were now separated... while the older ones were more likely turning their thoughts toward the unknown sea with some doubts and misgivings mayhap, but yet with stout hearts and strong hopes facing the great adventure that lay before them in a new world.

The ship carrying William Arnold and his group sailed from England to New England in 1635, with some brief particulars of the voyage given by his son Benedict in the family record: "Memorandom my father and his family Sett Sayle from Dartmouth in Old England, the first of May, friday &c. Arrived In New England June 24 Ano 1635". The name of the ship was not recorded, nor has it been identified since. Governor Winthrop recorded that 15 ships arrived in the Massachusetts Bay area in the six-week period beginning 4 June 1635, but he gave the names of only two of them.

The ship on which the Arnolds sailed was not the Plain Joan, as is stated in some accounts, which carried a Thomas Arnold from England to Virginia.^{[d]} There is no known record of any event that took place at sea, only the length of the trip. The journey to America was less than two months in duration and ended on William Arnold's 48th birthday.

== Settling Providence and Pawtuxet ==
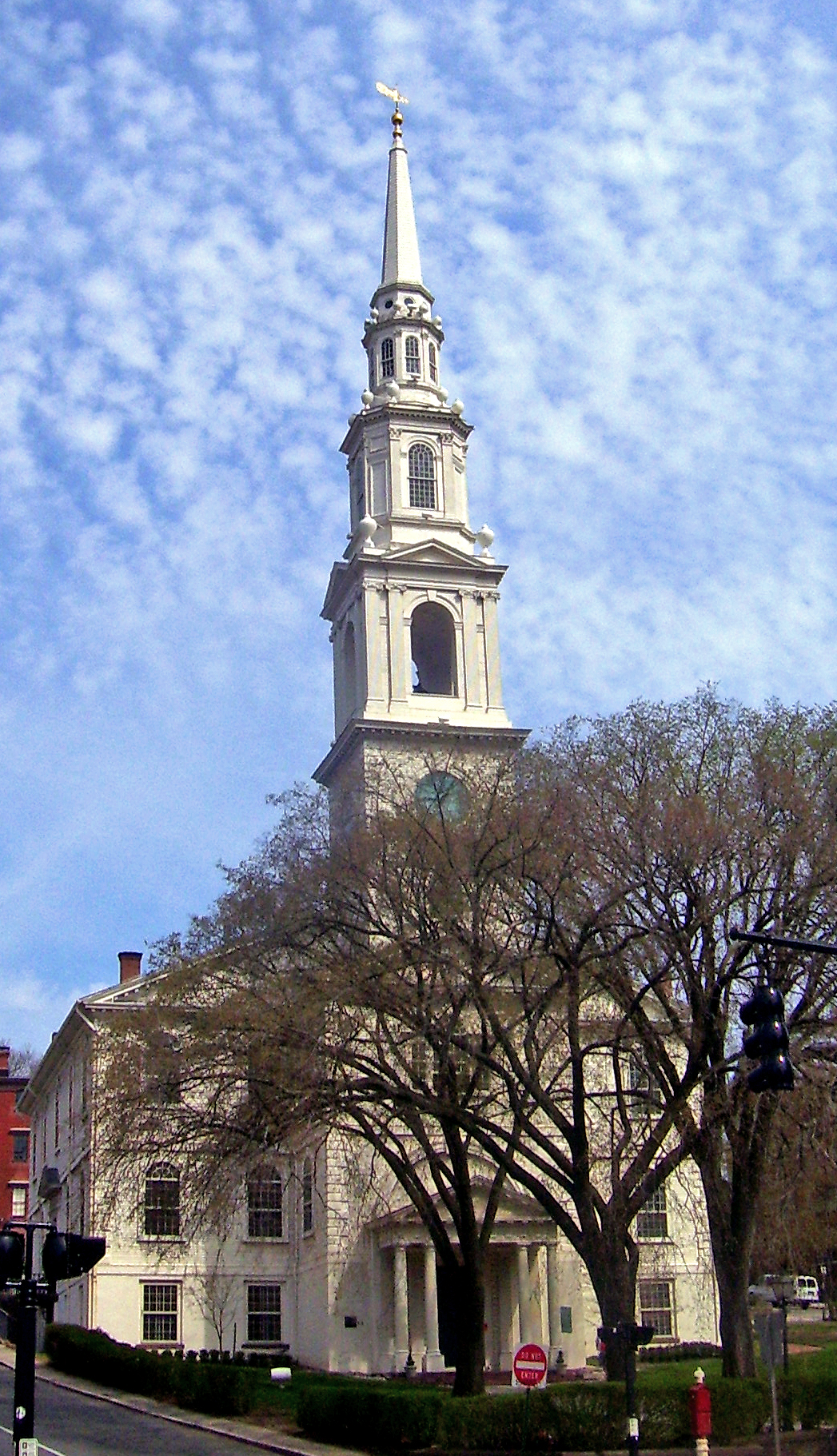
First Baptist Church in America, Providence, where Arnold was a founding member

Once in New England, Arnold joined a group of settlers from Hingham, Norfolk, England who established the new settlement of Hingham in the Massachusetts Bay Colony. On 18 September 1635, the town of Hingham gave Arnold a 2-acre (8,100 m^{2}) house lot "lying in the Town Street."

According to historian John Barry, William Arnold was banished from Hingham for reasons that were not religious, but he does not give the actual reason, nor does he cite any sources. Years later, Arnold's son Benedict recorded in the family record: "Memm. We came to Providence to Dwell the 20th of April, 1636. per me Bennedict Arnold." William Arnold stated in 1659: "for as much that I was one that the very first day entred [sic] with some others upon the land of providence, and so laid out my money to buy and helpe pay for it".

Arnold became one of the 13 original proprietors of Providence, and his initials appear second on the "initial deed" signed by Roger Williams in 1638, following the initials of Stukely Westcott, the future father-in-law of his son Benedict. He was assigned a house lot on what became North Main Street, but his stay was short in this part of Providence. In 1638, just two years after his arrival, he became caught up in a bitter dispute over a woman named Jane Verin, who had fled her husband's domestic abuse. Williams insisted that Jane had the right to leave her husband as a matter of freedom of conscience, but Arnold countered that Jane was defying her husband's authority over her. Williams wrote to Massachusetts Bay governor John Winthrop to warn him that Arnold was writing slanderous letters about the case.

Soon Arnold, his wife and children, his son-in-law William Carpenter, his nephew Thomas Hopkins, and a few associates and all their families moved four miles (six km) south to the Pawtuxet River around 1638, at the far southern edge of Williams's Providence purchase. They settled at the ford where the Pequot Trail crossed the river, close to where the Warwick Avenue (US Hwy 1A/Hwy 117) bridge crosses the river in the town of Cranston. Here Arnold remained until the end of his life. This was before a dividing line had been created between the two localities, and he physically resided at the location called Pawtuxet, although he continued to be referred to in some deeds as "of Providence" even after his move there. The break with Roger Williams eventually caused Pawtuxet to be treated as an independent settlement, as below.

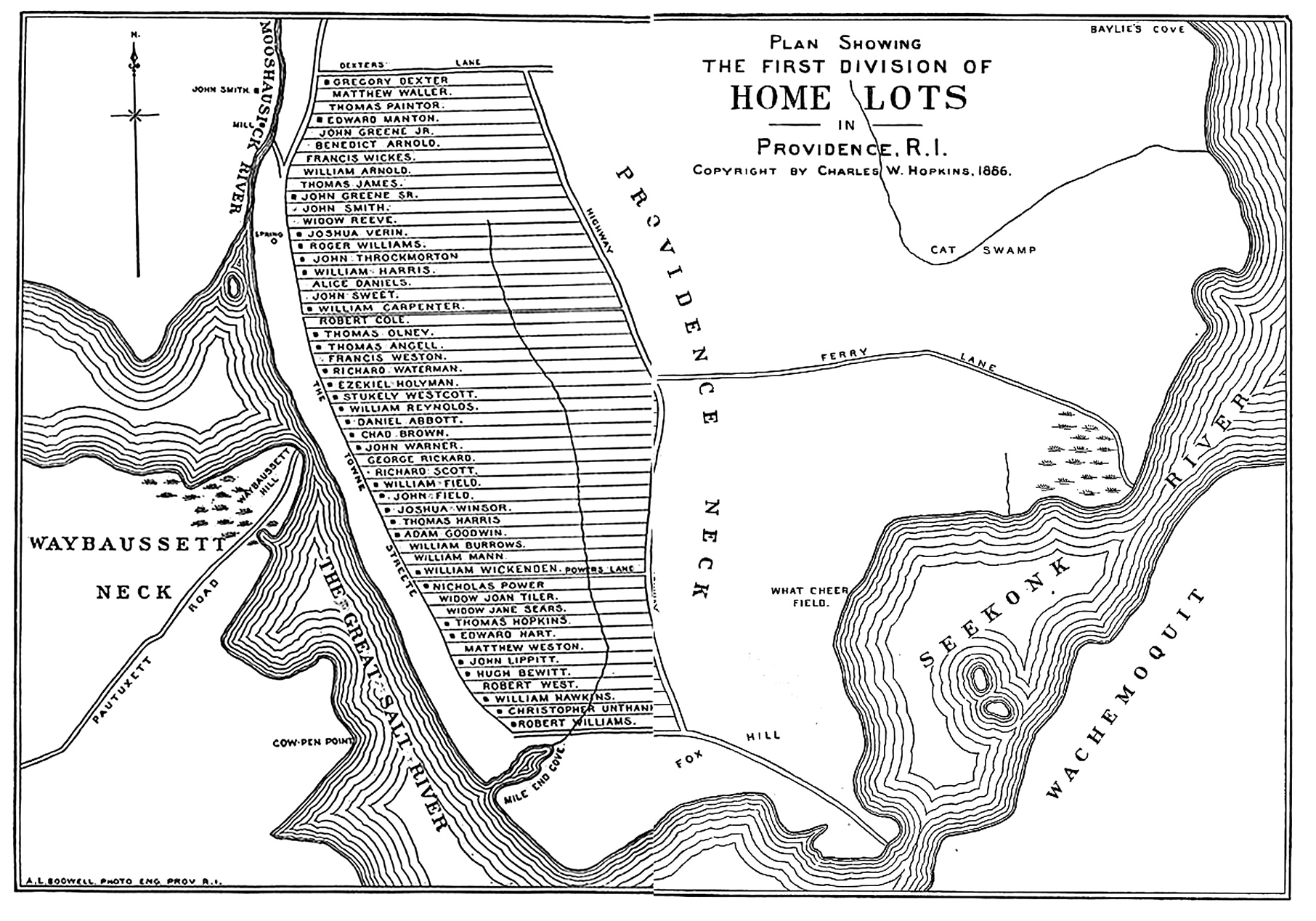
Town layout of Providence. Arnold's lot is left of the letter P in the word "Providence."

Arnold had been important to his church in England, and Samuel Gorton writes in Simplicity's Defence that Arnold had been a great professor of religion in the west of England. Once in the New World, he became one of the original 12 members to organize the first Baptist Church in Providence, founded by Roger Williams in 1638. This church was also the first Baptist church established in America.

Arnold had a good relationship with the Narragansett people and, according to Elisha Stephen Arnold's family genealogy (1935), "he felt for the Indians a conscientious kindliness and in his dealings with them was actuated by a sense of strictest justice." Like Roger Williams, he also made an effort to learn their language and acted as interpreter many times; he was paid 26 shillings for his services in one instance. Being able to communicate with the Indians also enabled him to buy large tracts of land from them, and soon he and his sons owned nearly 10,000 acres (40 km^{2}). In 1650, he paid taxes amounting to more than three and a half pounds, and his son Benedict paid five pounds—the highest taxes paid in the colony, implying that the Arnold family was among the wealthiest families in the colony in terms of land holdings.

== Difficulty with the Gortonites ==
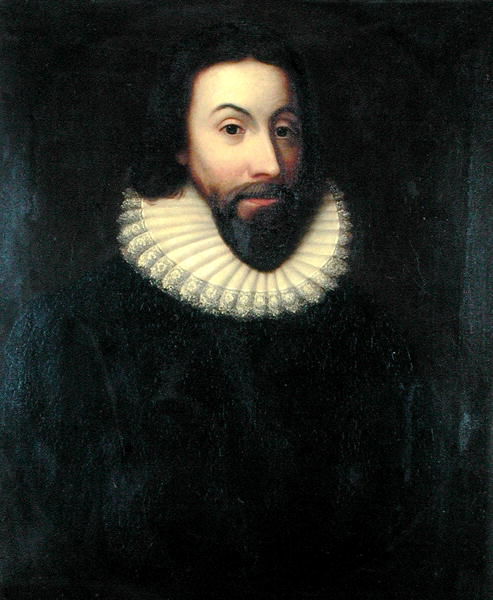
John Winthrop, Governor of the Massachusetts Bay Colony, to whom Arnold wrote a letter, complaining of the Gortonites' treatment of the Indians.

In 1641, the Pawtuxet settlers complained to the Massachusetts authorities of their neighbors in Warwick, the so-called Gortonites led by Samuel Gorton. Gorton had been causing disturbances for several years and had already been evicted from several places for creating difficulties which centered around his religious beliefs, insubordination towards the magistrates, refusal to pay taxes, and his dealings with and treatment of the Indians. The Massachusetts authorities replied that they were unable to help because the Pawtuxet settlement fell under the jurisdiction of neither the Massachusetts Bay Colony nor the Plymouth Colony. As a result, William Arnold and other Pawtuxet settlers subjected themselves to the Massachusetts government in 1642, with Arnold appointed to keep the peace. This separation from Providence lasted for 16 years.

One of the primary reasons for the separation from Providence was dissension over admitting Samuel Gorton and his Warwick friends to equal rights in Providence. After being evicted from other places, Gorton attempted to join in the Providence government, but the Pawtuxet settlers wanted no part of him or his followers. One cause of dissatisfaction was Gorton's treatment of the Indians. Arnold felt a strong affinity towards the Narragansett people, having acquired their language, and he accused Gorton and the other Warwick settlers of showing injustice to the Indians in a long letter to Governor John Winthrop of Massachusetts in 1648.

Arnold was so unhappy with the conduct of the Gortonites that he wrote to Massachusetts protesting Roger William's proposed errand to England to seek a charter for the colony. In this letter, he spoke in very uncomplimentary terms of the Warwick settlers: "under the pretense of liberty of conscience about these parts there came to live all the scum and runaways of the country, which in time for want of better order may bring a heavy burden on the land." These sentiments dissipated over time. Gorton's objectionable activities ceased following an appeal to the Massachusetts government, and he accepted Arnold's ownership of disputed land. The Pawtuxet settlers expressed the desire to reunite with Providence, finally able to coexist with Gorton, and it was done in 1658.

== End of life ==
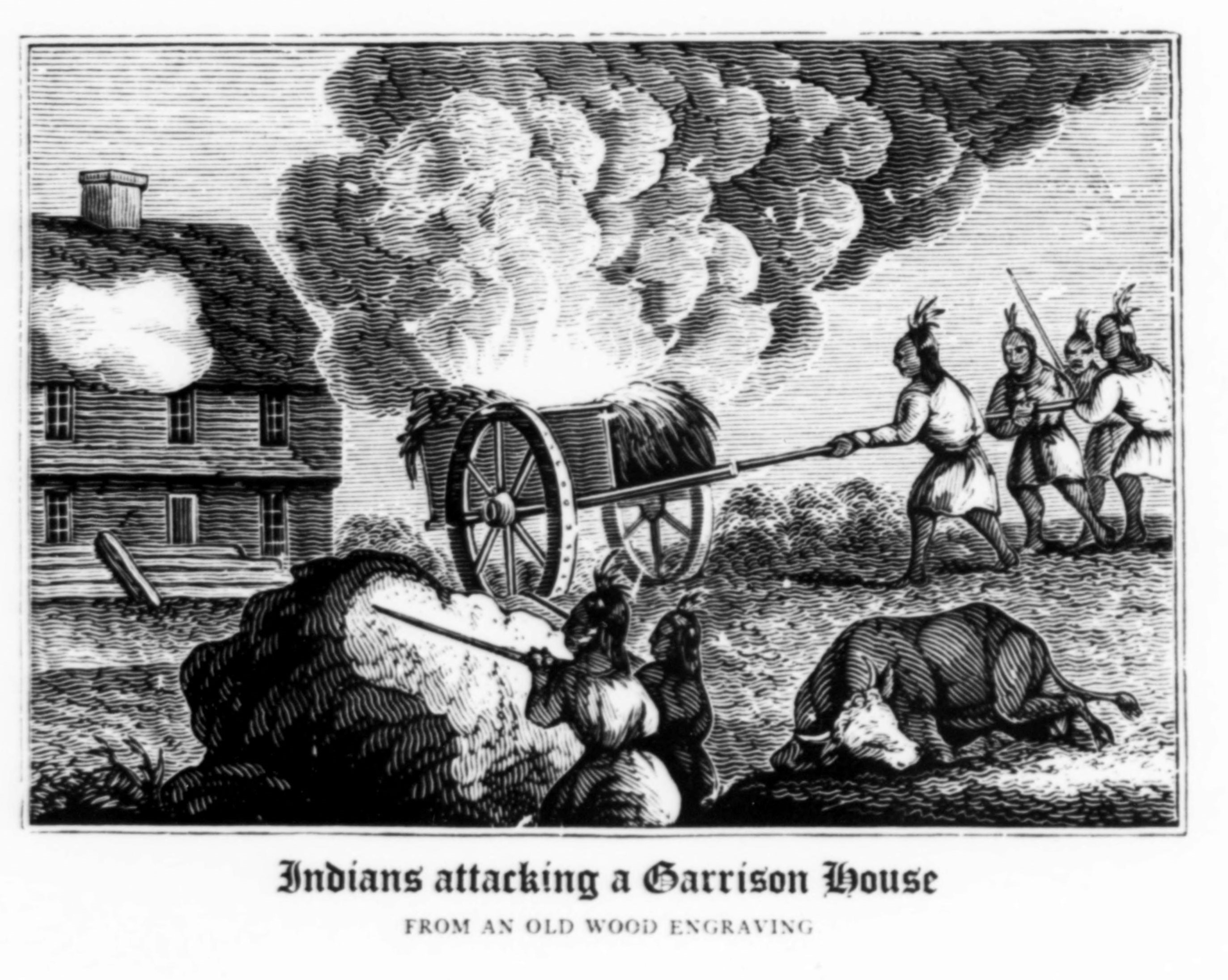
The settlements of Pawtuxet, Warwick, and Providence were largely destroyed in 1676 during King Philip's War.

William Arnold continued to reside in Pawtuxet during the two decades following Pawtuxet's reunification with Providence. He was a party to several land transactions where he deeded away some of his properties. Here he lived in relative peace until July 1675, when King Philip's War erupted into a major confrontation between the Indians and the English settlers. Pawtuxet was not a safe place to be, but Arnold refused to go to his son Benedict's house in Newport, nor would he go up to Providence. He was eventually persuaded to go to his son Stephen's garrison house farther up the Pawtuxet River. In December 1675, a detachment of Massachusetts troops led by General Josiah Winslow stayed at this garrison house on their way to the "Great Swamp Fight" in Kingston, Rhode Island, and they were given provisions.

In January 1676, after the Kingston fight, about 300 Indians attacked Pawtuxet, burning buildings on William Carpenter's land, driving away livestock, and killing two members of his family. The attacks continued, and by March the Indians had burned all the houses in Warwick and Pawtuxet and most of them in Providence, scattering the residents to other localities. William Carpenter and Thomas Hopkins most likely went to Oyster Bay, Long Island, where they had family. It is not known where Stephen Arnold went with his family, but William Arnold was probably not with him. He likely died that winter or spring, aged 88, and was buried in a family plot with his wife and grandson William, son of Benedict. Confirmation of his death did not occur until 3 November 1677 when his son Benedict described himself as "eldest son and heir of William Arnold late of Pautuxett in the said Colony deceased."

== Ancestry ==
The genealogy of the early Arnold family has been pieced together from a number of historical documents, but two such documents were of enough significance to be published as entire articles in an early genealogical journal. The first of these was a family record created by William Arnold and brought to New England by him in 1635. The second of these was a pedigree of Arnold's purported descent from some early kings in Wales dating back to the 12th century. Both of these documents were published side-by-side in the New England Historical and Genealogical Register in October 1879.

=== The Arnold family record ===
While events concerning the immediate families of many colonial immigrants to America were recorded in family Bibles, some of which exist to this day, what William Arnold did was highly unusual among those immigrating to the New World in the 17th century. As the warden of St. Mary's Church in Ilchester, Arnold had access to the records of baptisms, marriages and burials that were kept in the parish register. As he contemplated immigrating with his family to New England, he recorded all the baptismal entries in the Ilchester parish register pertaining to his children and siblings. He then took the process a step further, crossing the River Ivel to the parish of Northover, where his parents had lived and where his oldest sister was baptized, recording pertinent information from that register as well, thus creating a personal family record.

This family document sailed with Arnold from England to the New World in 1635, but the record did not end then. In later years Arnold's son, Benedict, added his own notes and family events to the document, and then Benedict's son Josiah Arnold added his family. The latest entries in the family record were made by the son of Josiah, Josiah Arnold Jr. This exceptional historical document, spanning a total of 223 years and six generations, began with the baptism of William Arnold's mother Alice Gully in 1553 and ended with the death of Josiah Arnold III in 1776.

What became of the document between 1776 and the mid-19th century is uncertain, but it eventually came into the possession of Mr. Patrick Anderson McEwen (a descendant of Governor Benedict Arnold) of Windsor, Ontario, Canada, from whom it passed to Isaac N. Arnold, president of the Chicago Historical Society. A copy was then made by Edwin Hubbard in 1878, and ultimately published under his name the following year. (It turns out that Isaac N. Arnold was descended from Thomas Arnold of Watertown, and thus not from William Arnold of Pawtuxet.) As with any historical document, genealogists and historians wanted to know how reliable it was. Once the original parish registers were discovered by a researcher in 1902, it was demonstrated that every entry in Arnold's original document that could be corroborated with these parish records in England was correct and precise to the minutest detail.

=== The false pedigree of the Arnold family ===
Published in the same issue of the New England Historical and Genealogical Register with the Arnold family record was another article giving a lineage for William Arnold going back 16 generations. In 1870 the genealogist Horatio G. Somerby compiled this pedigree of the Arnold family for a client in New York City based on his research in England. In this pedigree, William Arnold was shown to be a son of a Thomas Arnold and to descend from a 12th-century King of Gwentland (in modern day Wales) whose name was Ynir. Mr. Somerby's manuscript was "compiled from Herald's Visitations, Inquisitions Post Mortem, Subsidy rolls, Wills, Parish registers, and other original documents." A few years after this pedigree was published, John O. Austin incorporated some of it into his Genealogical Dictionary of Rhode Island.

In 1902, Edson S. Jones, a descendant of Thomas Arnold of Watertown and Providence mentioned earlier, visited England in search of records pertaining to his family. Thinking that Thomas Arnold was connected with William Arnold (which, it turned out, he was not), he visited Northover and Ilchester, finding the original parish registers, as well as other important source documents. He discovered that every entry in the Arnold record that could be compared with entries in the parish registers matched perfectly. He also discovered that the Somerby pedigree of the Arnold family had serious discrepancies with original documents. As he checked the source documents from which Somerby supposedly compiled the pedigree, he found that some of the generations in the Somerby pedigree had been shuffled from the original documents, some members of the lineage came from unrelated families, and some place names seemed to have been totally made up. It had earlier been believed that a Thomas Arnold was the father of William Arnold, and Somerby stated that this Thomas Arnold came from a place called Northover near Cheselbourne in County Dorset. No such place called Northover exists. However, it can be found as a street name in several neighbouring villages and occasional farm. It could have been a farm estate founded by the Arnold family, named for their manor in Ilchester, Somerset, or named for the family Northover, of which there were many in Dorset. The Somerby pedigree of the Arnold family published in 1879 was riddled with misinformation, and it had been accepted as fact for over three decades by even prominent genealogists such as John Osborne Austin. Fred Arnold wrote in 1921, "The most regrettable feature in Somerby's work is, that in the absence of any English record, known here to disprove it, so reliable a genealogist as Mr. John O. Austin was led to accept and use it in his dictionary, although neither give any record evidence. Very rarely has Mr. Austin accepted another's statement, unless he has himself seen evidence to support it." This fabricated research was not an isolated incident; Mr. Somerby had also been implicated in other fraudulent research and was out to please his clients regardless of the veracity of his work.^{[e]}

=== The correct ancestry and English home of William Arnold ===
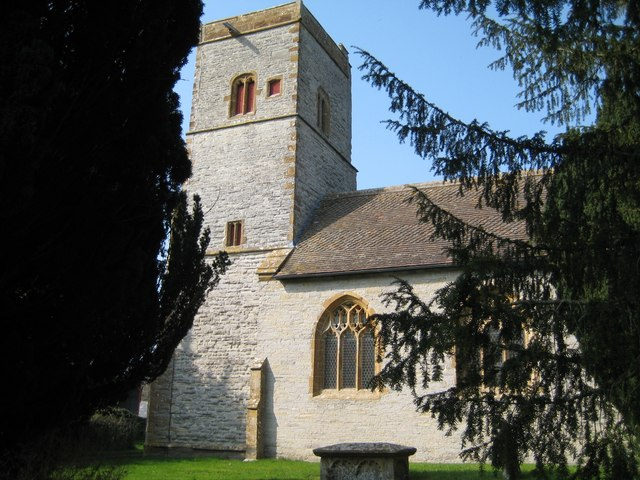
Church of St. Andrew in Northover, England where William Arnold's mother and oldest sister were baptized.

Edson Jones eventually published his findings on the Arnold family in 1915, demonstrating the accuracy of the Arnold family record, and then carefully revealing each inconsistency and factual error found in Somerby's pedigree. In 1921, Fred Arnold summarized these findings and synthesized them into a coherent lineage of the Arnold family which is consistent with every known historical document,^{[f]} and presented his findings to the Rhode Island Historical Society. To summarize the work of both Edson Jones and Fred Arnold, William Arnold was the son of Nicholas Arnold of Northover and Ilchester in Somerset based on the Arnold family record and the Northover parish register. Arnold's mother was Alice Gully, and her parents were John and Alice Gully based on the same two documents. These are the only known ancestors of William Arnold based on known historical records,^{[f]} and the parents of Nicholas Arnold have not been identified in any historical document.^{[g]}

The Somerby pedigree of the Arnold family indicated that the family had lived in many counties in both England and Wales.^{[h]} This was not the case; the Arnolds and their associates all lived in a small area within southeastern Somerset. While in England William Arnold and his family lived in Ilchester. His parents had come from the village of Northover, scarcely one-half mile (0.80 km) across the River Yeo to the north. When Arnold's son Benedict mentioned his "Lemmington" farm in his will, he was referring to a New England property named after the village of Limington in old England; this village is less than a mile and a half (2.5 km) east of Ilchester. A very short distance north of Limington across the River Yeo is the town of Yeovilton where William Hopkins, the husband of Arnold's sister Joanne, lived. Six miles (9.7 km) west of Ilchester is the village of Muchelney, the home of Arnold's wife Christian Peak, and five miles (8.0 km) south of Ilchester is Yeovil, the home of Stukely Westcott, whose daughter Damaris married Arnold's son Benedict, and who may have accompanied the Arnolds on their voyage to the New World. Thus, Arnold and all of his known kinsmen had lived within six miles (9.7 km) of each other in southeastern Somerset.

== Children ==
William and Christian Arnold had four children, all born in Ilchester, Somerset. The oldest child was Elizabeth (1611 – after 7 September 1685) who married William Carpenter (c. 1610–1685), the son of Richard Carpenter of Amesbury, Wiltshire, England; the couple had eight children. William and Elizabeth Carpenter settled in Providence, and then followed her parents to the settlement of Pawtuxet, where they lived the remainder of their lives, except for a short time during King Philip's War, when they were forced to flee to Long Island.

The second child and oldest son was Benedict (1615–1678) who married Damaris Westcott (1621^{[i]} – after 1678), the daughter of Stukeley and Juliann (Marchante) Westcott. They had nine children. Stukely Westcott lived in Yeovil, five miles (eight km) south of Ilchester, where he was married and where Damaris was baptized. The Westcotts may have sailed to New England with the Arnolds; if not they likely sailed at about the same time. Benedict moved with his family from Pawtuxet to Newport in 1651, and in 1657 succeeded Roger Williams as the President of the colony. When the royal charter arrived from England in 1663, Benedict Arnold became the first Governor of the colony, and served as either president or governor for a total of 11 years.

The third child and youngest daughter, Joanna (1617 – after 11 February 1693^{[j]}), married first Zachariah Rhodes (c. 1603–1665), and settled in Pawtuxet near Joanna's brother Stephen. Following Zachariah's death by drowning, Joanna married Samuel Reape. She had eight children, all by her first husband, and became the ancestress of the Rhodes family of Rhode Island.

The fourth and youngest child of William and Christian Arnold was Stephen (1622–1699) who married Sarah Smith (1629–1713), the daughter of Edward Smith of Rehoboth, Massachusetts. Stephen and Sarah had seven children. Stephen was either a Deputy to the General Assembly or colonial Assistant nearly every year for a period of three decades. He and his family settled in Pawtuxet near his father, and had a garrison house along the Pawtuxet River. Stephen was 13 years old when he sailed from England to the New World with his parents and relatives, and he was the last surviving member of that sailing party.

== Notable descendants ==
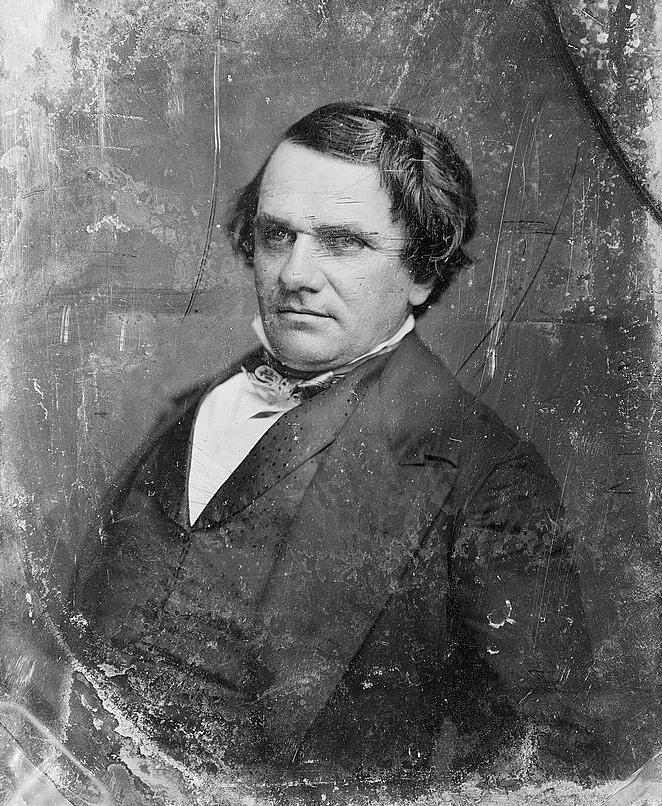
Stephen Arnold Douglas was descended from William Arnold

Several descendants of William Arnold became prominent in the military or civil affairs of the United States. A great-great grandson named Benedict Arnold became notorious for his betrayal of America during the American Revolutionary War. Other descendants include US Presidents George Herbert Walker Bush and George W. Bush; Commodore Oliver Hazard Perry, American hero of the Great Lakes during the War of 1812, and his younger brother Commodore Matthew Calbraith Perry, who was sent across the Pacific Ocean in 1852 by President Millard Fillmore to open Japan to western trade; and Stephen Arnold Douglas, who debated Abraham Lincoln in the Lincoln–Douglas debates of 1858 while vying for an Illinois Senate seat, afterwards losing to Lincoln in the 1860 United States presidential election. A published line of descent from Arnold to U.S. President James A. Garfield was later disproven.

== See also ==
- Colony of Rhode Island and Providence Plantations
- List of early settlers of Rhode Island

== Notes ==
a. The date as written in the original record reads "1622/3." This is because England and her colonies were still using the Julian calendar, and the year began and ended in March. However, clerks and record keepers realized that much of Europe had switched over to the Gregorian calendar (beginning in 1582), with the new year beginning on 1 January, so for the months of January, February and part of March, they wrote the dual year, meaning 1622 in the old calendar and 1623 in the new, even though England would not switch to the Gregorian calendar until the middle of the 18th century.
b. Written 1583/4 in the original records. See note a.
c. Written 1571/2 in the original records. See note a.
d. Another (or possibly the same) Thomas Arnold was of Watertown, in the Massachusetts Bay Colony and later of Providence and has erroneously been labeled as the half-brother of William. William did have a younger half-brother named Thomas, but this half-brother lived and presumably died in England, with no record of his ever having been in New England. The possible parentage of Thomas Arnold of Watertown and Providence was published in 1915 by E. S. Jones, who narrowed down the father of Thomas to two candidates. Fred Arnold, in 1921, was more definitive about Thomas Arnold's parentage, calling him the son of Richard Arnold, goldsmith of London and grandson of William and Katherine Arnold of Kelsale, Suffolk, England.
e. See, for example, Richard Sears (pilgrim), concerning Rev. Edward Hamilton Sears.
f. These original documents include the Arnold family record, the Northover parish register, the bishop's transcript of Ilchester parish records sent to Wells in 1622 (and signed by William Arnold), and the will of Nicholas Arnold.
g. So thorough was Fred Arnold's treatment of the genealogy of William Arnold in 1921, that his work was included verbatim in Elisha S. Arnold's 1935 genealogy of the descendants of William Arnold. Even a modern account of the Arnold family, created from all known published sources and then published under the Great Migration project in 1999 shows no difference in the structure of the family from what was published in 1921, and shows no known ancestry for Nicholas Arnold.
h. Somerby had the family living in Monmouthshire, Gloucester, Wiltshire, and Dorset, as well as a part of Somerset that does not include the Ilchester area. No record has been found to support the claims that the family of William Arnold ever lived in any of these places.
i. Written 1620/1 in the original records. See note a.
j. Written 1692/3 in the original records. See note a.
