= Initial Deed (Providence) =

c. 1638 deed establishing Providence proprietorship

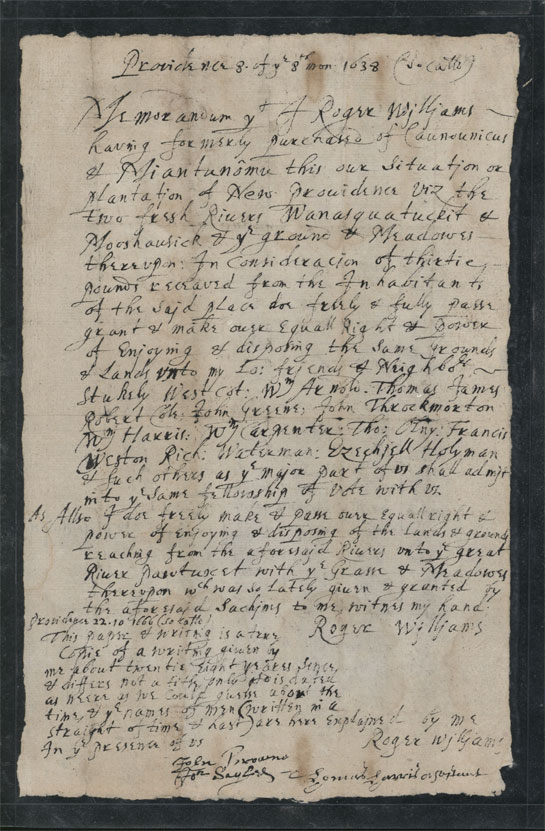
- Roger Williams's restatement of the deed, signed December 22, 1666
- Created: Undated; traditionally October 8, 1638
- Location: Original lost. Copies: Rhode Island Historical Society (certified copy with testimony of 1661, MSS 214, Providence Town Papers no. 0120); Rhode Island State Archives (Williams's signed restatement, 1666)
- Author: Roger Williams
- Signatories: Roger Williams
- Media type: Manuscript
- Subject: Land of Providence and Pawtuxet
- Purpose: Grant of equal rights in the Providence and Pawtuxet lands to Williams's associates

The Initial Deed was a 1638 land conveyance by Roger Williams that granted twelve associates equal rights with himself in the lands he had acquired from the Narragansett sachems Canonicus and Miantonomi. The grant encompassed the settlement of Providence and lands extending south to the Pawtuxet River. The deed's modern name derives from its identification of the grantees only by their initials.

The original document is lost, and its text survives in two later versions. A certified copy, accompanied by sworn testimony of 1661 from three of the grantees, preserves the grantees' initials, while a 1666 restatement by Williams gives their names in full and assigns the deed the date October 8, 1638, which Williams acknowledged was approximate. The deed later became a point of contention between Williams and the proprietor William Harris.

== Background ==
Banished from the Massachusetts Bay Colony, Roger Williams settled in 1636 with a small group of companions near a spring at the mouth of the Moshassuck River, at the head of Narragansett Bay. No record survives of the original grant from the Narragansett sachems, which the nineteenth-century historian William R. Staples believed had been made orally. According to the historian Samuel Hugh Brockunier, Williams shared the land with his companions from the settlement's earliest days, probably under an informal agreement. A town record of June 10, 1638, refers to earlier grants to six men: Throckmorton, Greene, Harris, Verin, Arnold, and Williams. Many of Providence's earliest records were destroyed when the town was burned during King Philip's War.

On March 24, 1637/38, amid pressure from fellow colonists to place the settlement on a firmer legal footing, Williams obtained the sachems' marks on a written deed to himself, commonly known as the "Sachems' Deed" or "Town Evidence". The document recorded two grants. The first confirmed Williams's title to lands on the Moshassuck and Woonasquatucket rivers that, according to the deed, the sachems had "sold" to him about two years earlier. (Note: Williams later wrote that no money changed hands: "not thouhsands nor ten thoughsands of mony could have bought of [Canonicus] an English Entrance into this Bay". Instead, he wrote, he had given the sachems presents and services over many years. Of other Narragansett land, he wrote that what was paid "was only gratuity, though I chose, for better assurance and form, to call it sale".) The second conveyed additional land extending south to the Pawtuxet River, including its meadows, which the sachems stated they granted freely in recognition of Williams's "many kindnesses and services".

About seven months later, in the Initial Deed, Williams put in writing what had until then been an informal arrangement for sharing the Providence lands, and extended it to the newly granted Pawtuxet lands. According to the historian Irving B. Richman, he did so "in response to a demand from Harris". The boundaries of the Pawtuxet lands became the subject of disputes that continued for more than seventy years.

== Initial Deed and the meadow agreement of 1638 ==
=== Initial Deed ===
The original deed has not survived. Knowledge of it derives from a certified copy, sworn testimony given in 1661, and a restatement Williams wrote in 1666. According to Williams's account, the original was undated and named the grantees in abbreviated form, having been "written in a straight of time & hast". It is known as the "Initial Deed" because the grantees were identified only by their initials, such as "S. W." for Stukely Westcott.

The date of the original is unknown. The date usually assigned to it, "8 of the 8th month, 1638", is the one Williams supplied in his 1666 restatement, admitting that it was "dated as neere as we could guesse about the time". (Note: Under the Old Style (Julian) calendar then in use in England and its colonies, the new year began on March 25, so the eighth month was October. Williams avoided the "heathen" names of the months, numbering them instead and often adding "so called", perhaps to acknowledge that the calendar had been replaced by the Gregorian one in Catholic Europe.) The same date appears on the agreement dividing the Pawtuxet meadows among the thirteen proprietors. Brockunier wrote that "on or before October 8" Williams drafted and signed the deed and "turned it over to the settlers together with the Indian deed or 'town evidence'". The historian Howard M. Chapin argued that it must postdate May 21, 1638, when Joshua Verin, one of the earliest settlers, was disfranchised, since Verin does not appear among the grantees.

Both surviving texts give the deed in two clauses. In the first, Williams grants his associates an equal right with himself in the lands on the Woonasquatucket and Moshassuck rivers, "in consideration of thirtie poundes received from the inhabitants", and authorizes them to admit others by majority vote into "the same fellowship of vote". In the second, he grants on the same terms the land extending south to the Pawtuxet River, which the sachems had only recently given him. The £30 was a partial reimbursement of Williams's expenses. By his own account, he had sent presents to the sachems from Plymouth and Salem for years before coming to Narragansett Bay. After settling at Providence he served as their counselor and secretary during the Pequot War (1636–1637), putting his boats and a hired servant at their disposal and ferrying and lodging as many as fifty of them at a time at his house. He had also mortgaged his house and land at Salem to pay for supplies for the settlement. Each person admitted to the fellowship was to pay thirty shillings into a common town fund, from which Williams was to receive the £30; he later said he had been paid £28 of it, "in broken Parcels in 5 yeares".

=== The meadow agreement ===
In a separate agreement, (Note: Brockunier calls it "the Pawtuxet agreement" and Watson "the Meadow Agreement".) also dated October 8, 1638, the thirteen divided the Pawtuxet meadows among themselves on different terms. Whereas the Initial Deed had opened the Pawtuxet lands to all who might later be admitted, this agreement assigned "all the Meddow ground at Patuxett" to "those 13 persons being now Incorporated together in our Towne of providence" alone, each to pay an equal share of £20 to Williams. (Note: Like the deed, the agreement survives only in later copies, certified by the town clerk Thomas Olney Jr. and the general recorders John Sanford and Joseph Torrey. The accompanying copy of Williams's receipt for the payment, dated December 3, 1638, was certified by the town clerk Gregory Dexter on "the 24th of the 5th m: 1650" (July 24, 1650).) The historians Anne Keary and Brockunier both saw the arrangement as at odds with the deed. Keary wrote that the Pawtuxet lands were reserved to the thirteen "apparently against Williams's own wishes", while Brockunier argued that the agreement violated the spirit of the Initial Deed by treating Pawtuxet as the possession of "a closed body of proprietors".

Later settlers objected to the meadow agreement. Williams wrote that he and Chad Brown reconciled these complaining newcomers with "the first monopolizing 12" by arbitration—under the Providence Combination of 1640—which conceded Pawtuxet to the original twelve "only for peace Sake".

=== Grantees ===
The grantees, identified by initials in the certified copy and by name in the 1666 restatement, were:

- Stukely Westcott
- William Arnold
- Thomas James
- Robert Coles
- John Greene
- John Throckmorton
- William Harris
- William Carpenter
- Thomas Olney
- Francis Weston
- Richard Waterman
- Ezekiel Holliman

Together with Williams, they formed the thirteen "first comers". As the genealogist Ian Watson notes, their names are entirely distinct from those of the thirteen men who signed the Providence Civil Compact; he concludes that the grantees were household heads who had each paid for a share of the land, whereas the Compact was signed by younger men and more recent arrivals. Four of the grantees, Richard Waterman, Stukely Westcott, Thomas Olney, and Francis Weston, had been ordered out of Massachusetts in March 1638.

Of Williams's companions of 1636, only Harris appears among the grantees. Verin had returned to Massachusetts, and at least two others, Thomas Angell and Francis Wickes, were minors. (Note: Williams named his 1636 companions as Harris, Smith, Wickes, and "a lad of Rich. Watermans", usually identified as Angell.) The historian Samuel G. Arnold found the absence of the miller John Smith "not easily explained". Chapin suggested that Smith and William Reynolds were excluded "on account of poverty or bad conduct", and that two widows who had headed households, Mary Sweet and Alice Daniell, had probably remarried.

== Copy and testimony of 1661 ==
The earliest surviving text of the Initial Deed is a copy catalogued as no. 0120 in the Providence Town Papers at the Rhode Island Historical Society. It is certified as "A True Copy Extracted Out of the publick Records" by the recorder John Sanford. Like the original, it is undated, names the grantees only by their initials, and is signed "R. W." The copy reads: (Note: Blank square brackets mark gaps where the manuscript is damaged. "J W" corresponds to Francis Weston in the 1666 restatement. "Wanas" and "Wooshe" are shortened forms of the Woonasquatucket and Moshassuck rivers, which the 1666 restatement names in full as "Wanasquatuckett & Mooshausick".)

[ ]morand: That I R W, haveinge formerly purchasse[ ] of Connonicus and Miantinomie this o^{r} Situati. or plantation of New providence Viz; the 2 fresh Rivers Wanas and Wooshe and the ground and Medowes thereupon in Consideration of 30^{lb} Received from the Jnhabittants of the Said place, Doe freely and fully pass grant and make over Equall Right and power of Jnjoying and dispossing the Same grounds and lands, unto my Loveing ffriends and Neighbours: St. W; W. A; [ ] T; J; R C, J T; W H, J G, W C, T O, J W, R Wat, E H, and Such others as the Major part of us shall admitt into the Same fellowship of Vote with us— As alsoe I doe freely make and pass over Equall Right and power of injoying and dispossinge the lands and grounds Reaching from the afore-said Rivers unto the great River pawtuxett w^{t} the grass and Medows thereupon which was alsoe latly give and granted by the 2 afore-said Sachims to mee Witness my hand R. W.

— Providence Town Papers no. 0120

The copy also includes sworn statements by three surviving grantees, made before the town deputy Arthur Fenner. On October 1, 1661, John Throckmorton testified that "Such a writeing as this was delivered to the thirteen [pur]chassers of pawtuxett by m^{r} Roger Williams". On October 2 William Arnold swore that it was "a True Copy of that writeing", and Richard Waterman gave testimony like Throckmorton's. Sanford attested that the three statements were copied from those "Endorsed on the back side" of the deed signed "R W".

== Confirmatory deed of 1661 ==
Confirmatory deed of 1661 signed by Roger and Mary Williams

In December 1661 Williams executed a deed confirming, "in a more formall way", his earlier surrender of his rights in the land to the purchasers. Samuel G. Arnold says it was made at the citizens' request; Brockunier identifies those pressing for it as Harris's party, who demanded that Williams give "an Asurance" or confirmation of the town evidence. On December 6 a town committee appointed to obtain from Williams "a deed of the first purchase" reported, and a second was appointed to obtain Mary Williams's "separate title deed".

The confirmatory deed, dated December 20, 1661, recounts how Williams had obtained the land from the sachems "not by monies nor payment" and shared it with his "loving ffriendes" as "a shelter for persons destressed for Conscience". It names seven of the original grantees in full, together with later admissions such as Chad Brown and Gregory Dexter, but makes no reference to the Initial Deed itself. Instead, Williams wrote that in 1637 he had handed over the Sachems' Deed to the purchasers, keeping a single share for himself, and he declared: "I now againe in a more formall way under my hand and seale confirme my fformer resignation of y^{t} deede". He bound himself and his heirs never to claim any of the land "more than unto my owne single share". Mary Williams added her assent by her mark, releasing her dower right, and the deed was enrolled in the town records on April 6, 1662.

The historian Thomas W. Bicknell argued that until then the informal Initial Deed had left "a lurking suspicion" that Williams might one day "come again into full possession" of the land. Henry C. Dorr notes that the proprietors, considering their title now secure, scarcely mentioned the new deed again. In Brockunier's view, Williams used the confirmatory deed to reassert "the original Providence principle of equality in land and free admission of after comers".

== Restatement of 1666 ==
On December 22, 1666, Williams wrote out the Initial Deed again with the grantees' names in full, dating it "8 of y^{e}: 8^{th} mon: 1638" (October 8, 1638) and adding a statement that it was a true copy of the original. It was enrolled in the town's third book of records, the "Book with Brass Clasps". The enrolled text reads:

Providence 8 of y^{e}: 8^{th} mon: 1638 (so called)

Memorandum y^{t} I Roger Williams haveing formerly purchassed of Caunounicus, & Miantenomue this our scituation, or plantation of New providence, viz the Two ffresh Rivers Wanasquatuckett & Mooshausick, and y^{e} ground & Meadowes thereupon; Jn Consideration of Thirtie poundes received from the Jnhabetantes of the saide place, doe freely, & ffully passe grant & make over Equall Right and power of Enjoyeing & dispossing the same groundes & Landes unto my Lo: ffriends & neighbo^{rs} Stukley Westcoot; W^{m} Arnold; Thomas James; Robert Cole: John Greene; John Throckmorton; W^{m} Harris: W^{m} Carpenter: Tho: Olney, ffrancis Weston, Rich: Waterman: Ezechiell Holliman: and such others as the Major part of us shall admitt into the same ffelloshipp of Voate with us, As also I doe ffreely make & passe over equall Right and power of Enjoyeing and despossing of the Lands & grounds Reaching from the aforsaid Rivers unto the great River pautuxett with the grasse and meadowes there upon w^{ch} was so lately given & granted by the aforsaid Sachims to me wittnesse my hand:
Providence 22: 10, 1666 (so called) Roger Williams
This paper & writing is a true Coppie of a wrighteing given by me about Twenty Eight yeares since, & differs not a tittle only so is dated as neere as wee Could guesse about the time and the names of men (written in a straight of time & hast) are here Explained by me
in the presence of us Roger Williams
John Browne
Jo^{n} Sayles

Thomas Harris Assisstant

— Early Records of the Town of Providence 3:90–91 (Note: Some printings read "differs not a little". The town record, the colonial records, Chapin, and Edmund J. Carpenter all give "tittle".)

Historians have explained the restatement in different ways. Samuel G. Arnold took its "sole object" to be "to explain the first one as to date and names". William B. Weeden wrote that the Initial Deed was "reinforced by documents in 1661 and 1666 intended to amplify and secure" the proprietors' title. Glenn W. LaFantasie, the editor of Williams's correspondence, places it in the renewed feud with Harris: Williams "reasserted his opposition to Harris's Pawtuxet designs by preparing a new version of the so-called Initial Deed that reiterated the original boundaries of Providence". The town split into rival town meetings the following year. James N. Arnold, a descendant of William Arnold, wrote that discontent among the settlers "so alarmed Mr. Williams that he at last yielded and did what he should have done nearly thirty years before".

The town clerk, Thomas Olney Jr., noted on Williams's signed original that it was entered in the town records on December 25, 1666, in the "Booke with Brase Claspes". In 1966 the historian Sydney V. James found a manuscript of the restatement in Williams's hand in the vault of the Superior Court at Newport, in a pile of legal papers from an eighteenth-century land dispute. James said the find did not "change anything or tell us anything about Providence"; its interest lay in its being "the original document". Williams's signed manuscript is held by the Rhode Island State Archives. It was restored in 1984 with funding from the Bristol County Chapter of the Daughters of the American Revolution and afterward displayed in the Rhode Island State House. (Note: The State Archives catalogs the manuscript as "Memorandum of original deed for Providence, December 10, 1666". The document itself is dated "22: 10, 1666", the 22nd day of the 10th month (December).)

== Dispute with Harris, 1677–1681 ==
The Initial Deed became evidence in the long dispute between Williams and William Harris over the Pawtuxet lands. Acting for the Pawtuxet proprietors, Harris obtained a royal order of August 4, 1675, directing the governors of the New England colonies to have his claims heard by a special court of commissioners. After King Philip's War the court met at Providence in October 1677, with a bench and jury under Thomas Hinckley of Plymouth. In his declaration against the town, Harris charged Williams with "taking the lands of Providence in his owne name" when they should have been taken in the names of those who came with him, and with having sold them "for more then it Cost him". On Pawtuxet he charged that Williams had promised it for £5 but taken £20. He also dismissed Williams's explanation of the initials as "a mere pretence of haste", and said that Williams had promised the proprietors a more formal deed but refused to sign one when it was drawn up.

Williams answered the charges on or before November 17, the day of the trial. He denied that he had been "such a foole" as to sell either Providence or Pawtuxet. He had agreed, he wrote, that Providence "should be for such as were destitute (especially for Conscience)", in return for contributions toward his expenses, and had later "parted with" Pawtuxet "upon the same tearms". He added that the first twelve had acknowledged themselves to be no more than "Feoffees", that is, trustees holding the land for the town, since the newcomers' payments went not to them but "for a Towne stock". (Note: Williams called the Harris party's claim that the Sachems' Deed extended "upstreams without Lymmit" a "monstrous boundles busines" that "was not thought of" in 1638.)

The court returned verdicts in Harris's favor on November 19–21, 1677. A postscript to the Sachems' Deed allowed the settlers' cattle to graze "up streams without limits". Williams held that this was "a mere courtesy and license" to use the land, not a grant of it, but the court rejected his view. The verdict required the Providence–Pawtuxet line to be extended westward to a cross line drawn from "the head of the Wanasquatucket" to the Pawtuxet, but did not say where the head of that river lay. Williams and Arthur Fenner, acting for Providence, ran the cross line from a junction of streams well below the river's source, cutting off most of the land Harris claimed. When the jury explained in 1678 that it had meant the river's source, the court divided over the question and referred the matter to the king. Harris sailed for England late in 1679 to obtain a royal order enforcing the verdicts, but his ship was captured by a Barbary corsair. He was held at Algiers until he was ransomed in 1681, and died within three days of reaching London. After his death the remaining proprietors pursued the claim without success, and eventually agreed with Providence on a boundary that "virtually ended" the controversy.

== Interpretations ==
=== Legal validity ===
Bicknell, whose history set out to overturn the traditional account of Williams's role in founding Rhode Island, argued that the deed "is not a legal document as it is not dated, is not legally signed or witnessed and has no legal grantees and no beneficiary". Dorr had earlier taken the opposite view, arguing that such formalities were not in general use in Providence until a generation later, and that the proprietors' long possession had in any case made their title secure.

=== Sale or trust ===
Historians have divided over the question Harris raised: whether Williams sold the land to the proprietors or placed it in their hands for the benefit of the town. Dorr concluded that the deed "created no express trust", and Bicknell described the proprietorship as "a close corporation of land holders in perpetual succession". James Ernst, by contrast, described the grantees as sharing equally with Williams "as trustees of a land corporation", and Keary wrote of "the unsettled land held in trust".

=== Significance ===
Writers sympathetic to Williams saw the deed as an act of generosity. Ernst wrote that "at one fell swoop he rid himself of his land monopoly and his autocratic powers". Bicknell took the opposite view, calling the proprietorship it created "a pure autocracy and not a pure democracy". Brockunier rejected both readings: Williams, he wrote, "was certainly no communist, nor was he a feudal overlord", and he "did not contemplate a body of proprietors separate from the body of voters". Keary places the deed among the written instruments through which the settlers brought their agreements with the Narragansetts, and with one another, within the framework of English law.

== See also ==
- Providence Civil Compact
- Providence Combination of 1640
- List of early settlers of Rhode Island

== Sources ==
- Arnold, James N. (1901). The Life and Times of Benedict Arnold, First Governor of Rhode Island Under the Charter. Newport, R.I.: Mercury Publishing Company.
- Arnold, Samuel Greene (1859). History of the State of Rhode Island and Providence Plantations. Vol. 1. New York: D. Appleton & Company.
- Bartlett, John Russell, ed. (1856). Records of the Colony of Rhode Island and Providence Plantations, in New England. Vol. 1: 1636 to 1663. Providence: A. Crawford Greene and Brother, State Printers.
- Bicknell, Thomas Williams (1920). The History of the State of Rhode Island and Providence Plantations. Vol. 1. New York: American Historical Society.
- Brockunier, Samuel Hugh (1940). The Irrepressible Democrat: Roger Williams. Ronald Series in History. New York: Ronald Press.
- Carpenter, Edmund J. (1909). Roger Williams: A Study of the Life, Times and Character of a Political Pioneer. New York: Grafton Press.
- Chapin, Howard M. (1916). Documentary History of Rhode Island. Vol. 1. Providence: Preston and Rounds.
- Dorr, Henry C. (1897). The Proprietors of Providence, and Their Controversies with the Freeholders. Collections of the Rhode Island Historical Society. Vol. 9. Providence: Rhode Island Historical Society.
- Rogers, Horatio; Carpenter, George Moulton; Field, Edward, eds. (1893). The Early Records of the Town of Providence. Vol. 3: Being Part of the Third Book of the Town of Providence Otherwise Called the Book with Brass Clasps. Record Commissioners. Providence: Snow & Farnham.
- Rogers, Horatio; Carpenter, George Moulton; Field, Edward, eds. (1894). The Early Records of the Town of Providence. Vol. 5: Being Part of the Third Book of the Town of Providence Otherwise Called the Book with Brass Clasps. Record Commissioners. Providence: Snow & Farnham.
- Rogers, Horatio; Field, Edward, eds. (1899). The Early Records of the Town of Providence. Vol. 15: Being the Providence Town Papers, Vol. 1, 1639–April 1682, Nos. 01–0367. Record Commissioners. Providence: Snow & Farnham.
- Ernst, James (1932). Roger Williams: New England Firebrand. New York: Macmillan.
- Jones, Brian C. (August 7, 1966). "Roger Williams Deed Found in Newport". The Providence Journal. pp. 1–2 – via NewsBank.
- Keary, Anne (1996). "Retelling the History of the Settlement of Providence: Speech, Writing, and Cultural Interaction on Narragansett Bay". The New England Quarterly. 69 (2): 250–286. doi:10.2307/366667. JSTOR 366667.
- LaFantasie, Glenn W., ed. (1988). The Correspondence of Roger Williams. Vol. 1: 1629–1653. Hanover, N.H.: Brown University Press / University Press of New England for the Rhode Island Historical Society.
- LaFantasie, Glenn W., ed. (1988). The Correspondence of Roger Williams. Vol. 2: 1654–1682. Hanover, N.H.: Brown University Press / University Press of New England for the Rhode Island Historical Society.
- Paine, George T. (1896). A Denial of the Charges of Forgery in Connection with the Sachems' Deed to Roger Williams. Providence: Standard Printing Company.
- Rhode Island Historical Society (February 1998). "Providence Town Papers, 1639–1832 (MSS 214, sg1)" (Finding aid). Processed by Robin Flynn. Rhode Island Historical Society, Manuscripts Division.
- Rhode Island State Archives. "Memorandum of original deed for Providence, December 10, 1666". Rhode Island State Archives catalog. Rhode Island Department of State.
- Richman, Irving B. (1902). "The Land Controversies of William Harris". Harris Papers. Collections of the Rhode Island Historical Society. Vol. 10. Calendar and notes by Clarence S. Brigham. Providence: Rhode Island Historical Society. pp. 11–22.
- Watson, Ian (2020). "The Dating of the Providence Civil Compact" (PDF). The American Genealogist. 92: 165–189, 261–283.
- Weeden, William B. (1910). Early Rhode Island: A Social History of the People. New York: Grafton Press.
