= John Warner (settler) =

English-born settler in Rhode Island

- Born: c. 1615; England
- Died: after 1652
- Occupations: Settler, town clerk, colonial official
- Known for: Providence Combination of 1640; Shawomet controversy; early governance of Warwick, Rhode Island
- Spouse: Priscilla Holliman (m. 1637)
- Children: John, Susanna, Mary, Rachel

Signature
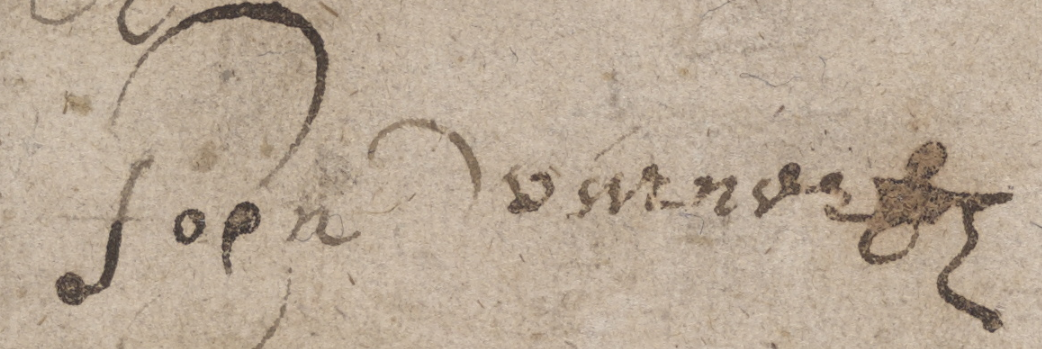

John Warner (c. 1615 – after 1652) was an English-born settler and colonial official in the Colony of Rhode Island and Providence Plantations. He was among the co-authors of the Providence Combination of 1640, an early civil compact establishing representative government and religious liberty in Providence, and later served as the first town clerk of Warwick.

Warner became a prominent figure in the Shawomet land dispute of the early 1640s. After participating in the 1642/43 purchase of Shawomet alongside Samuel Gorton and others, he was arrested by authorities of the Massachusetts Bay Colony, tried in Boston on charges of heresy and sedition, and imprisoned for several months. He was subsequently appointed a commissioner representing Narragansett leaders in their 1644 submission to the English Crown.

In Warwick, Warner held several civic offices, including town clerk and clerk of the Rhode Island General Assembly. His later career ended in political conflict: in 1652 he was removed from office, disenfranchised, and effectively exiled following a series of disputes with town authorities. He left Rhode Island later that year, sailing for England with members of his family.

== Early life ==
John Warner was the son of Timothy Warner of St. Albans, Hertfordshire. Parish records show that he married Priscilla Holliman, daughter of Ezekiel Holliman of Tring, Hertfordshire, at St. Albans Abbey on 6 June 1637. Priscilla was baptized at Wigginton, Hertfordshire on 18 June 1618. Their son John was baptized at St. Albans Abbey on 6 January 1638/9. (Note: Earlier writers, following the prominent nineteenth-century historian James Savage, identified Warner as the passenger named John Warner who sailed from London to Massachusetts Bay aboard the ship Increase in 1635. Ian Watson's reconstruction of the Hertfordshire parish records demonstrates that this passenger was a different man, as Warner was still living in Hertfordshire at his marriage in 1637 and at the baptism of his son in 1638/9.)

== Providence settler ==
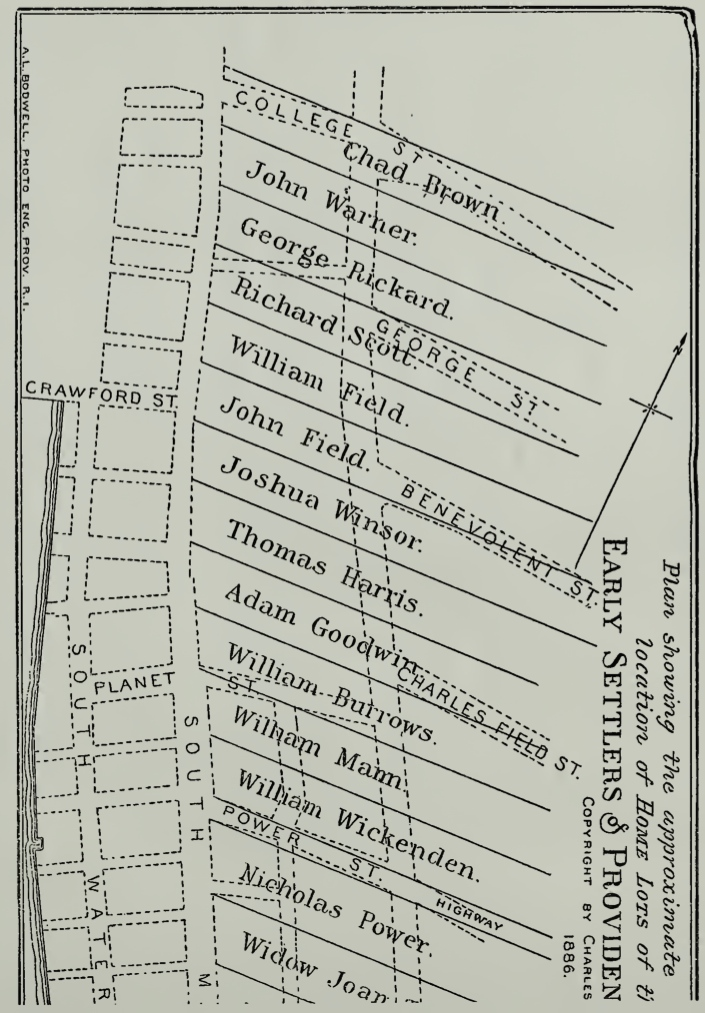
Location of Warner's home lot in Providence

John Warner was among a second wave of settlers in Providence, Rhode Island, who joined the community after its initial founding. The original proprietors—the thirteen founding heads of households—signed the Initial Deed on 8 October 1638. Warner and other later arrivals signed the Providence Civil Compact beginning in March 1639/40.

Warner was granted a home lot on Towne Street in 1639 and had constructed a house there by 1640.

In July 1640, he was one of the four co-authors of the Providence Combination of 1640, alongside Robert Coles, Chad Brown, and William Harris. The agreement established a secular, representative form of government for the settlement and affirmed liberty of conscience.

== Shawomet (Warwick) land dispute ==
On 12 January 1642/43, he joined Samuel Gorton, Randall Holden, John Greene, and others in purchasing Shawomet (later Warwick, Rhode Island) from the Narragansett sachem Miantonomoh.

The transaction was disputed by settlers at Pawtuxet, who appealed to the Massachusetts Bay Colony for intervention. Colonial authorities responded by dispatching troops to Shawomet, arresting Warner and the other purchasers, and transporting them to Boston for trial. There, the defendants were charged with heresy and sedition rather than any offense related to land acquisition. Warner was sentenced to imprisonment “in irons” and remained confined throughout the winter of 1643–44.

In April 1644, following Miantonomoh’s killing by the Mohegan sachem Uncas with Massachusetts approval, the Narragansett leaders Canonicus and Pessicus—fearing further conflict—placed themselves and their lands under the protection of the English Crown. They appointed Gorton, Holden, Wickes, and Warner as commissioners to carry their Act of Submission to England. Later that year, Gorton, Holden, and Greene traveled to England with both the submission and a memorial protesting colonial actions against the Shawomet settlers. Parliamentary protection was subsequently granted, and in gratitude to their patron, Robert Rich, 2nd Earl of Warwick, the settlement took the name Warwick.

== Public service ==
Warner established himself in the Warwick community. In 1644 he was appointed one of four commissioners to convey the Narragansett sachems’ Act of Submission to the English government—a declaration placing the Narragansett tribe under the protection of the English Crown. When Warwick organized a formal government in 1647 under the 1644 Parliamentary Patent brought from England by Roger Williams, Warner was chosen as the town’s first clerk and a member of the first town council.

Town meetings during this period were often held in private homes, and by 1652 the regular place of assembly for Warwick’s town business was the house of John Warner, reflecting his central role in the town’s early civic administration.

He also served as clerk of the Rhode Island General Assembly in 1648.

== 1652 charges and banishment ==
In 1652, a dispute with the crew of a Dutch trading vessel escalated into a major confrontation. Warner, who was then serving as Assistant (the second magistrate of Warwick), had boarded the Dutch traders in his home for several months, including Geraerd, his brother‑in‑law through their marriages into the Holliman family. When a disagreement over accounts reached the town court, Warner refused to appear at a special session, and judgment was entered against him by default. Warner’s wife was also indicted “upon suspicion of felony,” and the case was carried to the General Court of Trials.

At a town meeting on 24 April 1652, Warner was removed from office and disenfranchised on a series of charges recorded in Warwick town records:

“for calling the officers of the Towne rogues and theeves… for calling the whole Towne rogues & theeves… for threatninge the lives of men… for threatninge to kill all the mares in Towne… for threatninge an officer of the Collonie… that if hee had him otherwhere he would beate out his braynes…”

Warner appealed his banishment, but the petition was denied. On 22 June, the town ordered Warner’s house and land attached “upon suspicion of unsufferable treacherie against the town,” prohibiting any sale until he answered the charges at the next Court of Trials. His property was restored on 5 July, though several leading townsmen protested the decision. The proceedings were later forwarded to Roger Williams in England.

== Departure and death ==
On 17 July 1652, Warner conveyed his Warwick property to trustees for the support of his youngest daughter, Rachel, and prepared to leave the colony. He sailed for England later that year with his wife and three of their children—John, Susanna, and Mary—while their infant daughter Rachel remained in Rhode Island.

According to nineteenth‑century family tradition, Warner was lost at sea before March 1654. More recent research suggests that Warner and his wife remained and died in England. Priscilla Warner witnessed a marriage at St. Albans in 1658 and a John Warner was buried at St. Michael’s, St. Albans, on 16 March 1661/2.

Their daughter Rachel, who remained in Rhode Island, married Abel Potter in 1669. Their son John returned from England in 1658 at the request of his grandfather Ezekiel Holliman to inherit the Holliman estate in Providence.

== See also ==
- Providence Combination of 1640
- Samuel Gorton
- History of Warwick, Rhode Island

== Bibliography ==
- "Apponaug: The 19th Century Municipal Center". Warwick Digital History Project. Warwick Historical Society.
- Arnold, Samuel Greene (1859). History of the State of Rhode Island and Providence Plantations. Vol. 1. New York: D. Appleton & Company.
- Austin, John Osborne (1887). The Genealogical Dictionary of Rhode Island. Albany: J. Munsell’s Sons.
- Avalon Project (1909). "Plantation Agreement at Providence, August 27 – September 6, 1640". The Avalon Project. Yale Law School.
- Bartlett, John Russell (1856). Records of the Colony of Rhode Island and Providence Plantations in New England, Vol. I: 1636–1663. Providence, R.I.: A. Crawford Greene and Brother, State Printers.
- Collections of the Rhode‑Island Historical Society, Vol. V. Providence: Knowles and Vose, Printers. 1843.
- Fuller, Oliver Payson (1875). The History of Warwick, Rhode Island: From Its Settlement in 1642 to the Present Time. Providence: Angell, Burlingame & Co.
- Gorton, Adelos (1907). The Life and Times of Samuel Gorton (PDF). Philadelphia: George H. Whitney.
- Providence Record Commissioners (1892). The Early Records of the Town of Providence. Vol. 1. Snow & Farnham Co. OCLC 58736426.
- Savage, James (1862). A Genealogical Dictionary of the First Settlers of New England. Vol. 4. Boston: Little, Brown and Company.
- Watson, Ian (2020). "The Dating of the Providence Civil Compact" (PDF). The American Genealogist. 91: 267–273.
