= Providence Civil Compact =

First civil compact for Providence

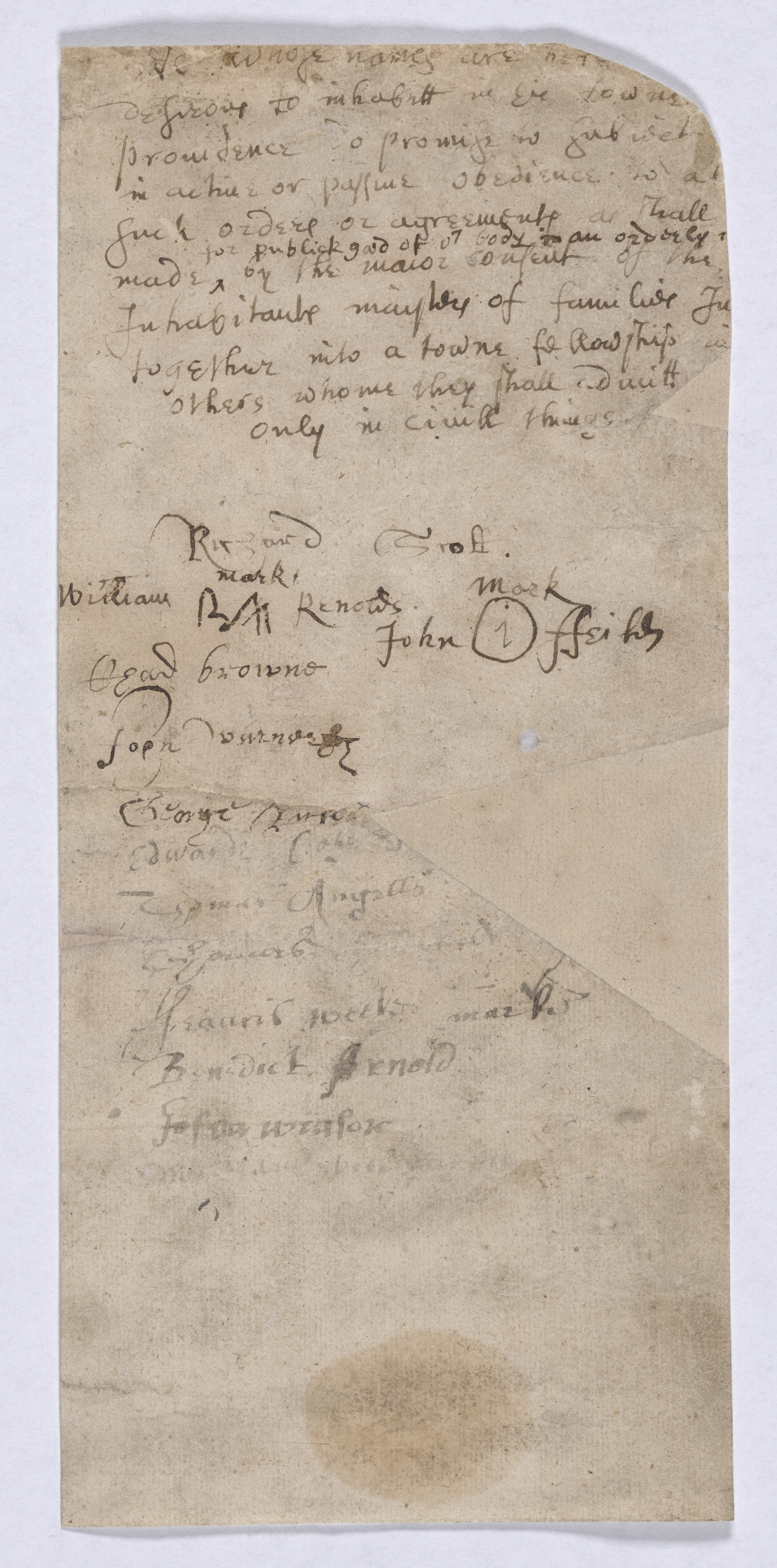
- Providence Civil Compact
- Created: 1637
- Ratified: c. 1638-1640
- Superseded: August 6 [O.S. July 27], 1640
- Location: Providence City Hall
- Authors: Roger Williams (author); Thomas James (scribe)
- Signatories: 13 inhabitants of Providence
- Purpose: To limit governmental authority to "civil things" only
- Superseded by: Providence Combination of 1640

The Providence Civil Compact (sometimes referred to as the Scott Petition) was a foundational agreement signed by thirteen settlers of the Towne of Providence (now Providence, Rhode Island), in which they pledged obedience to the decisions of local government—but only in "civil things." This early assertion of limited government authority is one of the first known declarations in colonial America to endorse the principle of separation of church and state, and it laid the groundwork for religious liberty in Rhode Island.

== Background and signatories ==
Roger Williams, a Puritan minister and theologian, was banished from the Massachusetts Bay Colony in 1636 for his "new and dangerous opinions," including the belief that civil magistrates had no authority over matters of conscience or religious practice. He objected to the colony's enforcement of religious uniformity, compulsory worship, and oaths of allegiance, and he defended the land rights of Indigenous peoples.

Williams fled to Narragansett territory and founded a settlement he called Providence (sometimes "New Providence" in the very early days). On March 24 [O.S. March 14], 1638, he obtained a deed from the Narragansett sachems Canonicus and Miantonomi, confirming legal title to the land. Later that year, he distributed the land among twelve settlers in what became known as the "Initial Deed." The thirteen original proprietors were: Stukely Westcott, William Arnold, Thomas James, Robert Coles, John Greene, John Throckmorton, William Harris, William Carpenter, Thomas Olney, Francis Weston, Richard Waterman, Ezekiel Holyman, and Roger Williams as the grantor.

This group of proprietors was entirely distinct from the thirteen signers of the Providence Civil Compact, with no overlap between the two groups. While the proprietors represented the established heads of households who held founding shares in the settlement, the compact signers were newcomers and younger men seeking admission to the community. The compact signers included Richard Scott, William Reynolds, John Field, Chad Browne, John Warner, George Richard, Edward Cope, Thomas Angell, Thomas Harris, Francis Wickes, Benedict Arnold, Joshua Winsor, and William Wickenden. Notable family relationships existed between the groups—William Arnold was a proprietor while his son Benedict Arnold signed the compact, and William Harris was a proprietor while his brother Thomas Harris signed the compact—but no individual appeared on both lists, reflecting the complementary nature of the two groups in Providence's early governance structure.

== Creation and dating ==
The exact date of the Providence Civil Compact is unknown, as the manuscript itself bears no date. The traditional attribution of "August the 20th, 1637" arose from a later town record notation and does not reflect when the document was actually authored or signed.

Historian Ian Watson argues for a revised chronology: the text was first drafted by Roger Williams in spring 1637, not the traditionally assumed August–September 1636. Watson challenges the earlier dating, which was based on references to Pequot War preparations in Williams' correspondence with Massachusetts Bay Deputy Governor John Winthrop. Instead, Watson contends the letter describing the draft was more likely sent in spring 1637, as it describes a more established settlement with greater need for formal governance than would have existed just weeks after Providence's founding in 1636.

The physical document (the final draft) was transcribed by Thomas James, a Cambridge-educated minister who served as Providence's town clerk, as conclusively demonstrated through handwriting analysis in 1963. Watson proposes that the first group of the thirteen signatures was likely affixed in 1638—a full year after the traditional date—with additional names added through mid-1640 as new settlers arrived and sought admission to the community.

Richard Scott, a Baptist who later became a Quaker and was married to Katherine Marbury Scott, sister of Anne Hutchinson, was likely the first person to sign the document. The document was sometimes nicknamed the "Scott Petition" in the early 20th century based on erroneous claims that Scott authored it.

== Manuscript ==
The original manuscript belongs to the city of Providence. Since February 2020 it has been displayed at Providence City Hall, outside the City Council chambers, together with the 1638 deed from the Narragansett sachems and the town charter of 1648, with transcriptions in English and Spanish.

== Content and significance ==
The text of the compact reads:

"We whose names are hereunder desirous to inhabitt in ye towne of providence do promise to subject ourselves in active or passive obedience to all such orders or agreements as shall be made for publick good of or body in an orderly way by the maior consent of the present inhabitants maisters of families incorporated together into a towne fellowship and others whome they shall admitt unto them only in civill things."

The clause "only in civil things" was written on a separate line in the original manuscript, indicating its special emphasis. This limitation marked a radical departure from the prevailing colonial norms, which typically tied civil authority to religious orthodoxy.

In contrast to the Mayflower Compact (1620), which invoked God and religious purpose, the Providence Compact made no mention of religion and refrained from requiring oaths. Its emphasis on secular governance anticipated the principles later enshrined in the First Amendment to the United States Constitution.

== Legacy ==
The principle of limiting governmental authority to "civil things" became foundational in Rhode Island's legal and cultural identity. This compact set the precedent for the Providence Combination of 1640, in which nearly forty residents formalized town governance while affirming the right to "Liberty of Conscience."

Neighboring colonies viewed the Providence experiment with suspicion. Religion scholar Theodore Dwight Bozeman wrote that the colony was seen as "a banished colony, the outcast of New England" due to its religious heterodoxy and perceived lack of civil order. Nonetheless, the compact's principles influenced later developments in religious freedom and constitutional government. Historian Edwin S. Gaustad called it "revolutionary in that it explicitly limited the power of government to civil matters only." Historian Sydney V. James described it as "the first instance in America of a political covenant that limited civil authority by explicitly excluding from its reach matters of religious conscience."

== See also ==
- Providence Plantations
- Separation of church and state
- Roger Williams (theologian)
- Religious freedom in the United States

== Bibliography ==
- Barry, John M. (2012). Roger Williams and the Creation of the American Soul: Church, State, and the Birth of Liberty. New York: Viking. ISBN 978-0-670-02305-9. OCLC 733230664.
- Bozeman, Theodore Dwight (1972). "Religious Liberty and the Problem of Order in Early Rhode Island". The New England Quarterly. 45 (1): 44–64. doi:10.2307/364222. JSTOR 364222.
- Dreisbach, Daniel (2020). "The Puritanical Roger Williams". Law & Liberty.
- Each Life Has Its Place (16 March 2020). "Roger Williams 1638 land deed".
- Gaustad, Edwin S. (1999). Liberty of Conscience: Roger Williams in America. Valley Forge, Pa.: Judson Press. ISBN 978-0-8170-1338-7. OCLC 40713821.
- Glickman, Ben (February 26, 2020). "Providence Founding Documents Return to City Hall". The Brown Daily Herald.
- James, Sydney V. (1975). Colonial Rhode Island: A History. New York: Scribner. ISBN 978-0-684-14359-0. OCLC 1273610.
- Lutz, Donald S., ed. (1998). Colonial Origins of the American Constitution: A Documentary History. Indianapolis: Liberty Fund. ISBN 978-0-86597-157-8. OCLC 231736900.
- Morgan, Edmund S. (1967). Roger Williams: The Church and the State. New York: Harcourt, Brace & World. OCLC 391454.
- Providence Record Commissioners (1892). The Early Records of the Town of Providence. Vol. 1. Snow & Farnham Co. OCLC 58736426.
- Providence (R.I.); Providence City Council (1895). Index to the Providence Town Papers. Record Commissioners. OCLC 462118818.
- Rhode Island State Archives. "Providence Town Papers".
- Rhode Island State Archives (1666). "Memorandum of original deed for Providence, December 10, 1666". Archived from the original on 29 September 2007.
- Rider, Sidney S. (1905). "Annihilation of the Claim for Richard Scott to Be the Author of the First Compact of Government for Providence". Book Notes, Historical, Literary, and Critical. 22: 105–111.
- Staples, William R. (1843). Annals of the Town of Providence, from its First Settlement, to the Organization of the City Government, in June, 1832. Providence: Knowles and Vose. OCLC 1399279626.
- Swan, Bradford F. (1963). The Rev. Thomas James, the Civil Compact, and the Town Evidence. Society of Colonial Wars, Rhode Island. Publications. Vol. 48. Providence: Roger Williams Press. OCLC 3422971.
- Watson, Ian (2020). "The Dating of the Providence Civil Compact" (PDF). The American Genealogist. 96: 165–173, 278–282.
