= Thomas James (minister, born 1595) =

English Puritan minister in New England (1595–1683)

- Born: Boston, Lincolnshire, England
- Baptized: 5 October 1595
- Died: February 1682/3; Needham Market, Suffolk, England
- Education: University of Cambridge (BA, 1615; MA, 1618)
- Occupation: Minister
- Known for: Founding pastor of Charlestown; Providence Civil Compact; Peach murder trial
- Spouse(s): Olive Ingoldsby (m. 1620; d. 1630); Elizabeth (m. by 1632)
- Children: 6, incl. Rev. Thomas James

Signature
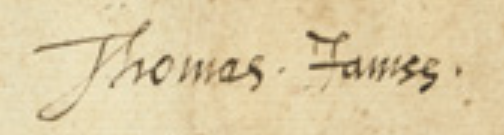

Thomas James (baptised 5 October 1595 – February 1682/3) was an English Puritan minister who emigrated to New England during the Great Migration. He was the founding pastor of the First Church in Charlestown in 1632 and a founding settler of Providence, Rhode Island. He testified at the Peach murder trial in 1638, was a teacher in New Haven Colony, and was a Puritan missionary to Virginia. After returning permanently to England, he became minister at Needham Market, Suffolk, until his ejection under the Act of Uniformity 1662.

== Early life ==
James was baptized on 5 October 1595 in Boston, Lincolnshire, the son of the Reverend John James of Skirbeck, Lincolnshire, and his wife Alice. James entered Emmanuel College, Cambridge, in 1611 at the age of fifteen. He received a B.A. in 1615 and an M.A. in 1618. He was ordained a deacon at Peterborough Cathedral on 16 March 1616/7 and a priest the following day.

== Marriage and children ==
James married his first wife, Olive Ingoldsby, at Fishtoft, Lincolnshire, on 20 April 1620. Four children were baptized to them at Moulton, Lincolnshire: John (1622/3–1630), Peter (1625/6–1625/6), Dorcas (1626–1630), and Thomas (1626–1698), who later became minister of East Hampton, Long Island. Of the four children, only Thomas survived to adulthood. Olive was buried at Moulton on 7 October 1630.

James married his second wife, Elizabeth, a niece of the Reverend Peter Bulkeley, by 1632. No children of this marriage are recorded in contemporary sources.

== Boston (1632–1636) ==
James and his second wife emigrated in 1632 aboard the William and Francis. They were admitted to the First Church in Boston on 1 March 1632/33. On 14 October 1632 the couple, together with thirty‑five other members, were formally dismissed from the Boston church in order to organize a new congregation at Charlestown, a location more convenient for their attendance. The ferry between Boston and Charlestown was often unreliable in winter, making regular attendance difficult. Massachusetts Bay Colony Governor John Winthrop explained that the dismissal was granted "in regard of the difficulty of passage in the winter, and having opportunity of a pastor, one Mr. James, who came over at this time." On 6 November 1632 James took the freeman's oath, becoming a voting member of the Massachusetts Bay Colony.

Following a day of fasting and prayer, the Charlestown church was organized on 2 November 1632. Sixteen married men, their wives, and three single men signed the church covenant. James was elected and ordained pastor, while Ralph Mousall and Thomas Hale were chosen as the first deacons.

James's pastorate soon became marked by controversy. Winthrop noted in 1634 that some questioned the Charlestown church's separation from Boston. After the arrival of fellow Emmanuel College graduate Zechariah Symmes in 1634, tensions increased. According to a later account written by Symmes himself, "the teacher, Mr. Symmes, and most of the brethren had taken offence at divers speeches of his [James's], he being a melancholy man, and full of causeless jealousies."

A council of ministers met in March 1635/6 to consider the continuing disputes. They judged that James had been "to blame, for speaking out as of certainty that which he had only conjectured," but also that others were not entirely without fault. The council advised that "if the breach cannot be healed, the pastor and such as sided with him should ask a dismission." James's dismissal, dated 11 March 1635/6, marked his formal release from the Charlestown pastorate.

== Providence (1637–1639) ==
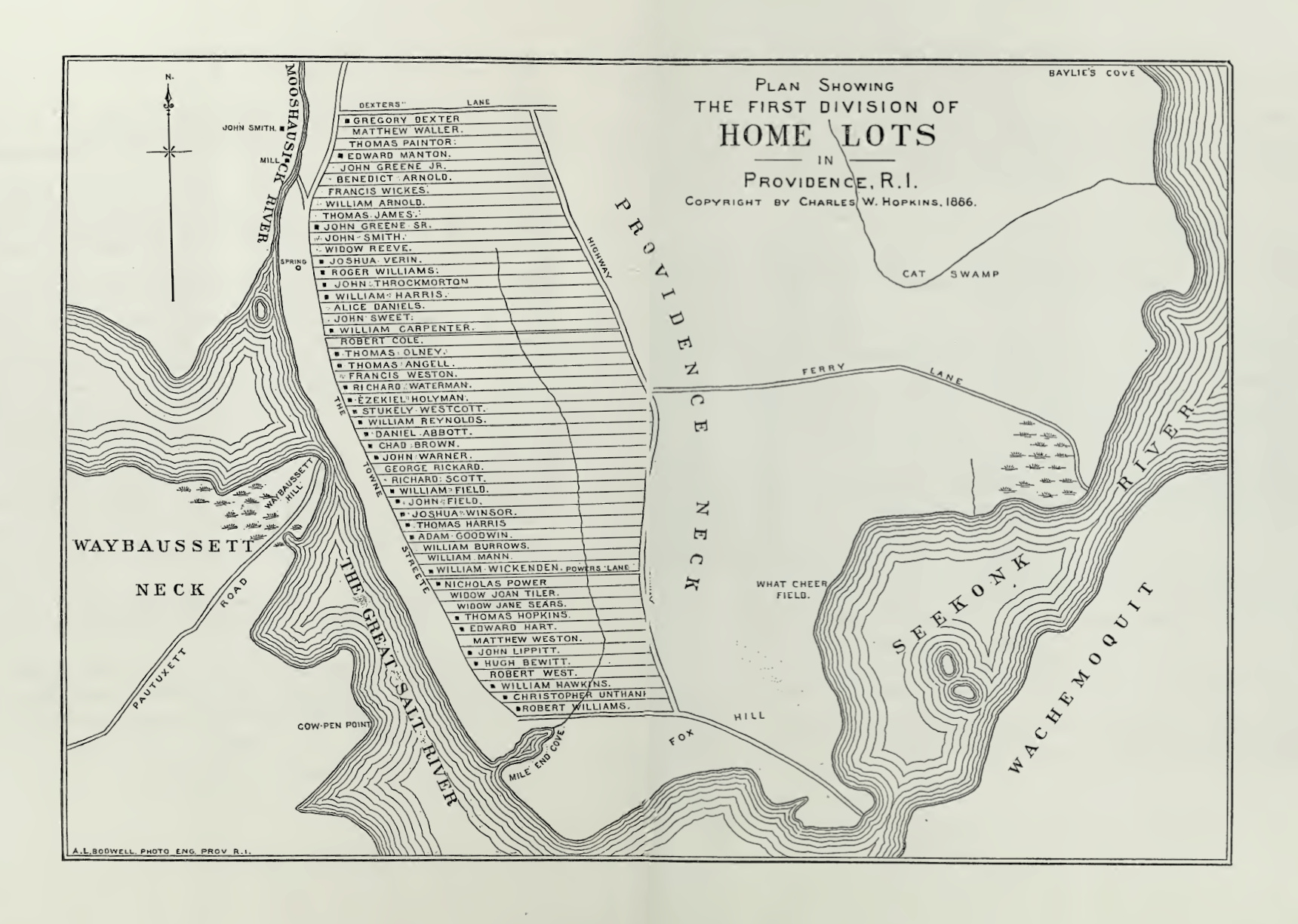
Providence home lots. James's lot is ninth from the top.

James moved to Providence by 1637 and received one of the original home lots on Towne Street (now North Main Street), situated between those of John Greene Sr. and William Arnold.

In mid‑1638, a Nipmuc man named Penowanyanquis was attacked on a native trail near Misquamsqueece (present‑day Seekonk). Three Narragansett men found him "barely able to crawl out of the brush and into the path," suffering wounds to his leg and abdomen. Roger Williams was notified and went to the wounded man, who was then brought toward Providence, where James and surgeon John Greene attended him. Despite their efforts, Penowanyanquis died. The indictment stated that the assailants "killed and robd one Penowanyanquis… & took from him fiue fadome of wampeux, and three coates of wollen cloth." James later testified at the Plymouth trial on 4 September 1638 alongside Williams, both affirming that the wounds were mortal. Three of the accused—Arthur Peach, Thomas Jackson, and Richard Stinnings—were executed, the first recorded execution of Englishmen for the murder of a Native American in New England.

On 8 October 1638, Thomas James was among the twelve “loving friends and neighbours” who, with Roger Williams, executed two foundational Providence land agreements. The first, the Initial Deed, granted equal rights in the Providence lands to the twelve proprietors for £30 (equivalent to US$7,090 in 2025) shared collectively. That same day, the proprietors signed the Pawtuxet Meadow Purchase, contributing £20 (equivalent to US$4,726 in 2025) for the adjoining meadow lands.

James was the scrivener (scribe) of the memorandum of 9 May 1639 written beneath a copy of the Narragansett Sachems' Deed of 24 March 1635/6, in which Canonicus and Miantonomoh granted Roger Williams “the lands and meadows upon the two fresh rivers called Mooshassuck and Wanasquatucket.” The 1639 memorandum, written in James’s hand and witnessed by Roger Williams and Benedict Arnold, reaffirmed the original grant and added only a privilege of grazing cattle “up the streams of Pautuckqut and Pawtuxet without limits.” This use-right clause was later controversially misinterpreted by William Harris to claim ownership of additional land.

Thomas James was also the scrivener of the town's first governing agreement, the Providence Civil Compact. Drafted by Williams, the Compact bound inhabitants to obey orders made for the public good, but only in “only in civil things.” Legal historian Leo Pfeffer called this limitation “the first time the principle of separation of church and state was definitely declared.”

In 1639, James sent a letter from Providence to John Winthrop asking whether Seekonk fell within the Massachusetts Bay patent and, if so, whether he might settle there under Winthrop's protection. He also requested that he not be punished for religious nonconformity causa inaudita ("without being heard"), and in a postscript he added: "I make bold to send mis. Wintrop a tame creature which she may dispose of as she please."

On 20 March 1639/40, James sold his "lands, rights, and privileges" in Providence and removed to New Haven Colony.

== New Haven (1639–1642) ==
On 3 November 1639, the General Court of New Haven transferred the lot of Francis Parrott to Thomas James. He was made a freeman on 11 June 1640 and was among those exempted from the general watch duty imposed on all men, alongside Governor Theophilus Eaton, the pastor, Samuell Eaton, and the two deacons. He was also granted meadow at the lower end of the Neck. He lived in New Haven until 1642, employed as a teacher without a pastoral charge.

== Mission to Virginia (1642–1643) ==
In October 1642 James joined William Thompson of Braintree and John Knowles of Watertown on a mission to minister to Puritans in Virginia. They arrived in Jamestown in January 1643 in response to a petition signed by about seventy Virginia Puritans requesting ministers from New England. The mission lasted eleven weeks and the ministers initially found "very loving and liberal entertainment" among sympathetic settlers. However, Governor Sir William Berkeley, acting under royal instructions to suppress religious nonconformity, soon ordered all nonconformists to leave the colony. In 1643 James, Thompson, and Knowles were expelled and returned to New England, accompanied by several Nansemond Puritans who left Virginia with them.

== New Haven (1643–1649) ==
Upon returning from Virginia, James resettled in New Haven, where the 1643 division of lands lists him among the planters with an estate valued at £200. On 24 February 1643/4 James was readmitted as a member of the General Court following his return from Virginia. (Note: The records of New Haven Colony distinguish between being "made freemen" and being "admitted members of the Court." In 1640 James had been both made a freeman and admitted a member of the court in the same ceremony. After 1643 in New Haven Colony only Court members ("free burgesses") could vote or hold power.) That same year the Court ordered that James, described as "sometime & elder in the Bay," should again have Francis Parrott's former lot and meadow. As a member of the trained band, James was subject to the colony's militia regulations, and in 1646 was fined 6d for appearing with a scabbard too short for his sword. On 2 October 1649 the Court transferred James's land to Richard Hull.

== Return to England and ejection ==
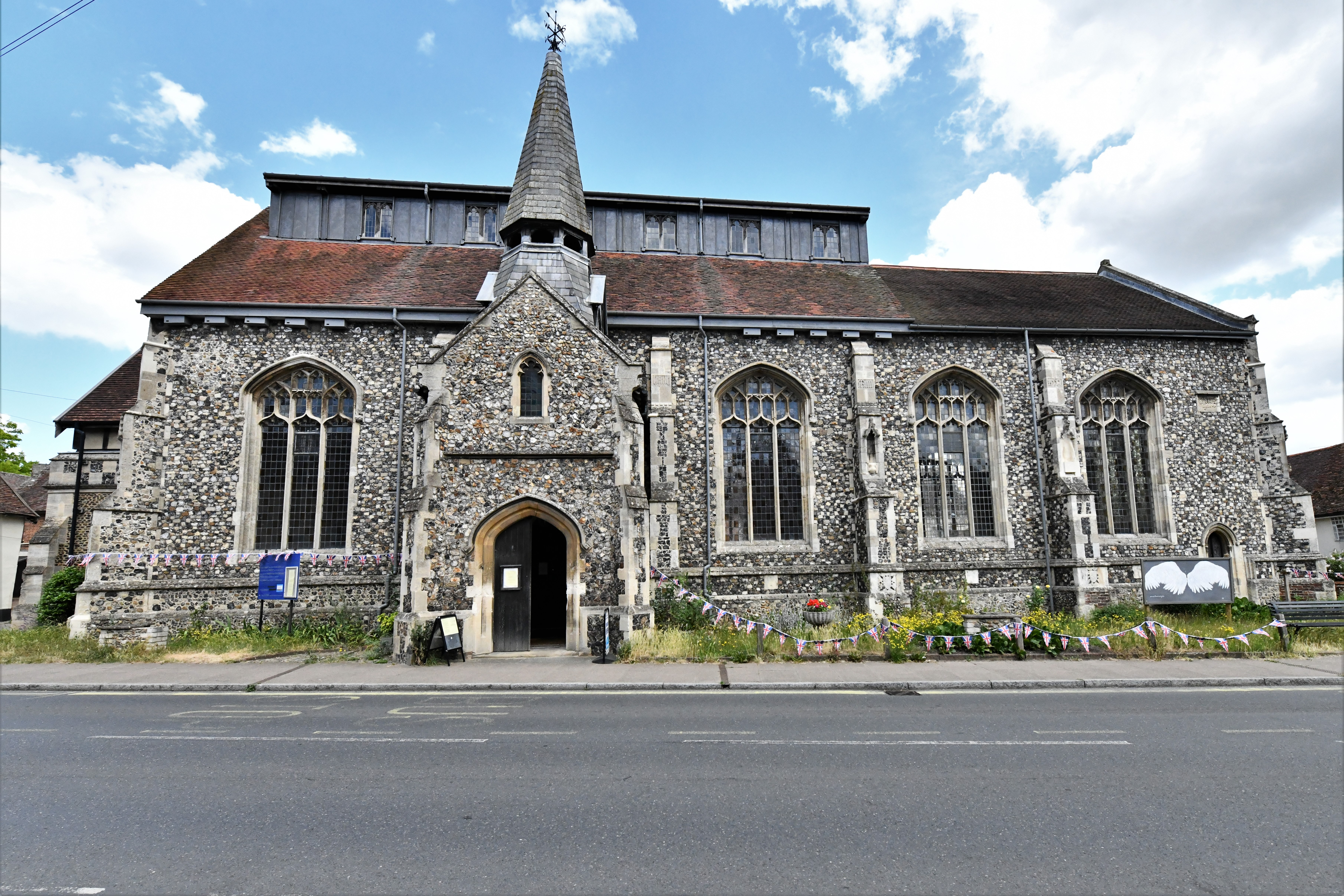
The chapel at Needham Market where Thomas James ministered until his ejection in 1662; renamed St John the Baptist’s Church when Needham Market became a parish in 1901.

James returned permanently to England by 1650, when he became minister at Needham Market, Suffolk. At that time the town's medieval chapel (now St. John the Baptist) functioned as a chapel of ease—providing a more convenient place of worship than the mother church at Barking—and James served there as the parish's Church of England curate.

He was ejected under the Act of Uniformity 1662 for refusing to conform to the restored Church of England. The Nonconformist’s Memorial later described him as “a very pious good man… after his ejectment he had a pretty numerous society,” referring to the group of former parishioners who continued to meet with him privately.

When Charles II issued the Declaration of Indulgence in 1672, temporarily suspending penalties against nonconformist worship, James applied for a preaching license identifying himself as “of the Congregationall pswasion.” The licence, issued on 10 June 1672, authorized him to preach in an “outhouse” (a private meeting‑place) belonging to Margaret Roger, a widow in Needham Market — the first legally recognized site of the town's independent congregation.

== Death and legacy ==
James died at Needham Market before 13 February 1682/3, when his will was proved. His will, dated 5 February 1682/3, distributed his books, household goods, and clothing to his son Thomas of Easthampton, Long Island, "in case he be living at the time of my death." In one passage he acknowledged "the affection the inhabitants have borne to my son in my affliction." He also made bequests to his grandchildren and great-grandchildren and left small legacies to Rev. John Fairfax and Paul Brooke Sr. The widow Elizabeth Frewer, "now with me," was granted the use of his house for one year after his death. James further directed funds "to bind out three poor widows' lads in the town of Needham," reflecting his concern for the parish poor.

He was buried on 16 February 1682/3 in the parish of Barking. A neighbor, Thomas Denny of Combs, later reported that although James "was much beloved and esteemed, yet when he died, the clergyman who came in his place would not allow him to be buried in any other part of the church-yard but the unconsecrated corner, left for rogues and excommunicates, though the clergyman owed his benefice to the noble uprightness of Mr. James's heart." (Note: The account originates with Thomas Denny of Combs, Suffolk, a neighbor who described himself as having known James personally. Denny's testimony was recorded by the colonial historian Thomas Prince, who lived at Combs between 1711 and 1716 and spoke with Denny directly. Prince published the account in the New England Chronicle, from which it was cited by Samuel G. Drake in his History and Antiquities of Boston (1856). An additional reference appears in the New England Historical and Genealogical Register, vol. 5, p. 382.)

James is primarily remembered for his role in several early New England developments. He served as founding pastor of the Charlestown church in Massachusetts Bay, participated in the early settlement of Providence, Rhode Island, and acted as scribe for the Providence Civil Compact, an early colonial agreement later noted for limiting civil authority to secular matters. He also testified in the 1638 Plymouth court proceedings following the killing of Penowanyanquis, one of the earliest recorded capital cases involving an English colonist and a Native American in New England.

== See also ==
- Murder of Penowanyanquis

== Sources ==
- Anderson, Robert Charles (1995). The Great Migration Begins: Immigrants to New England, 1620–1633. Vol. 2. Boston: New England Historic Genealogical Society.
- Aultman, Jennifer L. (1997). From Thanksgiving to War: Native Americans in Criminal Cases of Plymouth Colony, 1630–1675 (MA thesis). University of Virginia.
- Bradford, William (1856). Charles Deane (ed.). History of Plymouth Plantation. Boston: Little, Brown and Company.
- Budington, William Ives (1845). The History of the First Church, Charlestown. Boston: C. Tappan.
- Butterfield, Kevin (2020). "Puritans in Colonial Virginia". Encyclopedia Virginia. Virginia Humanities.
- Calamy, Edmund; Palmer, Samuel (1778). The Nonconformist's Memorial. Vol. 3. London: J. Buckland et al.
- Collections of the Rhode‑Island Historical Society. Vol. 5. Providence: Knowles and Vose. 1843. pp. 27, 33, 404, 577.
- Chapin, Howard M. (1916). Documentary History of Rhode Island: Being the History of the Towns of Providence and Warwick to 1649 and of the Colony to 1647 (PDF). Vol. 1. Providence: Preston and Rounds Company.
- "Deed: Thomas James to William Field, 1639". Rhode Island Historical Society.
- Drake, Samuel G. (1856). History and Antiquities of Boston. Boston: Luther Stevens. pp. 148–149.
- "Genealogical Gleanings in England". The New‑England Historical and Genealogical Register. 51. New England Historic Genealogical Society: 422. 1897.
- Gordon, Alexander (1917). Freedom after Ejection: A Review (1690–1692) of Presbyterian and Congregational Nonconformity in England and Wales. Manchester: University Press. p. 316.
- Grandjean, Katherine (2011). "The Long Wake of the Pequot War". Early American Studies. 9 (2): 379–411.
- "History St John's Church Needham Market". St John the Baptist, Needham Market. Needham Market Parochial Church Council.
- Hoadly, Charles J. (1857). Records of the Colony and Plantation of New Haven, from 1638 to 1649. Hartford: Case, Tiffany and Company.
- Hosken, T. J. (1920). History of Congregationalism in Suffolk. Ipswich: W. E. Harrison.
- Hunnewell, James F. (1888). A History of Charlestown, Massachusetts, 1775–1887. Boston: Little, Brown, and Company.
- Jacobus, Donald Lines; Torrey, Clarence Almon (1942). "James, Mellowes and Ingoldsby Family Connections". The American Genealogist. 11: 26–28.
- Levy, Babette M. (1956). "Early Puritanism in the Southern and Island Colonies". Proceedings of the American Antiquarian Society. 66: 124–126.
- Nason, Elias (1871). The History of Charlestown, Massachusetts. Boston: A. Williams & Co.
- Pearl, Tobey (2021). Terror to the Wicked: America's First Trial by Jury That Ended a War and Helped to Form a Nation. New York: Pantheon.
- Pfeffer, Leo (2018). Church, State, and Freedom (2018 reprint ed.). Eugene, Oregon: Wipf & Stock Publishers. ISBN 9781532644528.
- Richardson, Douglas (2011). Kimball G. Everingham (ed.). Magna Carta Ancestry: A Study in Colonial and Medieval Families. Vol. 1 (2nd ed.). Salt Lake City: the author. p. 347.
- Sprague, William Buell (1857). Annals of the American Pulpit. Vol. 1. New York: Robert Carter & Brothers.
- Steiner, Bruce E. (1981). "Dissension at Quinnipiac: The Authorship and Setting of A Discourse about Civil Government in a New Plantation Whose Design Is Religion". The New England Quarterly. 54 (1): 14–32. JSTOR 365729.
- Swan, Bradford F. (1963). The Rev. Thomas James, the Civil Compact, and the Town Evidence. Providence: Roger Williams Press.
- Venn, John; J. A. Venn (1940). Alumni Cantabrigienses. Vol. Part I, Vol. II (Chalmers–Fytche). Cambridge University Press. p. 460.
- Watson, Ian (2020). "The Dating of the Providence Civil Compact". The American Genealogist. 91 (3–4): 165–176.
- Weeden, William B. (1910). Early Rhode Island: A Social History of the People. New York: The Grafton Press.
- Winthrop Papers. Vol. 4. Boston: Massachusetts Historical Society. 1947.
- Winthrop, John (1908). James Kendall Hosmer (ed.). Winthrop's Journal, 1630–1649. Vol. 1. New York: Charles Scribner's Sons.
- Winthrop, John (1908). James Kendall Hosmer (ed.). Winthrop's Journal, 1630–1649. Vol. 2. New York: Charles Scribner's Sons.
