= Thomas James (minister, born 1620) =

- Rev Thomas James marker
- U.S. Historic district – Contributing property
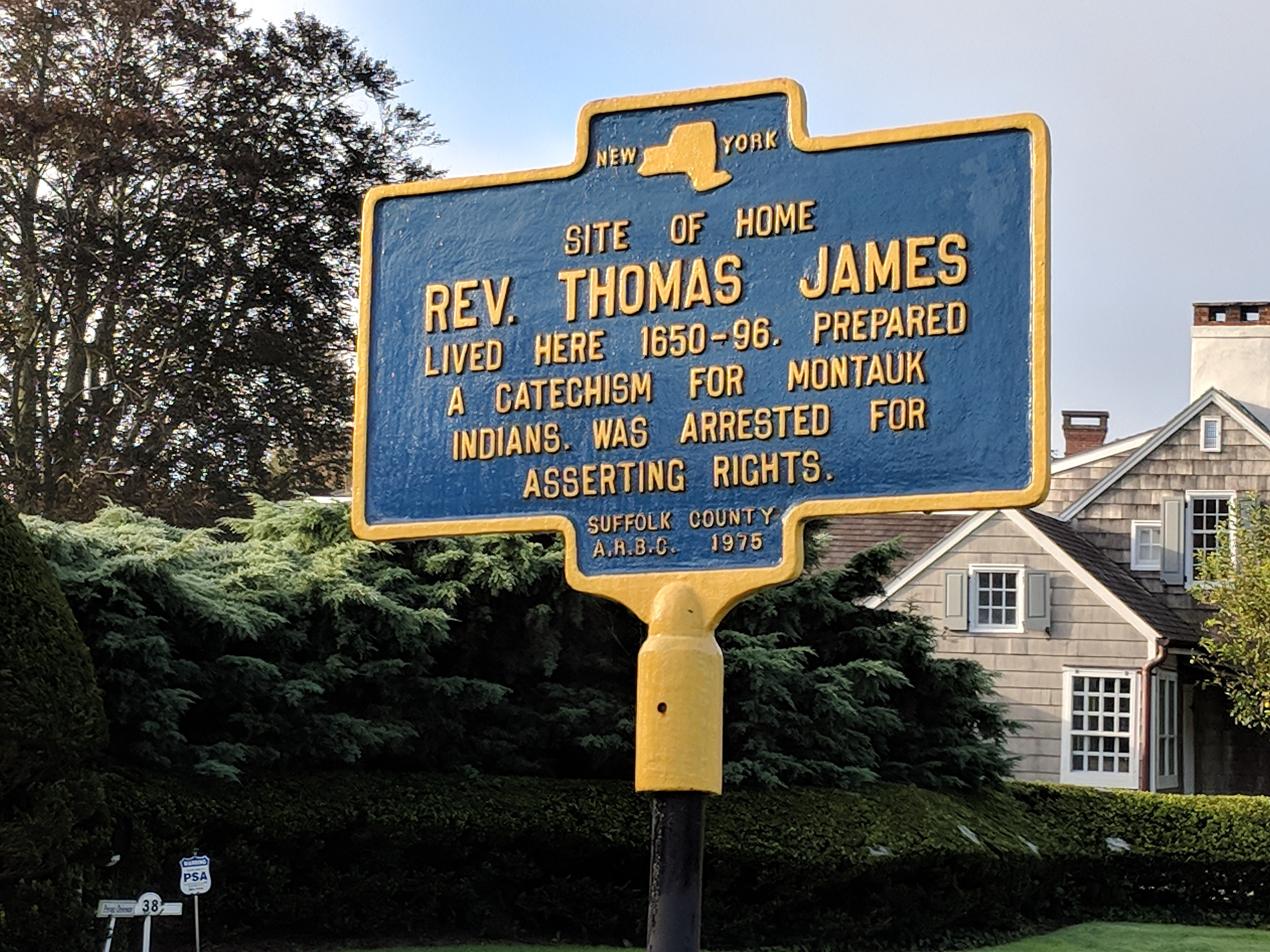
- Thomas James historic marker 20180916 2018

- Location within New York Location within the United States
- Location: 36 James Lane, East Hampton, New York
- Coordinates: 40.954843°N 72.192456°W
- Part of: East Hampton Village District (ID74001309)
- Designated CP: May 2, 1974

Rev. Thomas James, Jr. (1620-1698) was a Puritan minister in East Hampton, Long Island, during the late 17th century. In 1648, the first inhabitants of East Hampton arrived, having mostly migrated from Maidstone, a town in Kent, England. Prior to reaching eastern Long Island, they made a stopover in Lynn, Massachusetts, and then moved on to Connecticut. Their journey to America was primarily driven by religious persecution and oppressive governmental regulations. These settlers sought not just religious freedom, but also civil liberties.

== Early years ==
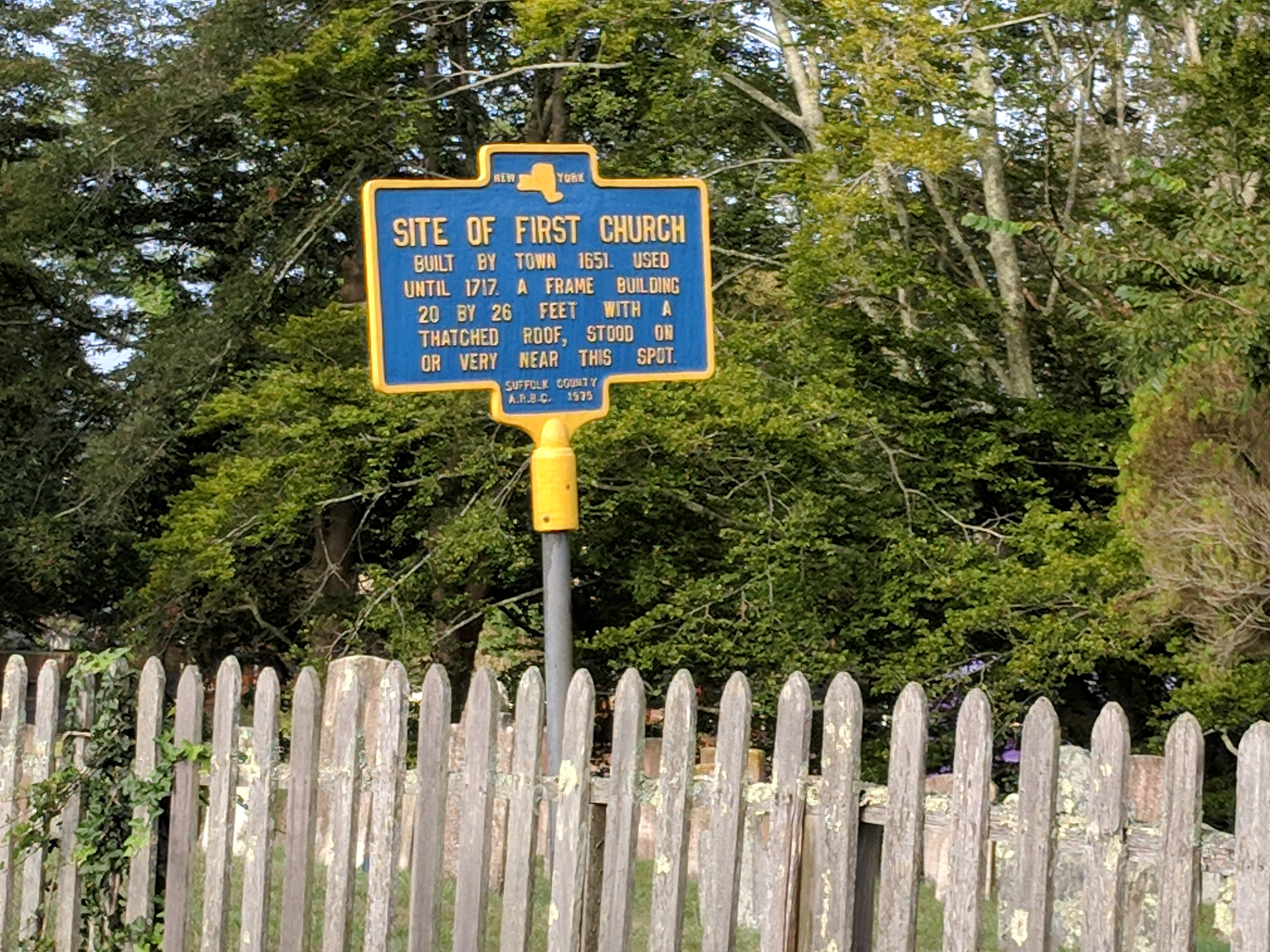
First Congregational Church historical marker

Rev. Thomas James Jr. was the son of a minister with the same name who had emigrated from Lincolnshire, England with his family. The senior James (1595 - 1683) had first settled in Boston in 1632 before moving to the Charlestown church for 3 1/2 years and then later to New Haven, Connecticut. However, Rev. James Sr. was not well-liked by his congregation in New Haven and eventually returned to England, while his son remained in America. Approximately 7 to 10 percent of the settlers went back to England after 1640, which included roughly one-third of the clergymen.

He was born in 1620 in Newbury, Massachusetts, and received his education at Harvard College, where he graduated in 1643. After completing his studies, he served as a schoolteacher in Ipswich and Rowley before moving to East Hampton in 1650 to become the minister of the town's Congregational Church (Later 1st. Presbyterian).

The East Hampton Town Trustees felt comfortable with Governor Winthrop of Connecticut and had gone to see him about finding a minister. Rev. Thomas James Jr. was eventually hired for the position in August 1651, having also been invited to be a chaplain on Gardiner's Island by Lion Gardiner.

Rev. James Jr. was highly regarded by Judge Henry P. Hedges, who described him as "learned, resolutely just, sincere, fearless, active, and had a powerful personality." He was also considered a "feisty Puritan" and was well-versed in public affairs, in addition to his role as a guide in politics, laws, morals, and religion.

In those times, attending church on Sunday mornings was mandatory, and those who did not attend were fined one shilling. Additionally, a fine of 10 shillings was imposed on anyone caught working on the Sabbath, and those who refused to pray were sent to the stockade. Rev. James Jr. was also expected to give two-hour sermons on Sunday mornings. Sunday was considered a day of rest, so there was little else for people to do. These strict rules and expectations reflect the Puritan emphasis on strict religious and moral codes, which were enforced by both social pressure and legal consequences.

== Home life ==
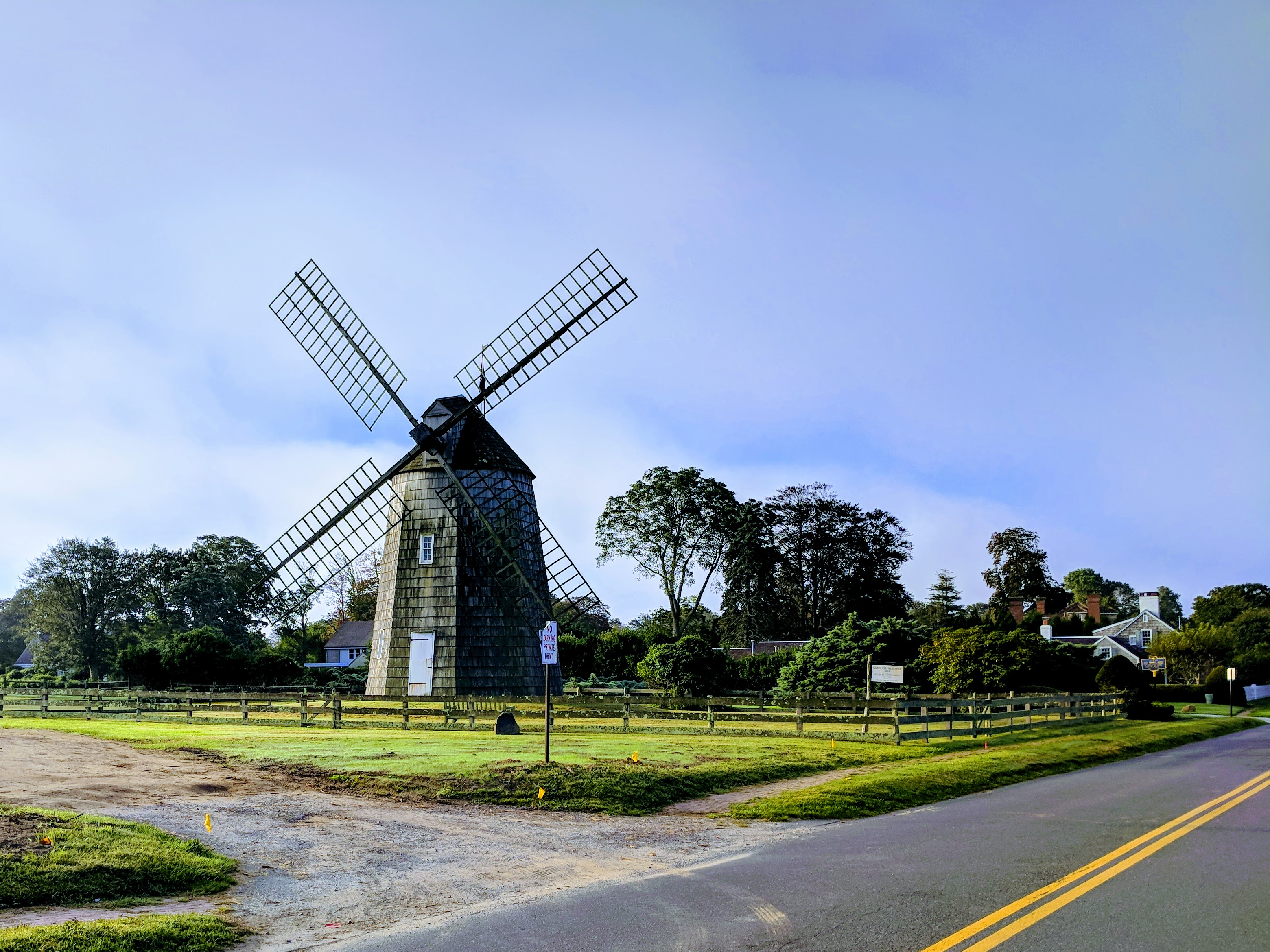
Site of Rev. Thomas James home circa 1690

It is probable that Rev. Thomas James got married for the first time in Connecticut to an unknown person. On September 2, 1669, he married Katherine Blux from Southampton for his second marriage. Although there is information that he had ten children, it is unclear which wife was the mother of all of them, and the birth dates of the children are also unknown. Some of his children married into nearby families. Peregrine Stansborough of Sagaponack married Rev. Thomas James's daughter, Sarah, on December 15, 1664, suggesting that Sarah was likely from his first marriage.

When Rev. James was hired, his salary was 45 English pounds per year ( £6,600.00), which was twice what Lion Gardiner had offered him to be the minister on Gardiner's Island. The following year, his salary went up to 50 pounds. His salary was paid from the taxes collected from the citizens, and he was exempt from paying taxes himself.

As part of his compensation, Rev. James was given a home and 12 acres of land, some of which was used for fuel and the rest for farming. He was also given the privilege of being the first person to grind grain at the mill on Monday, which was the second day of the week.

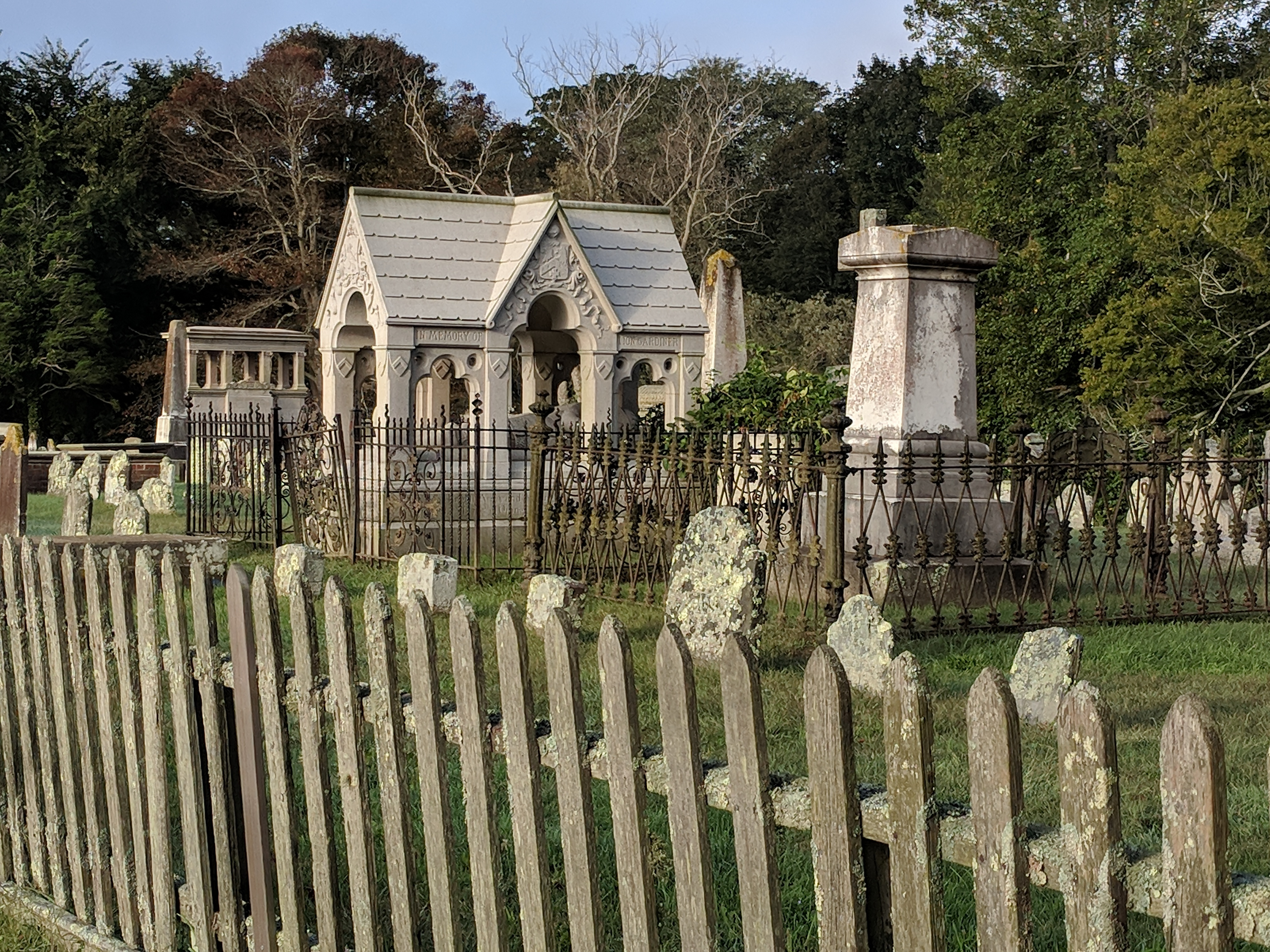
South End Burying Ground, East Hampton, NY

Rev. James's house was located next to the Gardiner house on what is now James Lane. The Meeting House, where Rev. James preached, was also located on the same property, which is now the South End Cemetery. The cemetery was originally the South End Burying Ground, and it was connected to the church or Meeting House. The whole area was fenced in for protection. Rev. James also interacted with the local Native American population, the Montauks. He learned the Indian language and taught them the English language. The Indians sometimes even worshiped with him. The friendly relationship between the colonists and the Native Americans is in part what led the Sachem Wyandanch to consider an alliance with the town.

== Town Trustee ==
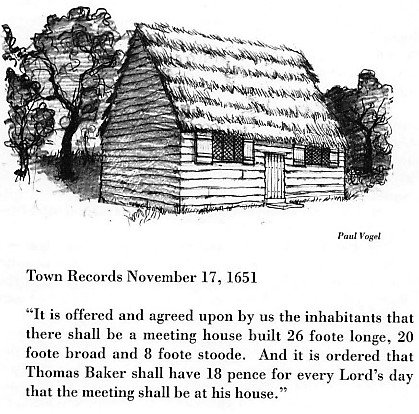
First church

Rev. James served as the minister of the East Hampton church for almost 50 years, from 1650 until his death in 1698. During his tenure, he was highly respected by his parishioners and was known for his dedication to their rights and interests.

Rev. James was not only the Town minister but also a member of the Town Trustees, and he was elected repeatedly. He also served as the Clerk of the Trustees, likely due to his writing skills, and was responsible for keeping the Town Records. However, he did not keep good records of births, deaths, and marriages for the church or the town, and these dates are missing from the records. The reason for this is unclear, with some speculating that he was too busy with other duties or that there had been a fire that destroyed the records.

The Town Trustees had various responsibilities, including hiring someone to ring the church bell, renting church pews, and finding a leader for psalm singing. They also enacted laws against slander and personal violence, which were based on the laws in Connecticut.

== Arrest ==
In 1686, Rev. James became involved in a dispute with the government of New York, which had jurisdiction over East Hampton. He and several other East Hampton citizens were arrested for protesting against being part of New York and for selling whale oil in Connecticut without paying taxes. Rev. James preached a fiery sermon in support of his parishioners, which led to a warrant being issued for his arrest. He spent three weeks in jail before being released on the grounds that he was a loyal subject of King James II.

Rev. James was not alone in his opposition to the state government. Many other towns and villages in what is now known as Long Island were also unhappy with the way they were being governed by the New York colony. In fact, in 1683, a number of towns including East Hampton, Southampton, and Southold banded together to form the Duke of York's Laws. These laws allowed for a greater degree of local self-governance, and were seen as a way for the colonists to protect their rights.

Despite these efforts, the state government continued to exert its influence over East Hampton and other towns. In 1691, the New York colony passed a new law that revoked the Duke of York's Laws and brought all of Long Island under the control of the state government. This move was deeply unpopular with many of the colonists, who saw it as a violation of their rights and freedoms.

== Writings ==
Rev. James was a prolific writer and is known for his publication, "The Book of Common Prayer Reformed According to the Plan of the Late Dr. Samuel Clarke," which was printed in 1690. He also wrote extensively on theological subjects and was a respected scholar.

During the mid-1690s, Rev. James was unable to perform all of his duties, prompting the Trustees to appoint Rev. Nathaniel Huntting as his assistant. Despite this, Rev. James still carried out some of his responsibilities. Rev. Huntting owned the property where the Huntting Inn, also known as The Palm, is located today.

== Passing ==
Rev. Thomas James died on June 16, 1698, and was buried in the South End Burying Ground in East Hampton. He was remembered by his parishioners as a dedicated minister who always had their interests at heart. His final wishes were that he be buried in a manner that would allow him to face his congregation on the day of resurrection. His gravestone bears the inscription, "MR. THOMAS JAMES DYED THE 16 DAY OF JUNE IN THE YEARE 1698 HE WAS MINISTAR OF THE GOSPELL AND PASTUR OF THE CHURCH OF CHRIST."

== See also ==
- Poggatacut (sachem)
- John Lyon Gardiner Mill Cottage
