= Providence Combination of 1640 =

1640 agreement establishing representative democracy in Providence Plantation

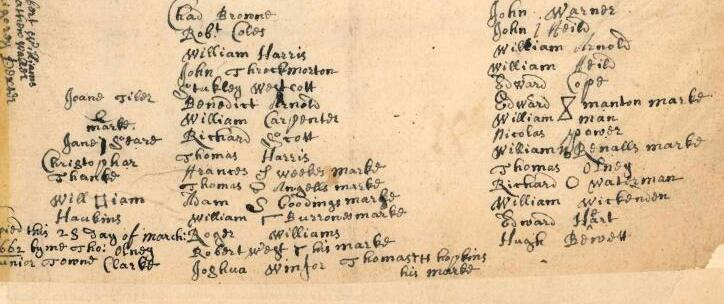
- Copy of signatures on Combination
- Date effective: August 6 [O.S. July 27], 1640
- Superseded: March 24, 1649 [O.S. March 14, 1648]
- Author(s): Robert Coles, Chad Browne, William Harris, and John Warner
- Signatories: 39 male and female inhabitants of Providence
- Purpose: To establish civil government by arbitration, elected officials, and liberty of conscience

Full text
- The Federal and State Constitutions/Plantation agreement at Providence at Wikisource

The Providence Combination of 1640, referred to then as the Combination & Plantation Agreement, (Note: Earliest known copy, dated 1662 by Thomas Olney Junior, Town Clerk of Providence, the Rhode Island Historical Society collection, Providence Town Paper 02; MSS 214 SG1 S1 Box 1 #02.) established a civil government for the Providence Plantation, which encompassed what is now Providence and parts of Cranston and Pawtucket in Rhode Island. This document stands as the first governmental instrument in Western history to explicitly mention "liberty of conscience."

The Combination—so named because it "combined" the inhabitants into a unified civil body—brought several groundbreaking advancements to colonial governance, including a democratic government based on arbitration, the formal acknowledgment of liberty of conscience as a fundamental right, and the unprecedented inclusion of women as signatories to a political agreement.

== Articles of the Combination ==
The Combination, drafted on August 6 [O.S. July 27], 1640, by elected committee members Robert Coles, Chad Browne, William Harris, and John Warner, contained twelve articles establishing representative government and guaranteeing religious freedom.

- Article 1 (Land boundaries): Established specific geographic boundaries between private properties in Pawtuxet and the common lands of Providence, using natural landmarks like springs, rivers, and a marked oak tree.
- Article 2 (Five Disposers and Liberty of Conscience): Created a system of five elected officials ("Disposers") to manage land distribution, town finances, and governance, while explicitly guaranteeing "liberty of Conscience" to all inhabitants.
- Article 3 (Government by arbitration): Established a multi-tiered arbitration system for dispute resolution, with voluntary arbitration encouraged and a formalized process for compelling arbitration when necessary.
- Article 4 (Priority resolution): Authorized the disposers to intervene proactively in matters concerning "the peace of the state" or when "any person abuse an other person or goods."
- Article 5 (Public order): Required all inhabitants to assist in apprehending wrongdoers ("to combine ourselves to assist any man in the pursuit of any party delinquent"), creating a community-based system of mutual protection.
- Article 6 (Special sessions): Established provisions for calling special town meetings for urgent matters that "cannot be deferred till general meeting of the towne."
- Article 7 (Land deeds): Required the five disposers to provide formal deeds to all landowners for their properties "to hould it by for after ages" (inheritable).
- Articles 8-9 (Regular meetings): Established monthly meetings of the five disposers and quarterly town meetings for all inhabitants, with the town clerk responsible for organizing these gatherings.
- Article 10 (Clerk compensation): Set compensation for the town clerk at 4 pence for recording each cause and 12 pence for creating land deeds, with annual rotation of the position.
- Article 11 (Prior arrangements): Confirmed that all previous land disposals made during the dispute period would remain valid.
- Article 12 (Community membership fee): Required settlers who had only paid 10 shillings to contribute an additional 20 shillings to match the 30-shilling fee paid by original purchasers, establishing uniform fees for all community members.

== Innovations in colonial governance ==
The Providence Combination of 1640 introduced several significant innovations that distinguished it from other colonial documents of the era. These developments established Providence as a unique settlement in colonial America, with distinctive principles and practices.

=== Arbitration-based governance ===
One of the drafters, Robert Coles, had served as an elected representative to the Massachusetts Bay's General Court when arbitration was adopted there, bringing this procedural knowledge to Providence. While arbitration was practiced in Massachusetts Bay Colony as one method among many for settling disputes, the Combination elevated it to the central mechanism of governance. (Note: During Coles's term in the General Court in 1632, "Massachusetts Bay became the first colony to adopt formal arbitration laws.")

The Combination created a structure where five elected "disposers" managed civil affairs, but disputes were first to be resolved through mutual arbitration between parties. Only when voluntary arbitration failed would the disposers select additional arbitrators to make binding decisions. (Note: As specified in Article III of the Combination: "for them to choose two men to arbitrate his cause, and if these foure men chosen by every partie do end the cause, then to see theire determination performed and the faultive to pay the Arbitrators for theire time spent in it: But if these foure men doe not end it, then for the 5 disposers to choose three men to put an end to it...") This systematic implementation of arbitration represented a significant departure from the magistrate-centered governance of other colonies, institutionalizing a more collaborative decision-making process that emphasized consensus and compromise over authority. (Note: The preamble to the Combination reflects this collaborative ethos, stating that the arbitrators "have seriously and carefully indeavoured to weigh and consider all those differences, being desirous to bringe to unity and peace.")

=== Positive liberty of conscience ===
Providence marked a groundbreaking shift in religious liberty by evolving from merely limiting state interference to actively protecting individual conscience. The 1637 Civil Compact restricted government authority to "only in civil things," establishing a negative liberty—freedom from state-imposed religious control. However, this framework left individuals exposed to private coercion, particularly within households.

This limitation became evident in the 1638 Joshua Verin case, in which he was disfranchised for beating his wife, Jane Verin, after she attended prayer meetings against his will. The community ruled that liberty of conscience must extend into the domestic sphere and be protected from private interference. (Note: Eberle notes: "The Verin case is an important early recognition in young America of the value and meaning of liberty of conscience... That such liberty could extend to women as well as men speaks to the early emergence of women as independent human beings in Rhode Island.")

Governor John Winthrop of Massachusetts Bay observed with concern that in Providence even "wives, children, and servants" claimed the right to attend religious meetings, indicating that liberty of conscience was broadly understood to override patriarchal authority. (Note: Winthrop wrote: "For whereas... Mr. Williams and the rest did make an order, that no man should be molested for his conscience, now men's wives, and children, and servants, claimed liberty hereby to go to all religious meetings..." His account reflects concern that domestic authority was being undermined in favor of individual religious autonomy.)

Roger Williams explicitly defended this principle in The Bloudy Tenent of Persecution (1644), Chapter LXXXIX, where he argues that “masters of families under the gospel [are] not charged to force all under him from their own consciences to his,” and insists that even “child or servant” may not be compelled in matters of worship. (Note: In The Bloudy Tenent of Persecution (1644), Chap. LXXXIX, Williams begins his argument by citing 1 Corinthians 7:12–15 to show that a Christian husband may not force an unbelieving wife’s conscience, and must even allow her to depart “for conscience’ sake.” He extends this principle to children and servants, insisting that domestic authority under the gospel includes no power to compel religious worship. Because “families are the foundations of government; for what is a commonweal but a commonweal of families,” Williams concludes that civil magistrates likewise possess no authority to coerce conscience.) Williams presents the household as the foundational analogy demonstrating that civil magistrates likewise possess no authority to coerce conscience.

Providence codified this broader understanding in the 1640 Combination: "Wee agree, as formerly hath bin the liberties of the town, so still, to hould forth liberty of Conscience." This marked a transition from passive non-interference to an active commitment to protecting conscience. This shift anticipates what philosopher Isaiah Berlin (1909–1997) would later describe as a movement from negative to positive liberty. (Note: Berlin, writing in the mid-20th century, distinguished two kinds of freedom: negative liberty—freedom from external interference—and positive liberty—freedom as self-determination, requiring conditions that enable autonomous action. Providence's proactive protection of individual conscience, even against private domination, mirrors this latter model.)

This 1640 Combination contrasts sharply with the First Amendment to the United States Constitution, which guarantees only a negative right: "Congress shall make no law respecting an establishment of religion, or prohibiting the free exercise thereof." The First Amendment protects against government interference and coercion, but does not obligate the state to shield individuals from private coercion. (Note: In Cantwell v. Connecticut, Justice Owen Roberts wrote: "The constitutional inhibition of legislation on the subject of religion has a double aspect... [It] safeguards the free exercise of the chosen form of religion." The Court has consistently maintained that First Amendment protections apply only against state action, not private conduct. As explicitly stated in Hudgens v. NLRB: "the constitutional guarantee of free speech is a guarantee only against abridgment by government, federal or state... [it] is not applicable to private action.") Moreover, First Amendment protections applied to state governments only after incorporation through the Fourteenth Amendment to the United States Constitution in the 20th century. (Note: As Justice Owen Roberts wrote in Cantwell: "The fundamental concept of liberty embodied in [the Fourteenth] Amendment embraces the liberties guaranteed by the First Amendment... The Fourteenth Amendment has rendered the legislatures of the states as incompetent as Congress to enact such laws.")

A year after the Combination, even neighboring Newport's 1641 Statutes granted only limitations on government coercion in religious matters, stating: "none bee accounted a delinquent for doctrine: provided, it be not directly repugnant to ye government." Providence's model thus stands as a rare colonial example of positive liberty in action: not merely freedom from government interference, but a community-affirmed right to believe and worship, or refrain from worship—even in defiance of patriarchal and private authority.

=== Female political participation ===
The inclusion of two women—Joane Tyler and Jane Sayes (also spelled Sears), both widows and heads of household—among the 39 signatories marked a distinct and radical departure from prevailing colonial norms. (Note: Eberle states: "Thus, Providence most likely made the original claim for equality in status between men and women in matters of conscience on American shores.") Previous agreements in other American colonies such as the Mayflower Compact (1620), the Cambridge Agreement (1629), the Salem Covenant (1629), the Watertown Covenant (1630), the Massachusetts Oath of a Freeman (1630s), the Dedham Covenant (1636), the Fundamental Orders of Connecticut (1639), the Portsmouth Compact (1639), and the New Haven Fundamental Agreement (1639) all restricted civic participation to men. In every case, only male freemen—typically church members or landowners—were permitted to sign compacts, vote, or hold office.

Providence's more inclusive approach may have been influenced by Indigenous governance models in the region. Nations such as the Narragansett, Wampanoag, Pequot, and Mohegan had political systems in which women held meaningful decision-making roles as saunkskwa (female leaders). (Note: In Narragansett and Wampanoag societies, the term saunkskwa was used for female leaders rather than the colonial term "squaw sachem.") A notable example of Indigenous female leadership known to early colonists was the "Squaw Sachem of Mistick" (c. 1590-1650/1667), who ruled the Pawtucket Confederation lands and signed multiple land deeds with Massachusetts settlers in the 1630s. (Note: Colonial records show the Squaw Sachem of Mistick ruled Pawtucket Confederation lands after her husband Nanepashemet's death in 1619 and maintained significant political authority recognized by English colonists in land transactions.) Female Narragansett-Niantic leader Quaiapen (c. 1603–1676), who married into the family of sachem Canonicus around 1630, would have been visible to early Rhode Island settlers.

Other early signs of women's autonomy were emerging in Providence. In 1638, the town permitted Alice Daniels—a respected apothecary who had previously treated Massachusetts Governor John Winthrop—to marry John Greene Sr., despite Massachusetts having denied her petition for a divorce from her unfaithful husband in England. John Greene later became a vocal defender of Jane Verin's liberty of conscience during her husband's disciplinary trial. (Note: During the Verin trial debate, "One Greene replied that if they should restrain their wives, all the women in the country would cry out of [against] them.") This spirit of female independence extended beyond Providence to nearby Portsmouth, Rhode Island, founded in 1638 by Anne Hutchinson, a prominent religious leader who had been banished from Boston for her theological challenges to authority. (Note: Eberle compares the cases: "In Boston, Massachusetts Bay banished Anne Hutchinson for acts of conscience... Not surprisingly, it was Roger Williams who extended the helping hand that got her settled at Aquidneck, now Portsmouth.")

== Dissolution ==
Roger Williams secured a Patent from Parliament for "the Providence Plantations in Narragansett Bay" in 1644. The first meeting of the colony's General Assembly under this Patent occurred in 1647. However, Providence itself continued to operate under the Combination until it finally received a town charter of incorporation on March 24, 1649 [O.S. March 14, 1648], granted at a session of the General Assembly held at Warwick.

17th-century copies of the 1640 Combination

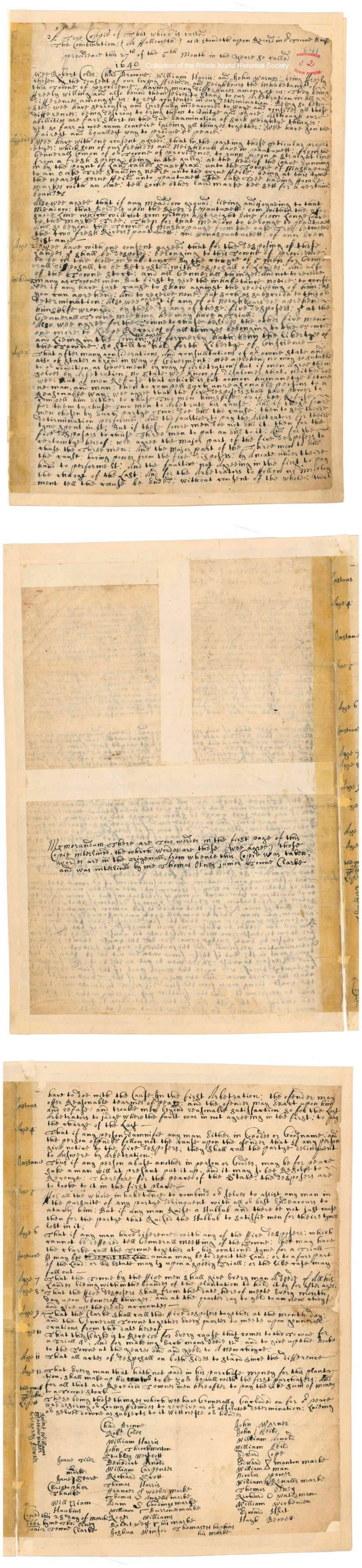
02

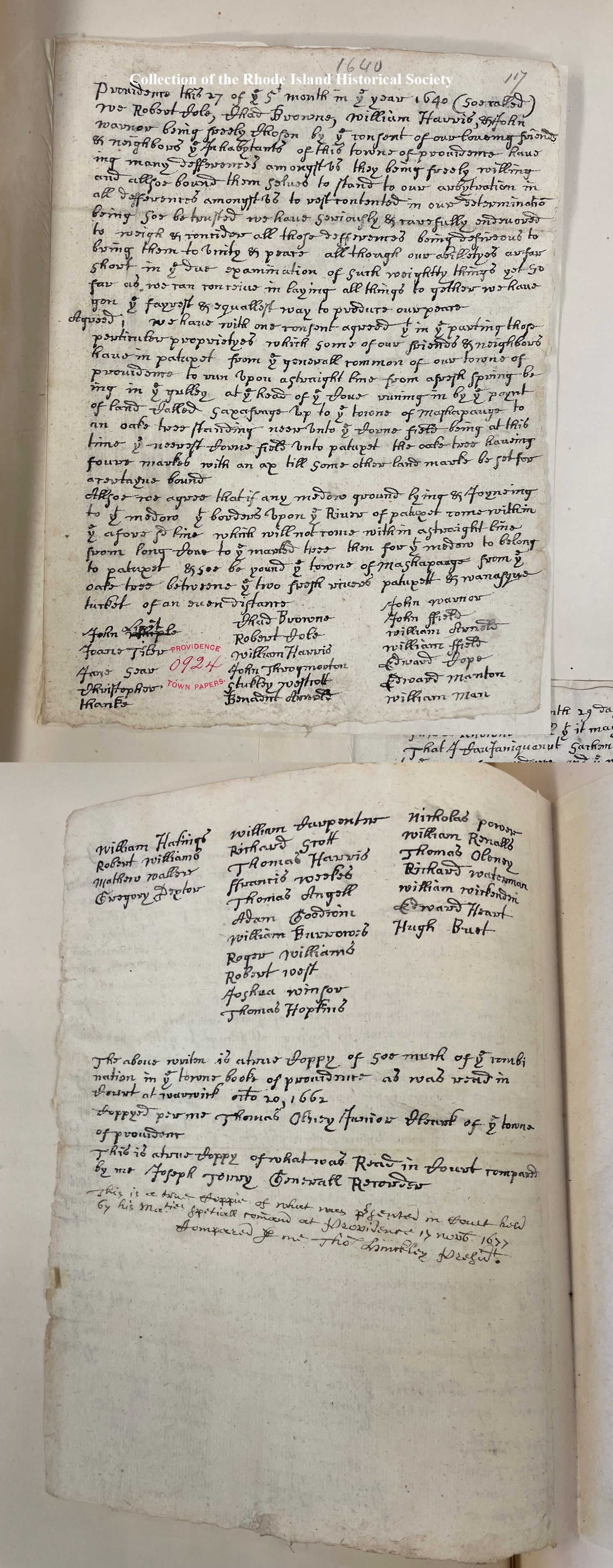
0924

The original 1640 Combination is presumed no longer to exist. However, two historical copies provide the document's content and signatories.

=== Providence Town Papers 02 ===
This handwritten copy, held in the Rhode Island Historical Society collection (MSS 214 SG1 S1 Box 1 #02), bears a red catalog mark "PROVIDENCE TOWN PAPERS 02." It was created on April 7 [O.S. March 28] 1662 by Thomas Olney Junior, Town Clerk of Providence. The heading is "A True Coppie of that which is called the Combination: (& plantation Agreement:) as it standeth upon Record in Providence this 27th of the 5th Month in the yeare so called 1640." In the Julian calendar, the 5th month was July, making July 27, 1640, the Old Style date. When converted to the modern system, it aligns with August 6, 1640, in the Gregorian calendar.

The document bears a certification note by Olney indicating it is a true copy of the original, with only one noted correction: "Memorandum. The lost and true words in the first page of this Copie missing, the which words are these (we agree:) those words are in the originall, from whence this Copie was taken and was inserted by me Thomas Olney Junior Clerke." This copy includes all twelve articles of the original agreement along with their accompanying "instances" - practical examples that explain how each article should be applied in real situations. The instances appear as marginal notes labeled "Instans" in the document.

=== Providence Town Papers 0924 ===
This handwritten copy, held in the Rhode Island Historical Society collection (MSS 214 SG1 S2 Vol. 3 #0924), bears a red catalog mark "PROVIDENCE TOWN PAPERS 0924." The initial clause is "Providence the 27 of the 5th moneth in the year 1640 (Soe called)" The document is an extract containing primarily Article 1 regarding boundary descriptions between Pawtuxet and Providence, and lacking the full text of the remaining eleven articles. The document features three certifications:

- "The above written is a true Coppy of soe much of [the] itemly written in [the] towne booke of providence as was read wrote in Court at warwick october 20, 1662" certified by "Thomas Olney Junior Clerke of [the] towne of providence"
- "This is a true coppy of what was Read in Court compared by me Joseph Torrey Generall Recorder" (undated)
- A third certification dated December 25 [O.S. December 15] 1670 with the signature of an official who compared this copy

This extract was prepared for and presented in court proceedings at Warwick possibly concerning land boundary disputes related to Article 1.

== Full text of the Combination ==
A transcription of the 1640 Combination, with a title not recorded in the extant copies, appears in Records of the Colony of Rhode Island and Providence Plantations in New England (Providence, 1856) published by the Rhode Island General Assembly. The transcription in this volume was based primarily on Thomas Olney Junior's complete copy (Providence Town Papers 02), as it contains all twelve articles and their accompanying instances with minor spelling differences.

Report of Arbitrators at Providence, containing proposals for a form of Government.

Providence the 27th of the 5th mo. in the yeare (so called) 1640.

Wee, Robert Coles, Chad Browne, William Harris, and John Warner, being freely chosen by the consent of our louing freinds and neighbours the Inhabitants of this Towne of Providence, having many differences amongst us, they being freely willing and also bound themselves to stand to our Arbitration in all differences amongst us to rest contented in our determination, being so betrusted we have seriously and carefully indeavoured to weigh and consider all those differences, being desirous to bringe to vnity and peace, although our abilities are farr short in the due examination of such weighty things, yet so farre as we conceive in laying all things together we have gone the fairest and the equallest way to produce our peace.

I. Agreed, We have with one consent agreed that in the parting those particler proprieties which some of our freinds and neighbours have in Patuxit, from the general Common of our towne of Providence, to run vppon a streight line from a fresh spring being in the Gulley, at the head of that cove running by that point of land called Saxafras vnto the towne of Mashapawog, to an oake tree standing neere vnto the corne field, being at this time the neerest corne field vnto Patuxit, the oake tree having four marks with an axe, till some other land marke be set for a certaine bound. Also, we agree that if any meadow ground lyeing and joineing to that Meadow, that borders vppon the River of Patuxit come within the aforesaid line, which will not come within a streight line from long Cove to the marked tree, then for that meadow to belong to Patuxit, and so beyond the towne of Mashipauge from the oake tree between the two fresh Rivers Pawtuxitt and Wanasquatucket of an even Distance.

2. Agreed. We have with one consent agreed that for the disposeing, of those lands that shall be disposed belonging to this towne of Providence to be in the whole Inhabitants by the choise of five men for generall disposall, to be betrusted with disposall of lands and also of the townes Stocke, and all Generall things and not to receive in any six dayes as townsmen, but first to give the Inhabitants notice to consider if any have just cause to shew against the receiving of him as you can apprehend, and to receive none but such as subscribe to this our determination. Also, we agree that if any of our neighbours doe apprehend himselfe wronged by these 5 or any of these 5 disposers, that at the Generall towne meeting he may have a tryall.

Alsoe wee agree for the towne to choose beside the other five men one or more to keepe Record of all things belonging to the towne and lying in Common.

Wee agree, as formerly hath bin the liberties of the town, so still, to hould forth liberty of Conscience.

III. Agreed, that after many Considerations and Consultations of our owne State and also of States abroad in way of government, we apprehend, no way so suitable to our Condition as government by way of arbitration. But if men agree themselves by arbitration, no State we know of disallows that, neither doe we: But if men refuse that which is but common humanity between man and man, then to compel such vnreasonable persons to a reasonable way, we agree that the 5 disposers shall have power to compel him either to choose two men himselfe, or else to take them, two that the 5 disposers shall chuse, and if of these foure chosen by every partie two and the 5 disposers the major part of the 7 shall end the matter; be it. But if these foure men doe not end the matter, then for the 5 disposers to lay hold of and cause the partie or 2 disputers to choose 3 men to put the matter to, and the 3 men to choose 2 men more to put the matter to, and the 5 disputers to choose the 3 men, and the major part of the 5 men to end the matter; and both parties to sit down by a note under therie hand to performe it, and the partie not agreeing in the first to pay the charge of the last, and for the Arbitrators to follow no imployment till they have ended consent of the whole, that is to say to with the cause.

Instance. In the first Arbitration the offender may offer reasonable terms of peace, and the offended may exact upon him and refuse and trouble men beyond reasonable satisfaction; so for the last arbitration to judge where the fault was, in not aggreeing in the first, to pay the charge of the last.

Instance. Thus, if any person damnify any man, either in goods or good name, and the person offended follow not the cause vpon the offender, that if any person give notice to the 5 Disposers, they shall call the party delinquent to answer by Arbitration.

Instance. Thus, if any person abuse an other in person or goods, may be for peace sake, a space of time be given for to end the cause by private arbitration; but if in that time, it be not ended, then to give notice to the 5 Disposers, a remedy may be had.

IV. Agreed, for all the whole Inhabitants to combine ourselves to assist any man in the pursuit of any party delinquent, with all our best endeavours to attack him: but if any man raise a hubbub, and there be no just cause, then for the party that raised the hubbub to satisfy men for their time lost in it.

VI. Agreed, that if any man have a difference with any of the 5 Disposers which cannot be deferred till general meeting of the towne, then he may have the Clerk call the towne together at his discretion for a tryall.

Instance. It may be, a man may be to depart the land, or to a far parts of the land; or his estate may by upon a speedy tryall or the case may fall out.

VII. Agreed, that the towne, by the five men shall give every man a deed of all his lands lying within the bounds of the Plantation, to hold it by for after ages.

VIII. Agreed, that the 5 disposers shall from the date hereof, meete every month-day vppon General things and at the quarter-day to yield a new choice and give vp their old Accounts.

IX. Agreed, that the Clerke call the 5 Disposers together at the month-day, and the generall towne together every quarter, to meete vpon general occasions from the date hereof.

X. Agreed, that the Clerke is to receive for every cause that comes to the towne for a tryall 12d. and for each deed 12d. and to give in the booke to the towne at the yeare's end, and yield to a new choice.

XI. Agreed, that all acts of disposall on both sides to stand since the difference.

XII. Agreed, that every man that hath not paid in his purchase money for his Plantation shall make up his 10s. to be 30s. equal with the first purchases; and for all that are received townsmen hereafter, to pay the like summe of money to the towne stocke.

These being those things wee have generally concluded on, for our peace, wee desiring our loveing friends to receive as our absolute determination, laying ourselves downe as subjects to it.

Chad Brown
Robert Coles
William Harris
John Throckmorton
Stukely Westcott
Benedict Arnold
William Carpenter
Richard Scott
Thomas Harris
Francis Wickes X his mark
Thomas Angell X his mark
Adam Goodwin X his mark
William Burrows X his mark
Roger Williams
Robert West
Joshua Winsor
Robert Williams
Mathew Waller
Gregory Dexter
John Lippitt X his mark

John Warner
John Field
William Arnold
William Field
Edward Cope
Edward Manton X his mark
William Man
Nicholas Power
William Reynolds X his mark
Thomas Olney
Richard Waterman
William Wickenden
Edward Hart
Hugh Bewit
Thomas Hopkins X his mark
Joan Tiler (widow)
Jane Sears X her mark (widow)
Christopher Unthank
William Hawkins X his mark

== See also ==
- Colony of Rhode Island and Providence Plantations
- History of Rhode Island
- Freedom of religion in the United States
- Women's suffrage in the United States

== Bibliography ==
- Arnold, Samuel Greene (1859). History of the State of Rhode Island and Providence Plantations. Vol. I. New York: D. Appleton & Company.
- Bartlett, John Russell (1856). yes (ed.). Records of the Colony of Rhode Island and Providence Plantations in New England (PDF). Vol. 1. Providence: A. Crawford Greene and Brother.
- Bartlett, John Russell (1874). yes (ed.). Letters of Roger Williams, 1632–1682: Now First Collected. Providence: Printed for the Narragansett Club.
- Berlin, Isaiah (2002) [1969]. "Two Concepts of Liberty". In Hardy, Henry (ed.). Liberty. Oxford: Oxford University Press. pp. 166–217.
- Bicknell, Thomas Williams (1920). The History of the State of Rhode Island and Providence Plantations. New York: American Historical Society.
- Bragdon, Kathleen J. (1996). Native People of Southern New England, 1500-1650. Norman: University of Oklahoma Press.
- Cantwell v. Connecticut, 310 U.S. 296 (1940).
- Centner, Daniel; Ford, Megan (2020). "A Brief Primer on The History Of Arbitration". American Bar Association, Tort Trial & Insurance Practice Section: 5.
- Christman, John (1991). "Liberalism and Individual Positive Freedom". Ethics. 101 (2): 343–359.
- Conley, Patrick T. (1977). Democracy in Decline: Rhode Island's Constitutional Development 1776-1841. Providence: Rhode Island Historical Society.
- "First Amendment". Legal Information Institute. Cornell Law School.
- Easton, Emily (1930). Roger Williams: Prophet and Pioneer. Boston: Houghton Mifflin.
- Eberle, Edward J. (2004). "Another of Roger Williams's Gifts: Women's Right to Liberty of Conscience: Joshua Verin v. Providence Plantations". Roger Williams University Law Review. 9 (2): 399–424.
- Ellis, Charles Mayo (1847). The History of Roxbury Town. Boston: Samuel G. Drake.
- Field, Edward (1902). State of Rhode Island and Providence Plantations at the End of the Century. Providence: Mason Publishing Company.
- Hudgens v. NLRB, 424 U.S. 507 (1976).
- "Incorporation of the First Amendment". First Amendment Encyclopedia. Middle Tennessee State University.
- Keary, Anne (1996). "Retelling the History of the Settlement of Providence: Speech, Writing, and Cultural Interaction on Narragansett Bay". The New England Quarterly. 69 (2): 250–286.
- Lutz, Donald S. (1998). Colonial origins of the American Constitution: a documentary history. Indianapolis: Liberty Fund.
- Massachusetts Historical Society (1848). Collections of the Massachusetts Historical Society. Vol. Fourth Series, Vol. VI. Boston: Massachusetts Historical Society.
- Plane, Ann Marie (2000). Colonial Intimacies: Indian Marriage in Early New England. Ithaca: Cornell University Press.
- RIHS Reference Desk (19 May 2025). "Re: Manuscript Appointment" (Email). Robinson Research Center. "Email from reference@rihs.org confirming manuscript identifiers and providing reference images, sent 19 May 2025 at 9:54 AM EDT"
- Salisbury, Neal (1997). "Introduction". The Sovereignty and Goodness of God by Mary Rowlandson. Boston: Bedford Books. pp. 11–12.
- TimeandDate.com (2025). "The Julian Calendar". TimeandDate.com.
- Williams, Roger (1643). A Key into the Language of America. London: Gregory Dexter.
- Williams, Roger (1644). The Bloudy Tenent of Persecution, for Cause of Conscience (PDF). London.
