= John Throckmorton (settler) =

Proprietor of Providence, Rhode Island, US

- Born: baptised 9 May 1601; Norwich, Norfolk, England
- Died: April 1684; Middletown, New Jersey
- Resting place: Middletown, New Jersey
- Education: Sufficient to write letters and be a scrivener's apprentice
- Occupations: Merchant and Ship-owner
- Spouse: Rebecca Farrand
- Children: Hannah, Freegift, Patience, John, Deliverance, Job, and Joseph
- Parent(s): Bassingburn Throckmorton and Mary Hill

John Throckmorton, Gent. (1601–1684) was an early settler of Providence Plantation in what became the Colony of Rhode Island and Providence Plantations, and he was one of the 12 original proprietors of that settlement. He emigrated from Norfolk, England to settle in Salem in the Massachusetts Bay Colony, but religious tensions brought about his removal to Providence.

In 1643, Throckmorton made a land purchase in New Netherland and settled there with several dozen others. However, an Indian attack during Kieft's War caused him and others to return to Providence. He became active in civil affairs, serving as moderator, deputy, and treasurer. He died in 1684 in Middletown, New Jersey, where he went to visit his children, and was buried there. Throggs Neck in The Bronx, New York City is named for him.

== Life ==
John Throckmorton was almost certainly baptised in Norwich, county Norfolk, England on 9 May 1601, the son of grocer and Alderman Bassingburn Throckmorton. On 20 March 1621, he was apprenticed to a scrivener, but his whereabouts by 1638 had become unknown to his father, and the executors of his father's estate in 1640 could not find him. Several writers suggest that he was the "George Throckmorton" who arrived in New England aboard the Lyon and was made a freeman in May 1631. In 1995, Robert Charles Anderson argued that this was highly unlikely because a person of his stature would not be absent from the colonial records from 1631 to 1638, suggesting that George Throckmorton either died soon after his arrival or else returned to England, and John Throckmorton did not arrive in the colonies until closer to 1638. Twenty years later, however, Anderson had evidently changed his view, stating that John Throckmorton of Salem and Providence was in fact the 1631 passenger on the Lyon and listing his own 1995 remarks as "incorrect."

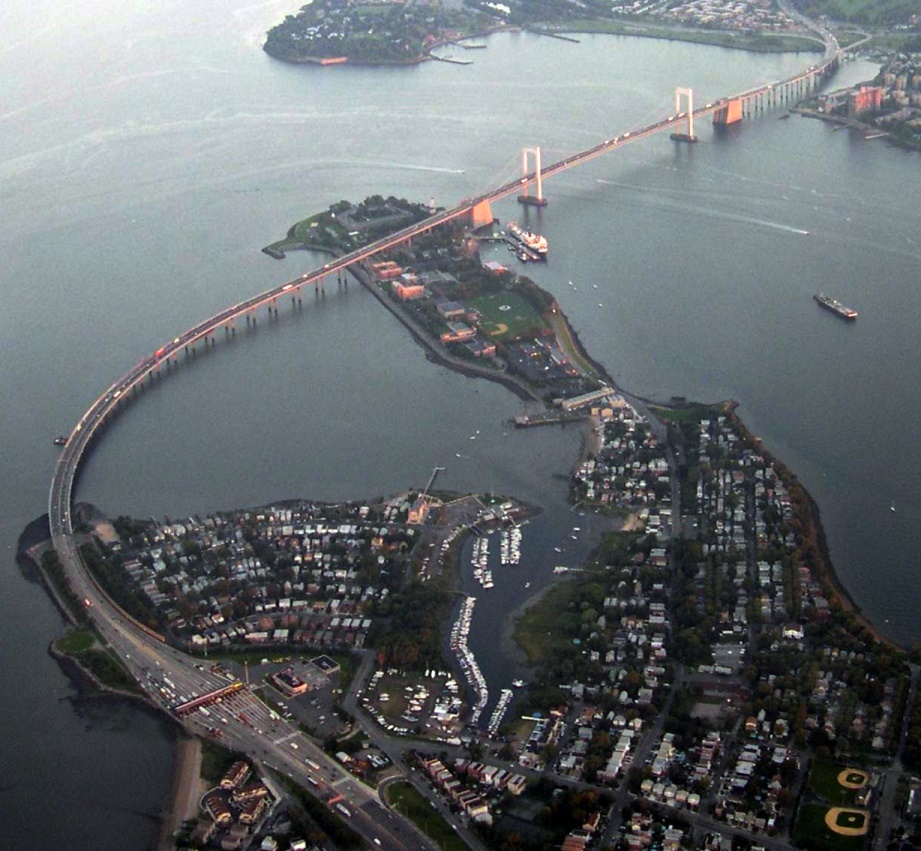
Throggs Neck in New York City is named for Throckmorton

Throckmorton may have been in Salem in the Massachusetts Bay Colony as early as 1635, but the first definitive record of his presence in New England is in 1638 when he was one of the 12 original proprietors of Providence Plantation, being named in the deed signed by Roger Williams in October of that year. Nevertheless, it is certain that he was in Salem at some point because the Reverend Hugh Peters of Salem alluded to him and his wife in July 1639 as having "the great censure passed upon them in this our church." Rev. Peters also complained that they and certain others "wholly refused to hear the church, denying it and all the churches in the Bay to be true churches."

On 27 July 1640, Throckmorton was one of 39 settlers who signed an agreement for a form of government in Providence. Three years later, he obtained a grant of land for himself and 35 others from Governor Willem Kieft in New Netherland. The land was named after him and is called Throggs Neck, now a part of The Bronx in New York City. Other nearby English settlers included Thomas Cornell and Anne Hutchinson, who may have purchased her land from Throckmorton. The settlement was short-lived, however, and its fate was summed up by Massachusetts Bay Colony Governor John Winthrop in September 1643, who said that the Indians set upon the English who dwelt under the Dutch and killed "such of Mr. Throckmorton's and Mr. Cornhill's families as were at home." He further added that these settlers "had cast off ordinances and churches, and now at last their own people, and for larger accommodation had subjected themselves to the Dutch, and dwelt scatteringly near a mile assunder."

Some of those who escaped the Indian attack returned to Providence. Throckmorton was in Providence on 27 February 1647 when he was granted a house and land once belonging to Edward Cope. Soon he became active in civil affairs; he was a Providence Moderator in 1652 and from 1664 to 1675, and he served for eight years as Deputy to the General Assembly. He was also on the Providence Town Council in 1667, and ten years later he was the town treasurer. In July 1672, Throckmorton wrote one of three letters to Roger Williams critical of Williams' unfavorable opinions of the Quakers.

Throckmorton died in March or April 1684 in Middletown, New Jersey where he had gone to visit his children, and he was also buried there. He had owned land in Middletown but never resided there permanently.

== Family ==
Gary Boyd Roberts has published a genealogy of John Throckmorton, showing him to be descended in the 15th generation from King Edward I of England and his wife Eleanor of Castile. Throckmorton's wife was named Rebecca Farrand, and the couple had six known children, the oldest named Freegift, a son who died unmarried in Jamaica by 1669. John married a daughter of Richard and Penelope Stout of Gravesend, New York, and resided in Monmouth County, New Jersey. Daughter Deliverance married Reverend James Ashton of Middletown, New Jersey, had seven known children, and was widowed by 1705. Job was born about 1651 and became a Deputy in Middletown; his estate was administered by his widow Sarah in 1711. Joseph was a mariner and landowner, who died unmarried on a voyage to Barbados in 1690. Patience married John Coggeshall and died in 1676.

Throckmorton descends from nine of the twenty-five Magna Carta Surety Barons: William d'Aubigny, Lord of Belvoir Castle; Hugh Bigod, heir to the earldoms of Norfolk and Suffolk; Roger Bigod, Earl of Norfolk and Suffolk; Gilbert de Clare, heir to the earldom of Hertford; Richard de Clare, Earl of Hertford; John de Lacy, Lord of Pontefract Castle; Saer de Quincy, 1st Earl of Winchester; Robert de Ros (died 1227), Lord of Hamlake Castle; and Robert de Vere, heir to the earldom of Oxford.

Notable descendants of Throckmorton include Susan B. Anthony; Ellen Louise (Axson) Wilson, first lady of U.S. President Woodrow Wilson; Confederate General James Longstreet; Marilyn Monroe; Benedict Arnold; and Richard Scudder, co-founder of the MediaNews Group, the second-largest newspaper company in the U.S.

== See also ==
- List of early settlers of Rhode Island
- Colony of Rhode Island and Providence Plantations
