= Chad Brown (minister) =

English settler and Baptist minister (1600–1650)

- Born: c. 1600; High Wycombe, Buckinghamshire, England
- Died: c. 1650 (aged 49–50); Providence, Rhode Island, English America
- Occupation: Baptist minister

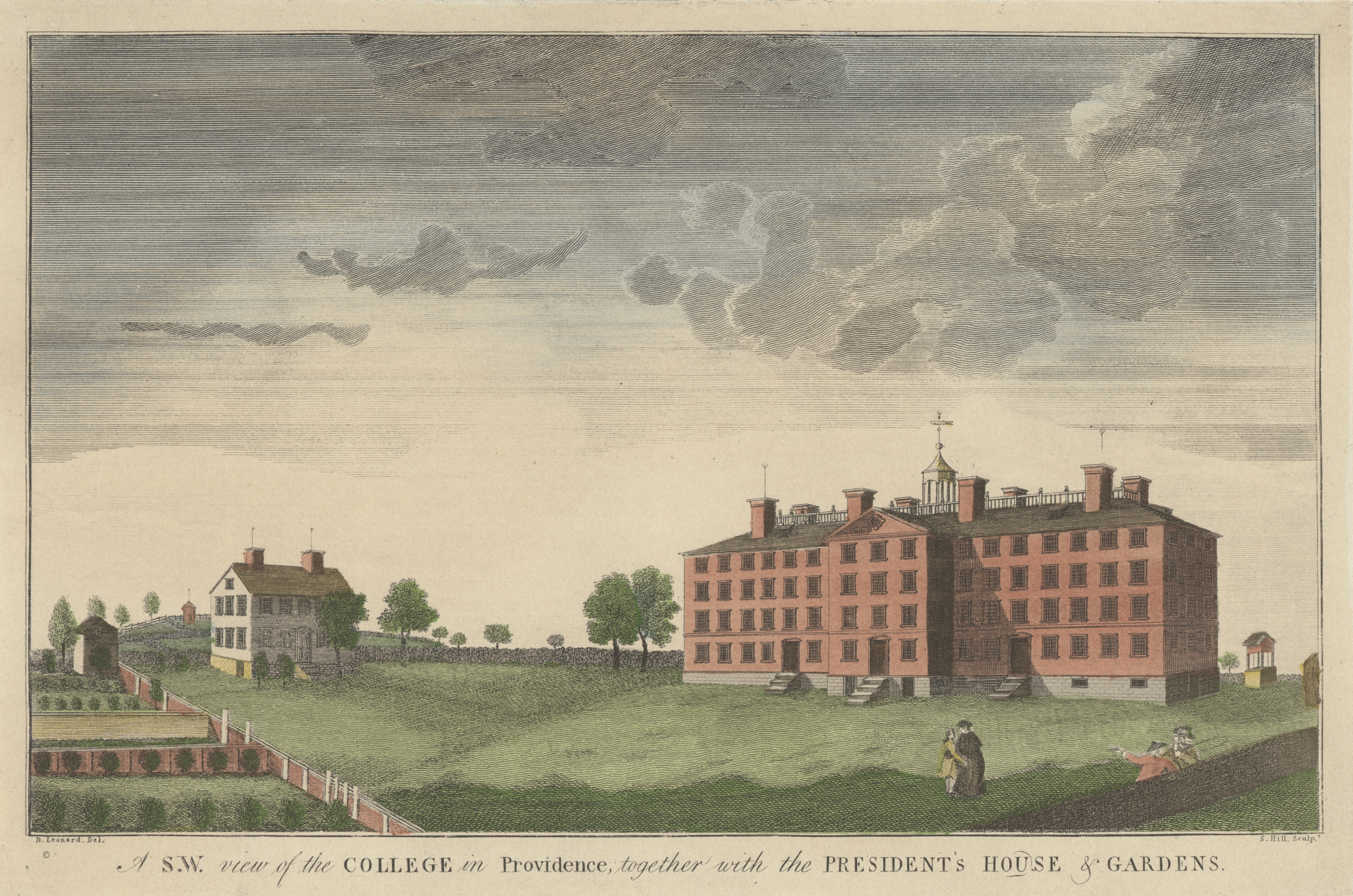
Chad Brown's original plot of farm land was located on the site of what became Brown University's University Hall

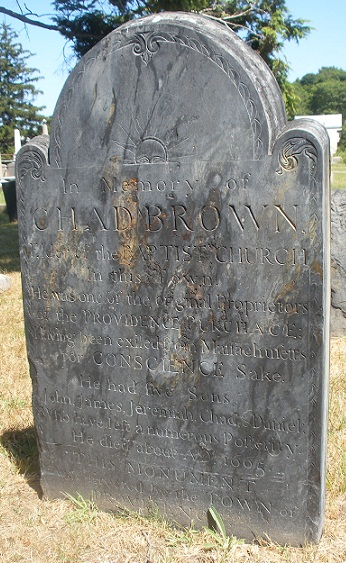
Chad Brown grave marker, North Burial Ground, Providence

Reverend Chad Brown I (also known as Chaddus Browne) (c. 1600 – c. 1650) was one of the first ministers of the First Baptist Church in America and one of the earliest proprietors of Providence Plantations. He was also the progenitor of the Brown family of Rhode Island, known for its association with Brown University.

== Settlement in Providence ==
Chad Brown was born in Wycombe, Buckinghamshire, England, and married Elizabeth Sharparowe on September 11, 1626, in High Wycombe, Buckinghamshire, England. He emigrated to New England on the ship Martin with Elizabeth and their son John. The family arrived in Boston in the Massachusetts Bay Colony in July 1638. He soon moved to Providence Plantations which was recently purchased by Roger Williams from the Narragansetts.

Sometime between 1639 and 1644, Brown and 12 others signed an agreement sometimes called the Providence Compact, an agreement of "second comers" as distinguished from the original proprietors. He was also one of 39 who signed an agreement for a government in Providence in 1640.

Brown became known as an arbitrator of disputes in the settlement, and he was also the town's initial surveyor. He owned a lot on "Towne Streete" (now South Main street and Market Square) along with the land where University Hall now stands at Brown University. The site was chosen by his descendants to establish the university in Providence on College Hill. Brown also served on a committee determining the governance of the settlement while Roger Williams was in England from 1643 to 1644 gaining an official charter.

== Children ==
His children were:

- John Brown I, born on March 9, 1627, England; d. September 13, 1677; m. Mary Holmes in 1643.
- Daniel Brown I, b. about 1645; d. 29 September 1710; m. Alice Hearndon.
- Phebe Brown, b. British Colonies; m. (1) Thomas Lee; m. (2) Greenfield Larrabee.
- James Brown I - b. British Colonies; d. 1683; m. Elizabeth Carr. Rhode Island's Brown University is named for Nicholas Brown, Jr., a descendant of Chad and Elizabeth Brown through James Brown II and his son Nicholas Brown, Sr.
- Jeremiah Brown I, b. British Colonies; d. 1690; m. (1) Mary Gardner; m. (2) Mary Cook
- Judah Brown
- Chad Brown II, d. May 10, 1663.
- Mary, d. May 10, 1643.
- Debrah, d. May 10, 1645.

== Pastorship of First Baptist Church ==
In 1639, Rev. Chad Brown assumed the leadership of the First Baptist Church in America, which had been briefly pastored by Roger Williams. During Brown's pastorship, the church worshipped in a grove or orchard and in the houses of its members, and he remained pastor until his death sometime before 1650. His remains were initially interred near the corner of College and Benefit Streets, but they were moved in 1792 to the North Burial Ground. His wife was listed a widow in the September 1650 Tax List.
