= William Harris (settler) =

American lawyer

- Born: baptized December 9, 1610; Northbourne, Kent, England
- Died: 1681; London, England
- Education: Sufficient to write books and volumes of material concerning his legal pursuits
- Occupation: Attorney
- Spouse: Susannah Hyde
- Children: Andrew, Mary, Susannah, Howlong, Toleration
- Parent(s): Andrew Harris and Jane Bagley

William Harris (1610-1681) was one of the four men with Roger Williams at Seekonk in the Plymouth Colony during the winter of 1636. He then joined Williams and several families in establishing the settlement of Providence Plantations which became a part of the Colony of Rhode Island and Providence Plantations. He became one of the 12 original proprietors of Providence, and one of the 12 original members of the first Baptist Church in America, and he appears prominently in the early records of the settlement.

Harris had a very keen mind for business, and he knew legal methods and principles better than any other man in Providence; he also had very liberal views concerning freedom of conscience which put him in deep conflict with Williams. Williams was President of the colony in 1657, and he issued a warrant for Harris's arrest with the charge of high treason against the Commonwealth of England. At the ensuing trial, the court decided that the matter must be sent to England for resolution, with Harris being placed under bond. Ultimately, the ruling was in his favor.

Harris was very active in town and colonial affairs from 1660 to 1676—simultaneously acting as agent or representative for interests that were inimical to the interests of the colony. He became an agent on behalf of the Pawtuxet settlers in some complex land disputes, and made several trips to England on their behalf. He was successful in winning his cases, but the results were never realized, and disputes continued following his death. On his last trip to England in 1680, he once again represented the Pawtuxet settlers, but he also became an agent for Connecticut Colony in its claims for the Narragansett lands situated within the boundaries of Rhode Island—very much at odds with Rhode Island interests. During this trip, his ship was seized by an Algerian corsair and he became a slave along the Barbary Coast, being released more than a year later after a very high ransom had been paid on his behalf. He then made his way back to London where he died three days after his arrival.

== Early life ==
Harris was baptized in Northbourne, Kent, England on December 9, 1610, the fourth of five children born to Andrew Harris and Jane Bagley of Northbourne. He was a young child when his father died in 1616, after which his mother married James Grigges, who also died soon, and then she married James Sayer. He began a seven-year apprenticeship as a needle-maker to Thomas Wilson, a member of the Drapers' Company of Eastcheap, London on October 22, 1628, when he was almost 18.

Harris was a member of Reverend John Lothrop's Church in London with his brother Thomas and sister Jane, who appears on a 1632 church roster. The three Harris siblings are listed in a church record as being among those "added to the church" at the time when John Lothrop was imprisoned, along with 42 fellow dissenters. In about 1634, Harris married Susan Hyde, the daughter of John Hyde (a member of the Drapers' Company to which Harris had been apprenticed) and Mary Bonfoy. Harris probably left England in 1635, but certainly by early 1636, and he might have come first to Salem in the Massachusetts Bay Colony.

== Settling Providence ==
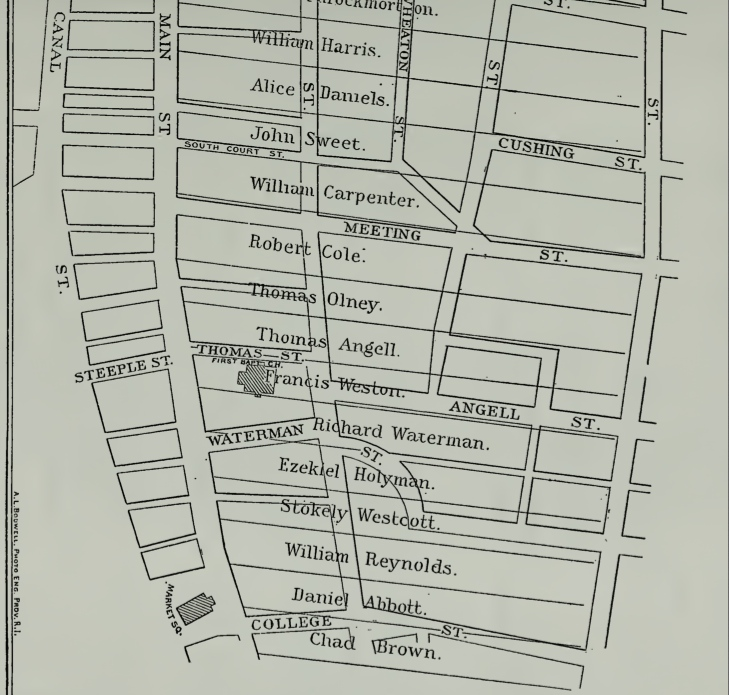
Harris lot in Providence overlaid on contemporary map

Roger Williams spent part of the winter of 1636 in Seekonk in the Plymouth Colony after he was forced to leave Salem in the Massachusetts Bay Colony, and four other men accompanied him, including Harris. Later, the families of some of these men and others joined him in crossing the river to establish Providence Plantations. Traveling with Harris were his wife Susannah and his infant son Andrew. Williams wrote in 1677 that he "desired not to be troubled with English company, yet out of pity I gave leave to William Harris, then poor and destitute, to come along in my company."

In 1638, Harris was one of the 12 original proprietors of Providence whom Williams included in a deed to the land originally obtained from Indian sachems Canonicus and Miantonomi. The following year, Harris became one of the 12 founding members of the first Baptist Church in America, and he and 38 others signed an agreement in 1640 to establish a government in Providence. By 1638, a group of the Providence settlers were living along the Pawtuxet River, led by William Arnold, when they began having tensions with other Providence settlers. In 1640, Harris was on a committee with three others to consider the differences between the disputing parties and to come up with an amicable solution. Matters grew worse, to the point that the Pawtuxet settlers ultimately put themselves under the jurisdiction of Massachusetts Bay Colony for 16 years before re-uniting with the Providence government.

=== Clash with Roger Williams ===
Over the next ten years, Harris was able to accumulate a fair amount of land, and he was assessed in a 1650 tax list more than one pound in taxes, one of the higher amounts in the colony. In 1655, he appears in the Providence section of a list of freemen of the colony. Sometime in the mid-1650s, "an inveterate hostility arose" between Harris and Roger Williams. The source of this discord appears to have been their different views on the nature of liberty. Historian Samuel G. Arnold wrote that the hostility "was carried to a degree of personal invective that mars the exalted character of Williams and detracts from the dignity and worth of his opponent. It was never forgotten by the one or forgiven by the other."

Harris was almost constantly employed in undertakings that clashed with the interests of Rhode Island, and he took on a position that the Arnolds of Pawtuxet previously held, either as a factional leader within the state or the agent and representative of interests abroad. Historian Samuel Arnold thought this regrettable because "he brought to whatever he undertook the resources of a great mind and, to all appearances, the honest convictions of an earnest soul."

Harris had published the notion that one following his conscience should not have to yield to "any human order amongst men," a position which Williams called "unbounded license for individuals." On March 12, 1657, Williams was President of the colony and issued a warrant for Harris' arrest on the charge of high treason against the Commonwealth of England. The warrant charged Harris with having published "dangerous writings containing his notorious defiance to the authority of his highness the Lord Protector," and inciting the people into a "traitorous renouncing of their allegiance." The trial of Harris took place at a special session of the General Court in Warwick, where he read a copy of his book while Williams read the original. Williams also read to the court copies of his accusation against Harris and his charges. A few months later, the General Court concluded that Harris' behavior was "both contemptuous and seditious," but nevertheless decided that it was best to send the case to England where judgment could be made, and in the meantime to bind Harris with a bond contingent upon his good behavior. Harris was ultimately absolved of any wrongdoing.

=== Colonial leader ===
Harris was active in the affairs of Providence over a period of 16 years—from 1660, when he became a commissioner, to 1676. He served as Deputy for two terms, and as Assistant (magistrate) for seven terms. He was also General Solicitor for a year, and on the Providence Town Council for seven years. In 1667, he was discharged from his office as Assistant based on "many grievous complaints against him." He was fined 50 pounds, but some Assistants protested the action against him, particularly William Carpenter and Benjamin Smith, and the fine was eventually remitted.

=== Agent for Pawtuxet interests ===
In 1663, Harris made a trip to England on business involving the lands at Pawtuxet. Land disputes had been ongoing concerning Pawtuxet settlers William Arnold, William Carpenter, and Robert Coles, and Harris became their agent. In 1675, he once again made a trip to England as agent for the Pawtuxet proprietors, with the intent of laying the case before the King, and then he made a final trip to England for the same business in 1679. In addition, he was also hired by the Connecticut Colony as their agent to support their claims to the Narragansett country.

Harris was apparently successful in his claims against the Town of Providence, as alluded to by Governor John Cranston in a January 1680 letter to King Charles II. Nevertheless, the question of jurisdiction and title to the Pawtuxet lands was not ultimately settled until many years after Harris's death.

On 25 December 1679, Harris set sail on a vessel to return to England to represent Connecticut in its claims for the Narraganset Territory. On 24 January 1680, the ship was commandeered by an Algerian corsair, and Harris was taken to Algiers. He wrote in a letter while in captivity that he was sold into slavery on the Barbary Coast on 23 February and imprisoned for over a month. Though kept captive, he was able to write several letters home and to Connecticut from Algiers in April and May, but it wasn't until June 1680 that Connecticut first became aware of his enslavement. He continued to write letters through July and August, requesting that about 300 pounds in ransom money be raised and sent, and Connecticut ordered that the requested sum be raised on 14 October 1680. More than 18 months had transpired from his time of capture when an agent informed Mrs. Harris on 2 August 1681 that her husband had been successfully ransomed. Harris was able to cross the Mediterranean Sea and traverse Spain and France to get back to London. He died three days after his arrival at the house of his London landlord John Stokes, though the exact date is unknown. It was on 3 December 1681 that an agent informed his wife of his death. The inventory of his estate took place the next month, and in February 1682 his will was approved by the Providence Council.

== Family ==
William Harris had four siblings, at least three of whom emigrated to New England. His oldest sibling Jane was baptized in Northbourne, England on 23 December 1604, and she was admitted to the church at Scituate, Massachusetts on 21 June 1635 as "Jane Harrice". Nothing more has been found about her in New England. The next oldest sibling Parnell was baptized at Northbourne on 3 August 1606, and her name appears on a March 1635 passenger list for the Hercules out of Sandwich, Kent with John Witherly as the master. Passengers were required to obtain certificates for their travel, and she had obtained hers on 19 March, signed by Jos Leech, the vicar of Bow Parish in London. The name just below hers on the ship passenger roster is that of James Sayers of Northbourne, her stepbrother. Parnell married Thomas Roberts of Providence, and both she and her husband died in 1676 after fleeing to Aquidneck Island following the devastation of Providence during King Phillips War. On 3 July 1676, William Harris petitioned the Newport Council for administration of Parnell's estate.

The next sibling of Harris was Ann, baptized 29 May 1608. She apparently lived well into adulthood, but no record has been found for her, other than being mentioned in the estate of William Harris: a quarter of the estate of Parnell Roberts belonged to William Harris "in the right of Anne Harris." William was the fourth of the Harris children, and the youngest was Thomas, baptized in Northbourne on 11 July 1613. Thomas was married to a woman named Elizabeth, likely in England about 1636, and was first of record in Providence on 20 August 1637. He held many positions in the Providence government including commissioner, lieutenant, juryman, and councilman, and died there on 7 June 1686.

William Harris and his wife Susannah had five known children. Their oldest son Andrew (1635-1686) married Mary Tew, the sister of Deputy Governor Henry Tew. Their daughter Mary (died 1718) married Thomas Borden, son of Richard and Joan Borden, and daughter Susannah married Ephraim Carpenter, the son of Pawtuxet settler William Carpenter. Their daughter Howlong (died 1708) married Arthur Fenner late in life as his second wife, who was ancestor of Rhode Island Governor Arthur Fenner by his first wife. Their son Toleration (1645-1675) was killed during King Phillips War. William Harris is a great-grandfather of Rhode Island deputy governor Elisha Brown.

== Legacy ==
Roger Williams had an antagonistic relationship with Harris and wrote this about him:

W. Harris, who, being an impudent morris-dancer in Kent... under a cloak of separation, got in with myself, till his self-ends and restless strife, and at last his atheistical denying of heaven and hell, made honest souls to fly from him. Now he courts the Baptists: then he kicks them off and flatters the Foxians [Quakers]; then the drunkards (which he calls all that are not of the former two amongst us); then knowing the prejudices of the other Colonies against us, he dares to abuse his Majesty and Council, to bring New England upon us.

Rhode Island historian Thomas W. Bicknell wrote a much more favorable commentary. "William Harris was one of the greatest of the founders of Providence, in many points superior to Roger Williams, but a very different type of man. Realism ruled his action, while Mr. Williams dreamed dreams. Harris had a legal mind and knew legal forms, methods, and principles, superior to any man in Providence."

=== See also ===
- List of early settlers of Rhode Island
- Colony of Rhode Island and Providence Plantations

=== References ===
==== Bibliography ====
- Anderson, Robert Charles (2003). The Great Migration, Immigrants to New England 1634–1635. Vol. III G-H. Boston: New England Historic Genealogical Society. ISBN 0-88082-158-2.
- Arnold, Elisha Stephen (1935). The Arnold Memorial: William Arnold of Providence and Pawtuxet, 1587–1675, and a genealogy of his descendants. Rutland, VT: Tuttle Publishing Company. OCLC 6882845.
- Arnold, Samuel Greene (1859). History of the State of Rhode Island and Providence Plantations. Vol. 1. New York: D. Appleton & Company. OCLC 712634101.
- Austin, John Osborne (1887). Genealogical Dictionary of Rhode Island. Albany, New York: J. Munsell's Sons. ISBN 978-0-8063-0006-1.
- Bicknell, Thomas Williams (1920). The History of the State of Rhode Island and Providence Plantations. Vol. 1. New York: The American Historical Society.
- Brigham, Clarence S. (1902), "Calendar of Events in the Life of William Harris", in Winship, George Parker (ed.), Collections of the Rhode Island Historical Society, Providence, pp. 24–45
- Chapin, Howard M. (1916). Documentary History of Rhode Island. Providence: Preston and Rounds Company. pp. 8–16.
- Ullmann, Helen Schatvet; Harris, L. Randall (April 2013). "The Origins of Thomas Harris and William Harris of Providence, Rhode Island". New England Historical and Genealogical Register. 167.

=== External links ===
- RI Historical Collections, vol. 10, devoted entirely to the William Harris papers
- Rhode Island History from the State of Rhode Island General Assembly website. See Chapter 2, Colonial Era.
