= St. Luke's Episcopal Church (East Hampton, New York) =

Episcopal parish church in East Hampton, New York

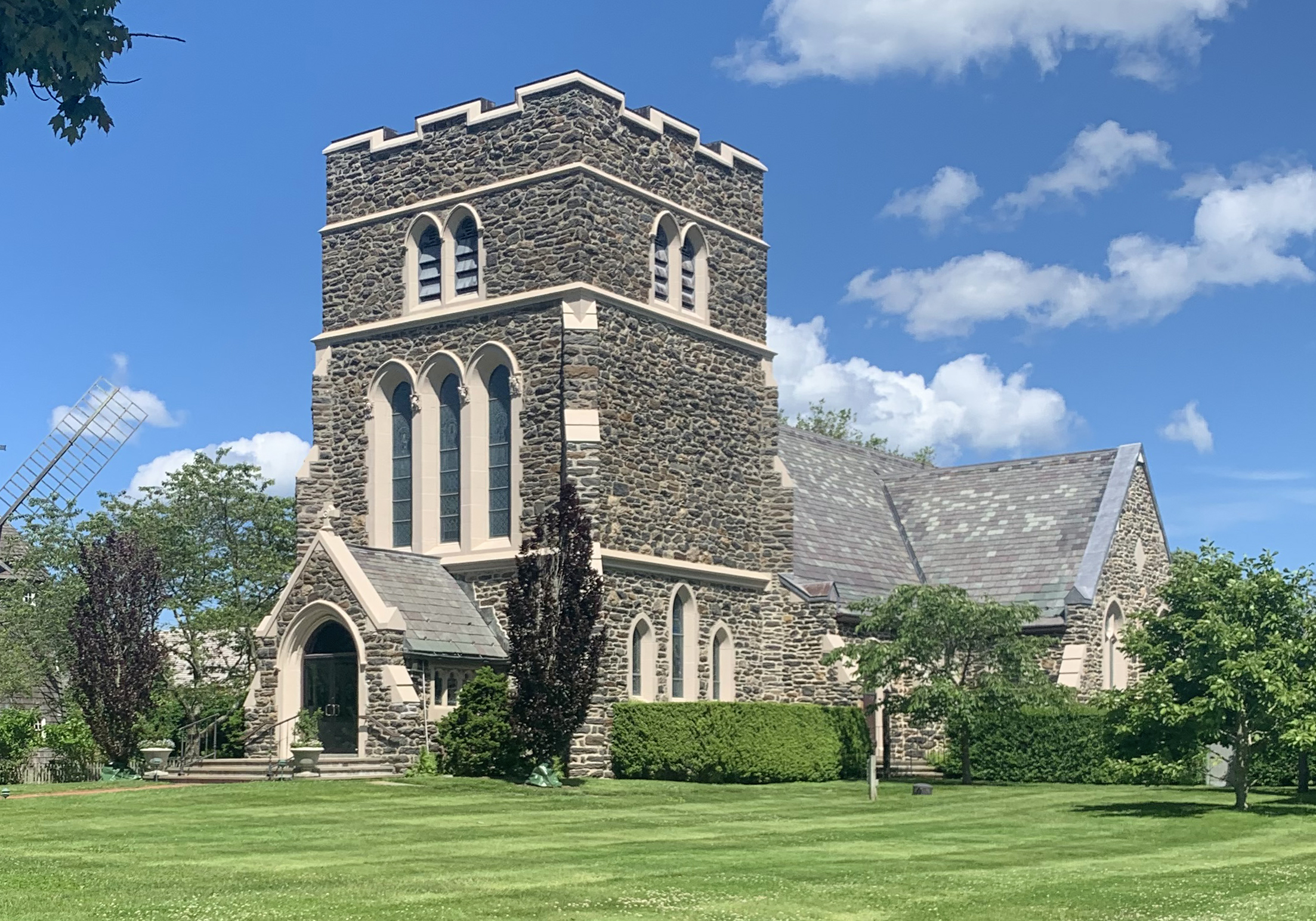
- Exterior, 2019
- St. Luke's Episcopal Church
- 40°57′23″N 72°11′28″W
- Location: East Hampton, New York, U.S.
- Country: United States
- Denomination: Episcopal Church
- Website: stlukeseasthampton.org

History
- Status: Parish church
- Founded: 1860

Architecture
- Functional status: Active
- Architectural type: Church
- Style: English Gothic Revival / Elizabethan Revival
- Years built: 1910–1911
- Completed: 1911

Specifications
- Materials: Stone (reported gneiss)

St. Luke's Episcopal Church is located in the village of East Hampton, Suffolk County, New York. Founded in 1860, the present stone church was designed by architect Thomas Nash and erected in 1910–1911. It stands within the East Hampton Village District listed on the National Register of Historic Places, where it is a contributing property alongside the rectory (1916).

== History ==
St. Luke's parish was organized in 1860. The present stone church was built in 1910–1911, followed by the rectory in 1916. The stained-glass windows were restored in 2021, and a new Parish House designed by Cooper Robertson opened in 2011.

The church also oversees St. Peter's Chapel in Springs, New York, where summer services are held.

== Architecture ==
The church, designed by architect Thomas Nash, is a stone building with a cruciform plan. Its east window was modeled on the Five Sisters window of York Minster, and the building has been compared to an English parish church in style and scale. The rectory, completed in 1916, was also designed by Nash in a Tudor Revival style. Local reports note that the stone came from excavations for the early New York City subway under the East River.

== Clergy ==
- Rector: The Rev. Ben Shambaugh (2023–present).

== See also ==
- East Hampton Village District
- Episcopal Diocese of Long Island
