= East Hampton Village District =

Historic district in New York, United States

- U.S. National Register of Historic Places
- U.S. Historic district
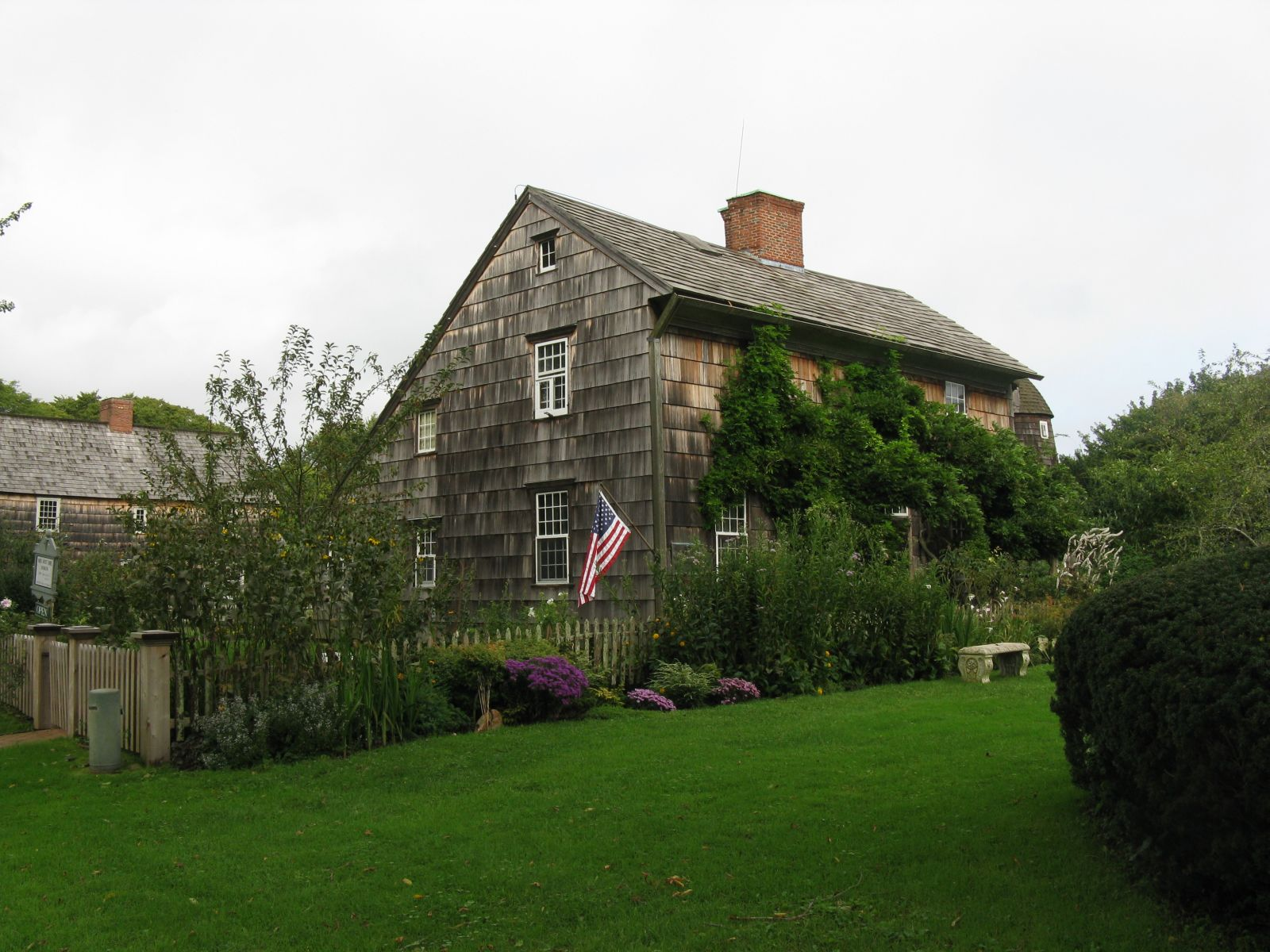
- "Home Sweet Home"

- Location within New York Location within the United States
- Location: Bounded by Main St. and James and Woods Lanes, (original); Northeastward along Main St. to Newton La. and Southwestward along Ocean and Lee Aves. and Pond La. to Hedges La., (increase), East Hampton, New York
- Coordinates: 40°57′17″N 72°11′28″W
- Architect: J.C. Thorp
- Architectural style: Late 19th And 20th Century Revivals, Bungalow/Craftsman, Late Victorian
- MPS: Village of East Hampton MRA
- NRHP reference No.: 74001309 (original); 88001032 (increase)
- Added to NRHP: May 2, 1974 (original); July 21, 1988 (increase)

East Hampton Village District is a historic district in East Hampton, New York.

It was listed on the National Register of Historic Places in 1974. Its boundaries were increased in 1988.

Contributing properties include what is known as the John Howard Payne House (a.k.a.; "Home Sweet Home") and the Thomas Moran House, a National Historic Landmark.

The Pantigo Windmill and the Gardiner mill, two of the east end's New England–style smock windmills, are also included.

Next to the 1926 flagpole on the village green is a large rock with a plaque installed on it, marking the historic district. The Green slopes up to the South End Cemetery, which was the site of the historic Town Church. It was a thatched roofed structure that was demolished. Near its former site is a memorial to Lion Gardiner, whose grave is 30 feet away. Historical markers about the Rev. Thomas James, first church minister are located on both James Lane and Pondview Lane. Further along is the town pond. This oval constitutes the original boundaries of the historic district.

It was expanded to include, on the other side of James Lane, Tuthill House, Mulford Farmhouse, Home Sweet Home (associated with writer John Howard Payne), St. Luke's Episcopal Church and Rectory, the replica of the John Lyon Gardiner Mill Cottage, Gardiner Mill, The Rev. Thomas James historical marker- first pastor of the town church, (1651-1698) and the Thomas Moran House. The trees on side of the street by Mulford homestead are all separately marked with a stone with a name/date shield.

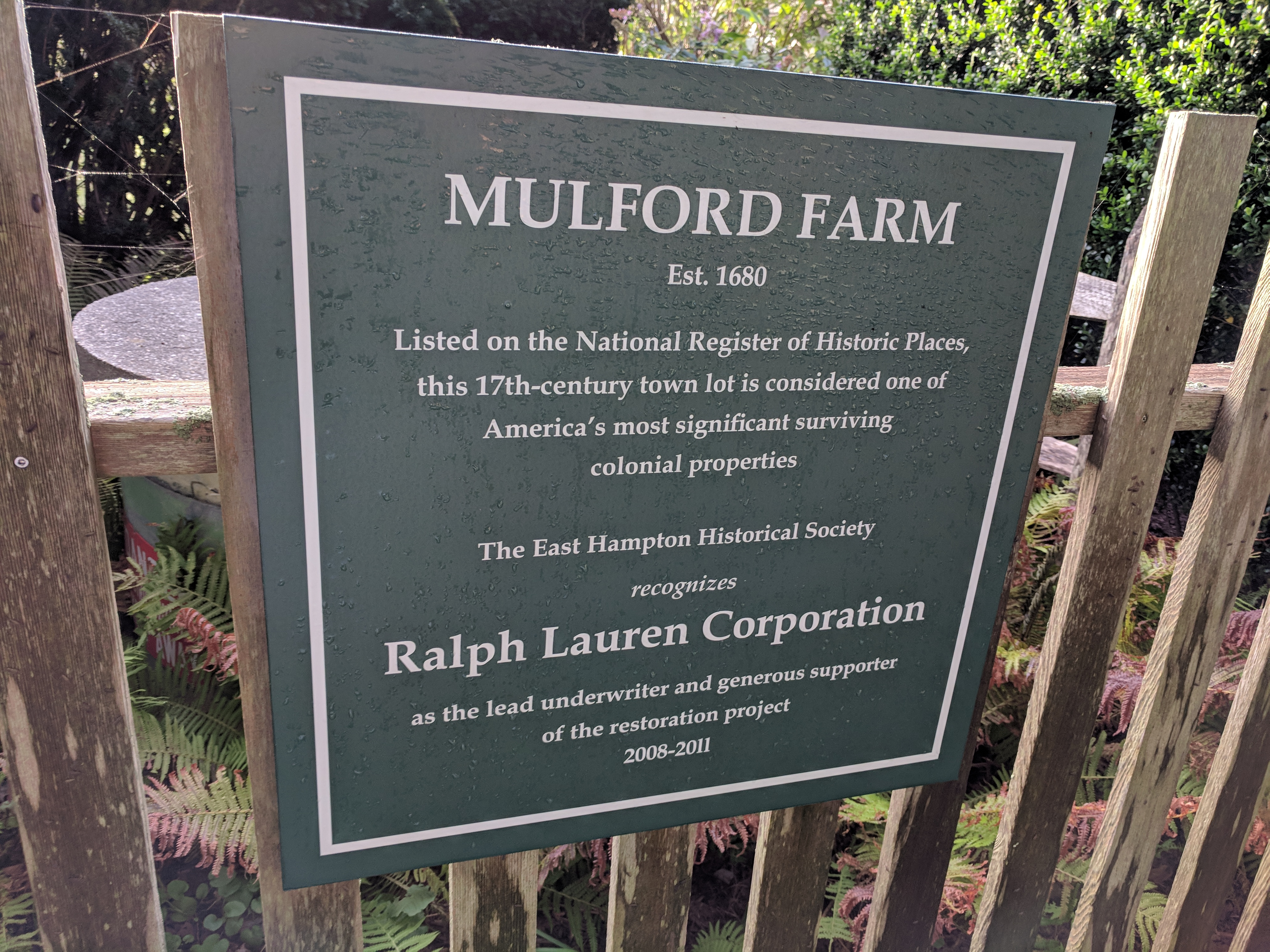
Mulford Farm in East Hampton

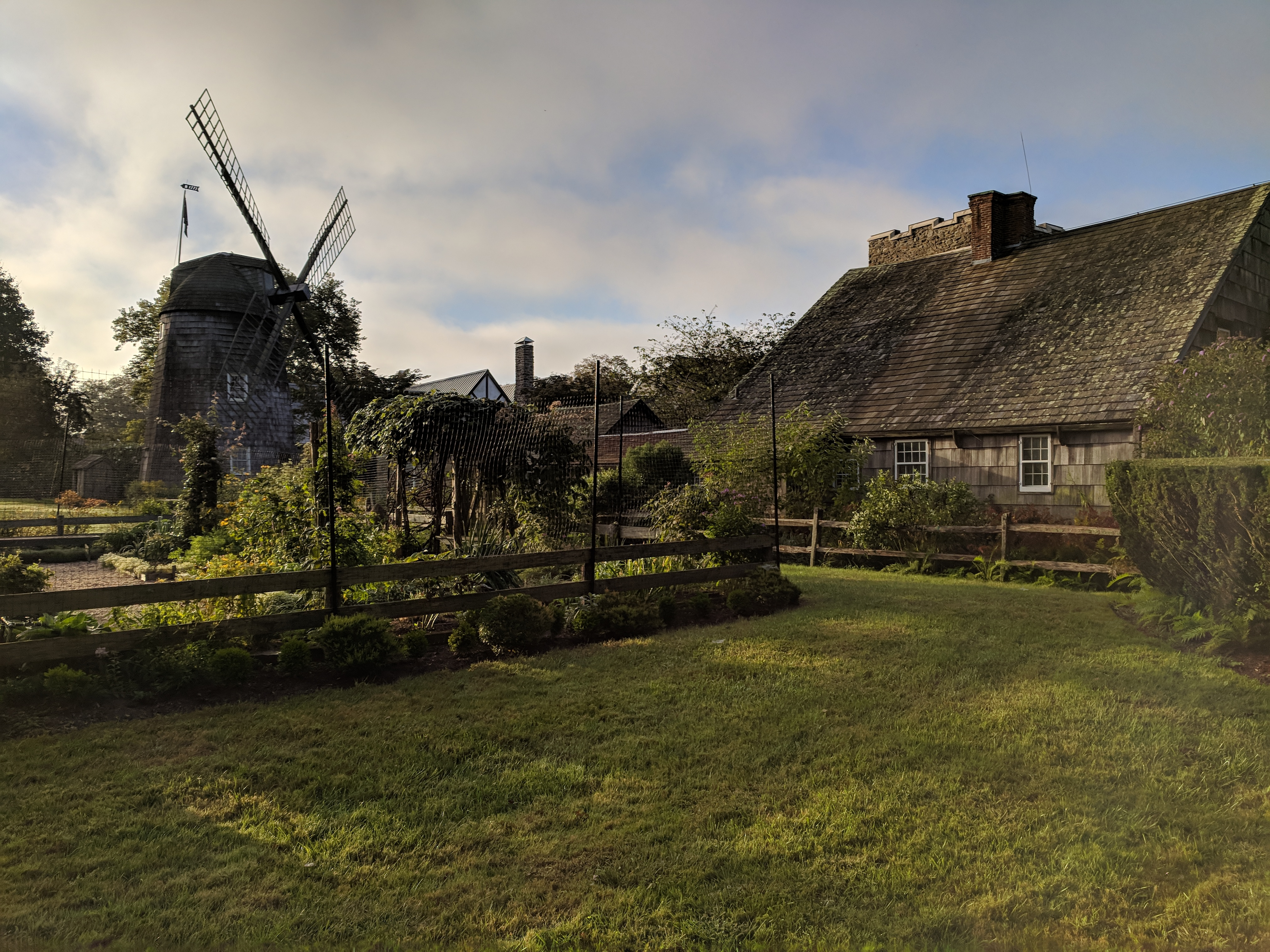
English colonial farmsteads; the Pantigo Windmill abuts the farm.

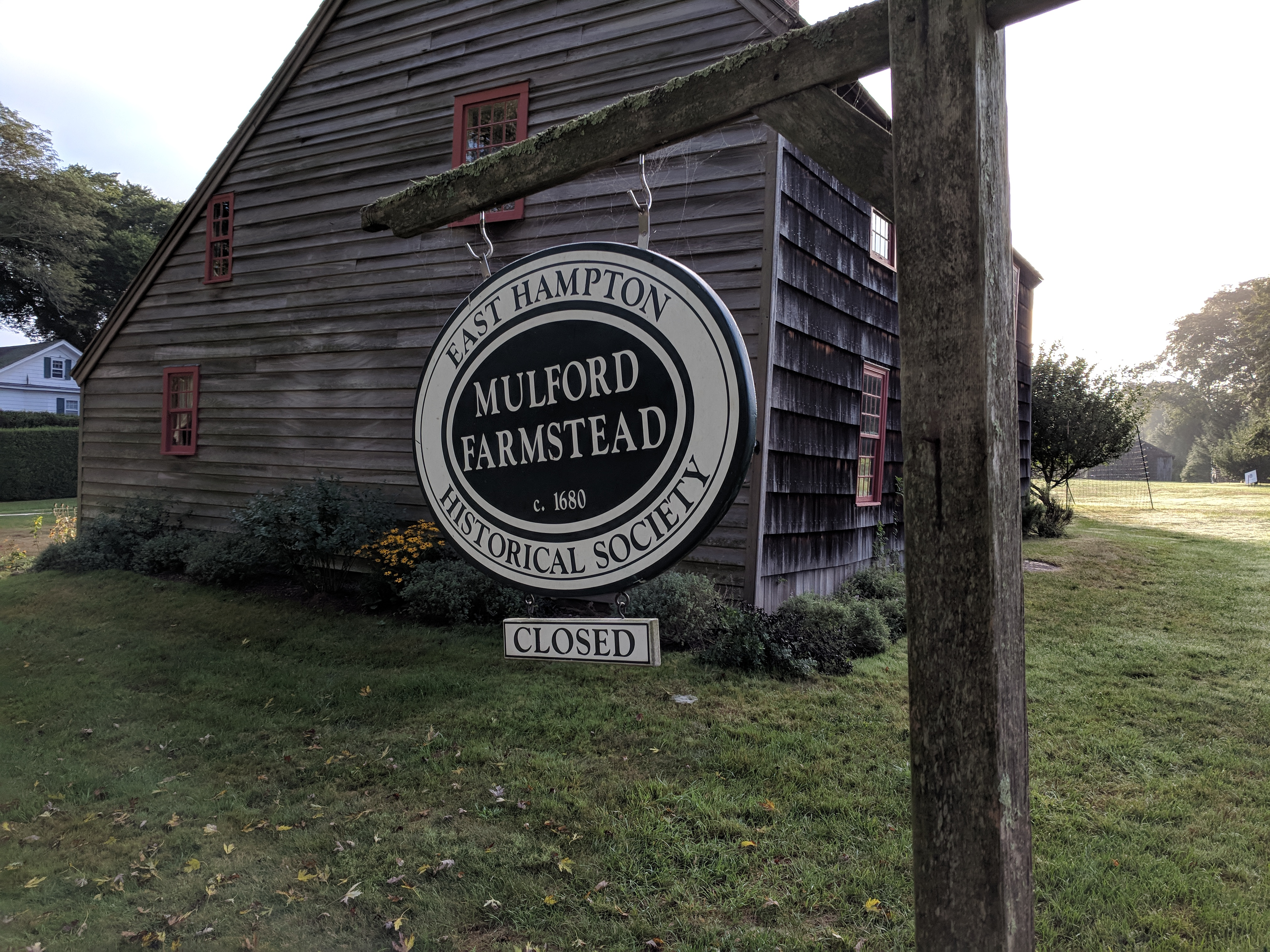
Mulford Farm colonial farmsteads.

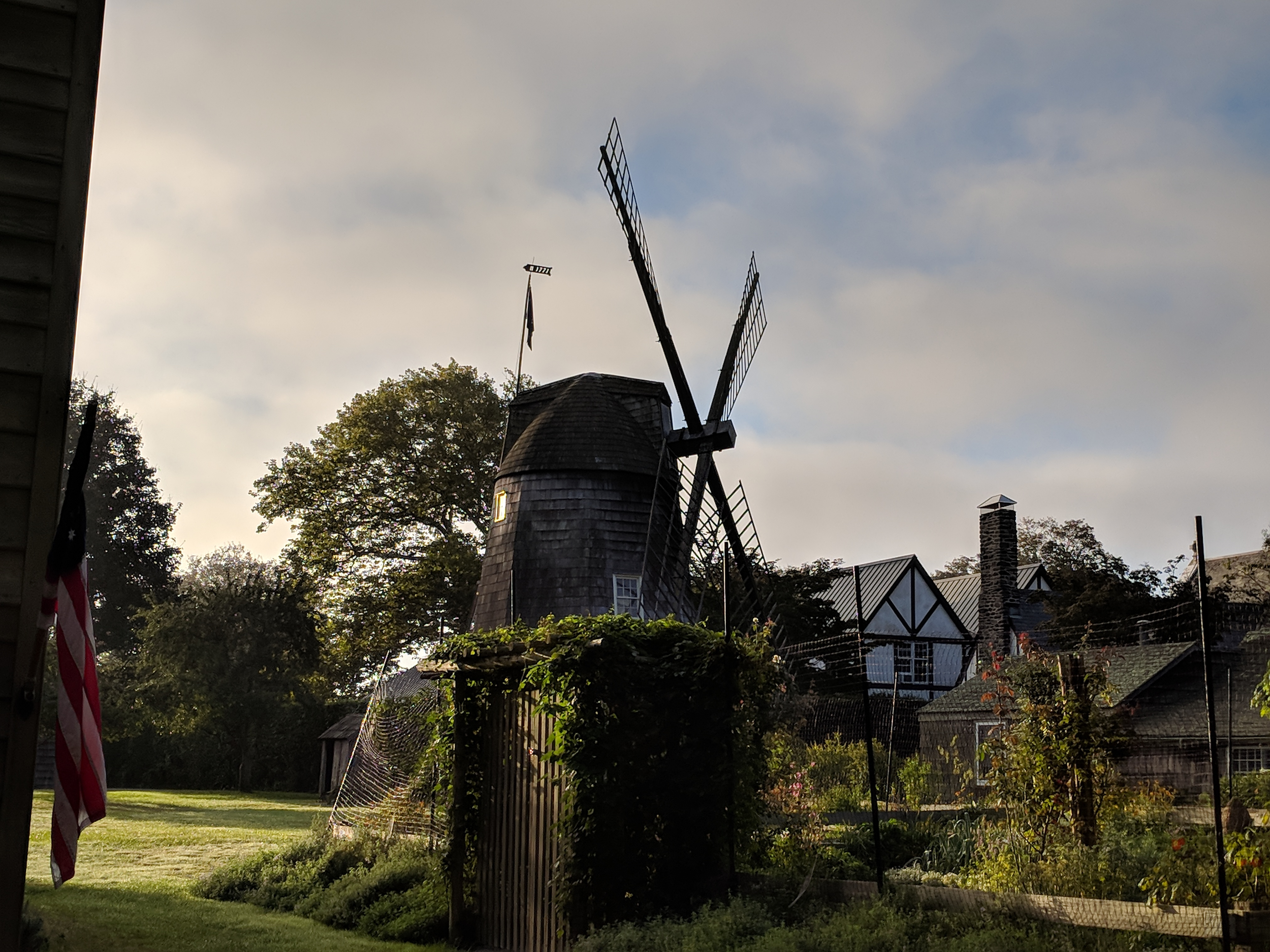
Farm in East Hampton, Long Island

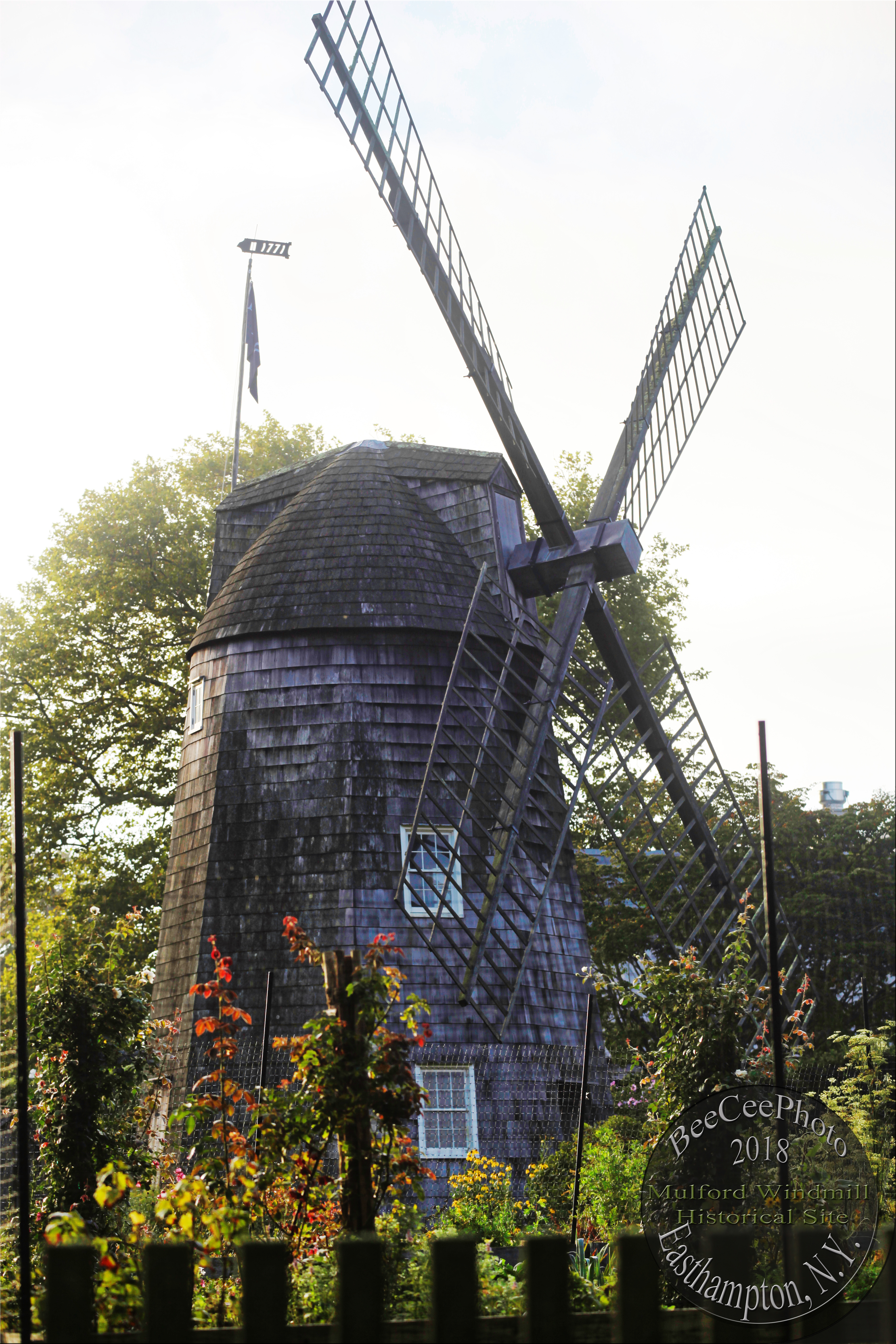
Pantigo Windmill

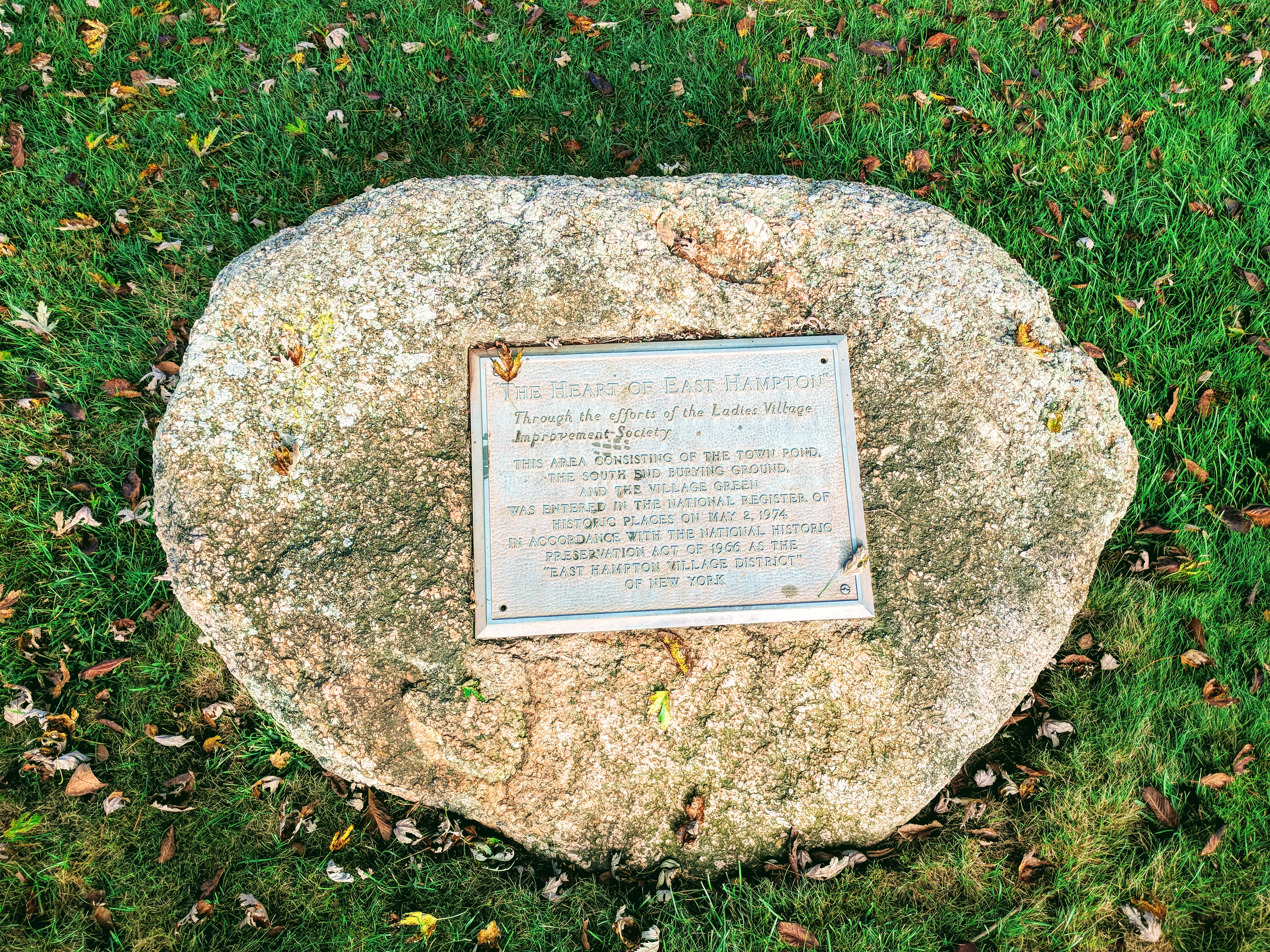
NRHP contributing structures and markers on the green

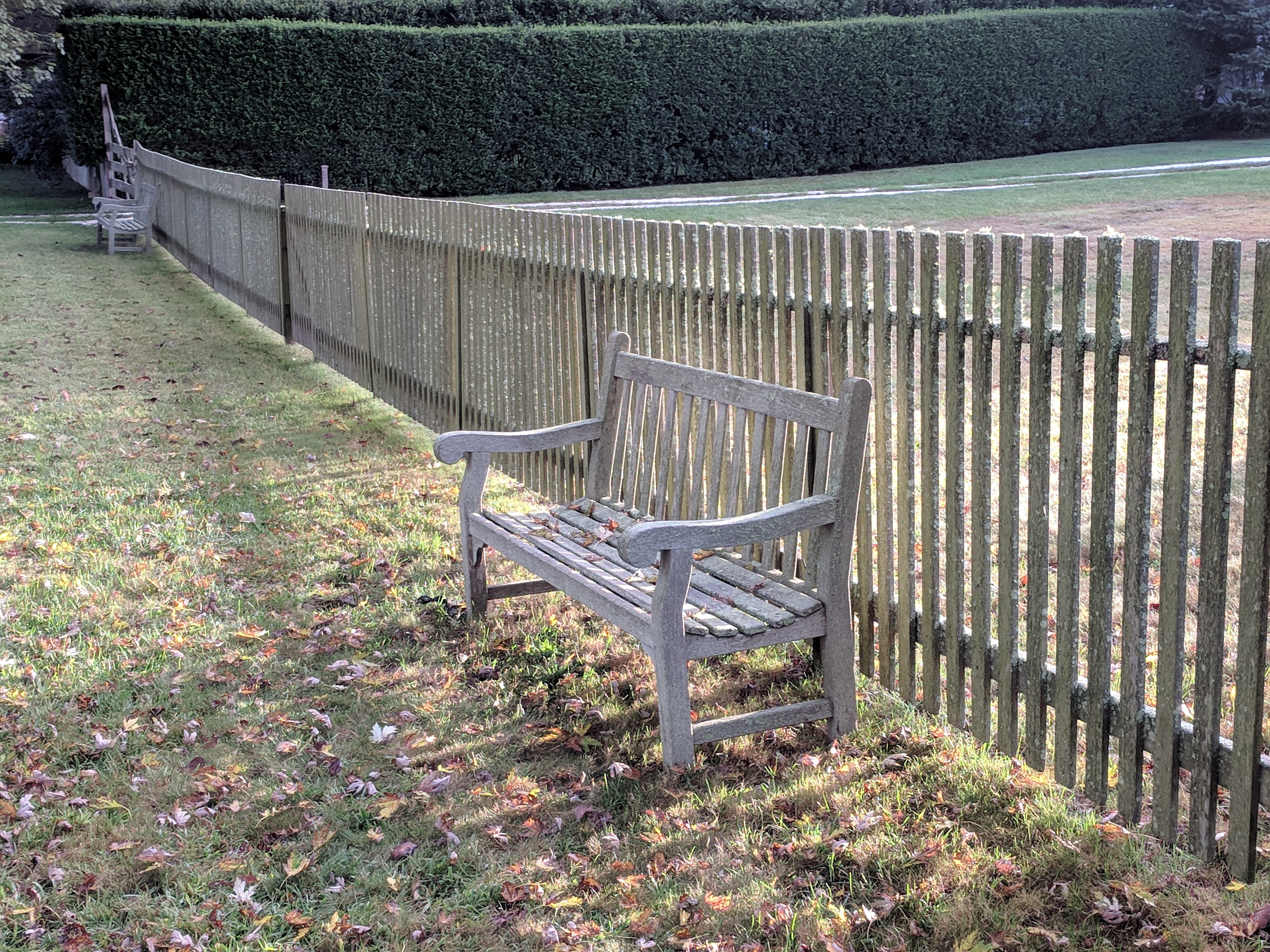
Seats outside Mulford Farm

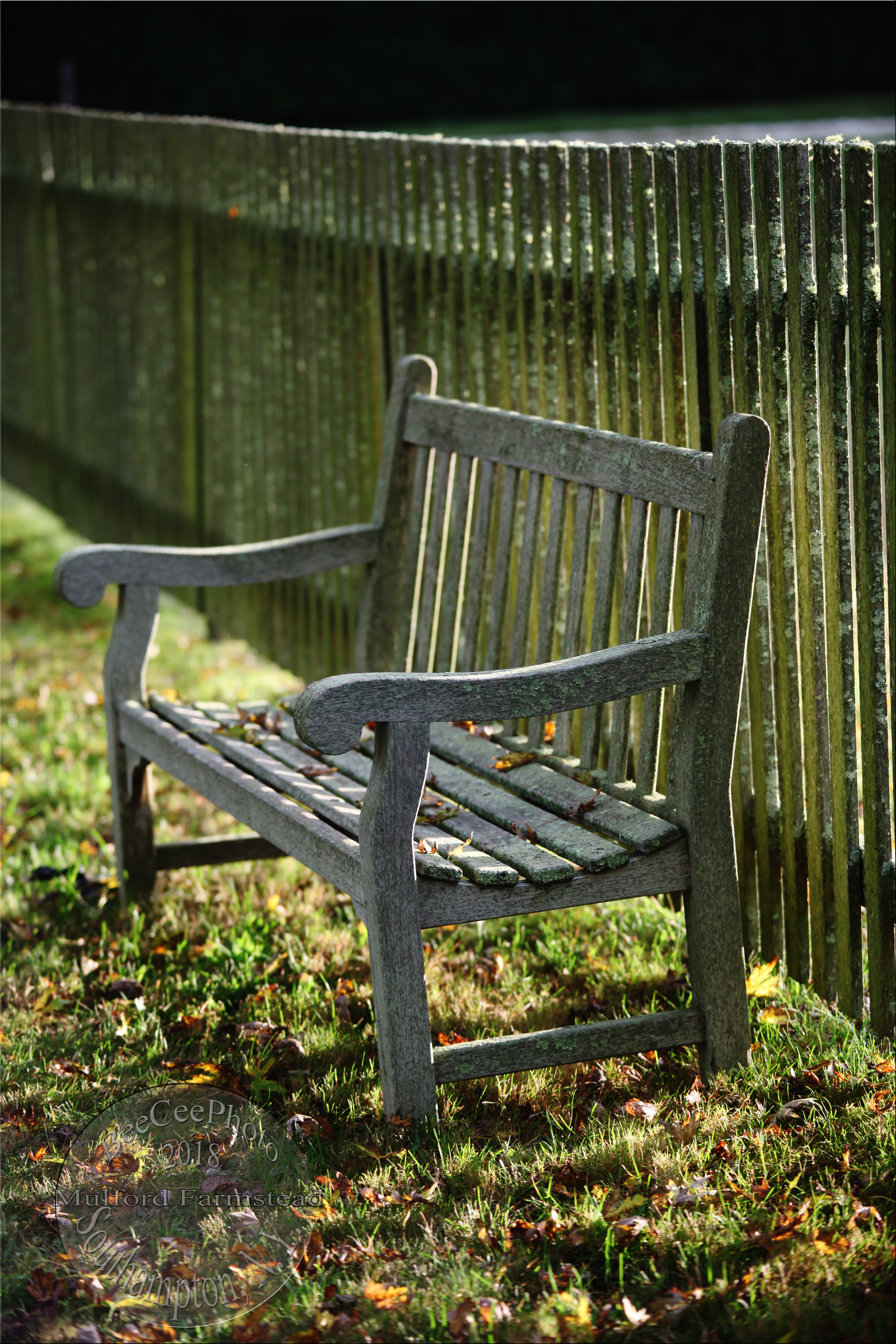
The street was lined with memorial markers and contemplation benches.

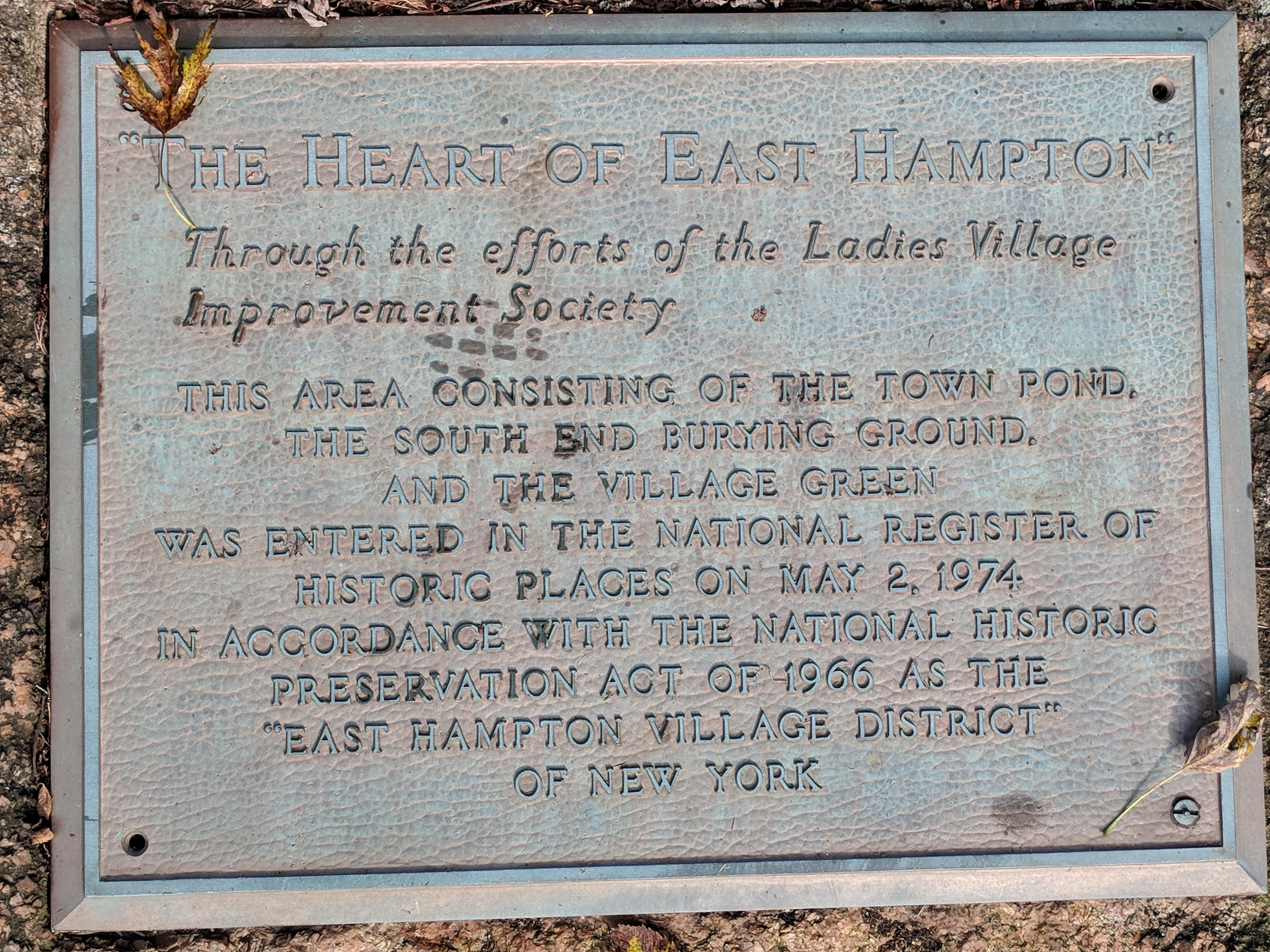
Mulford Farm is within the Village District

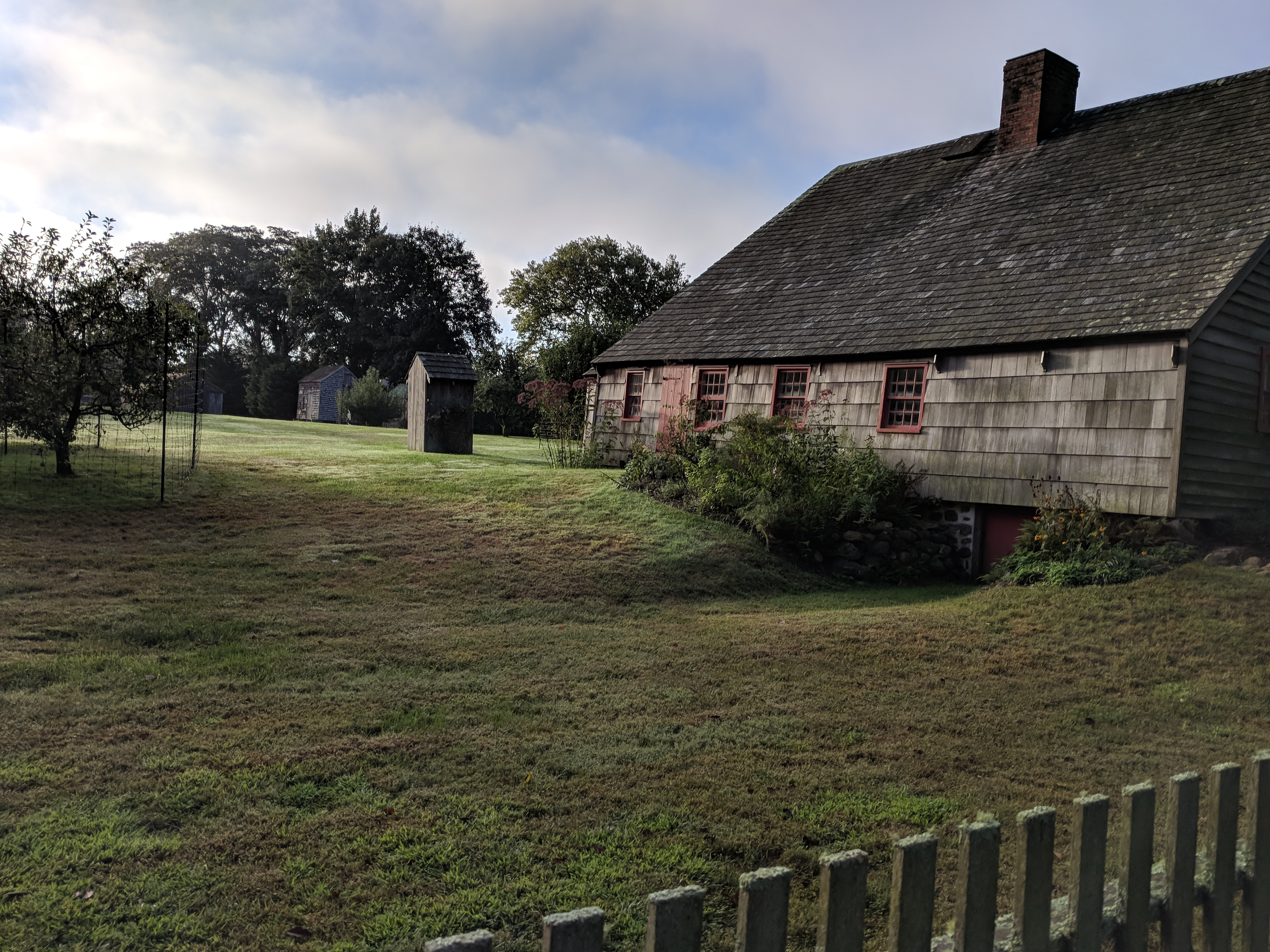
Mulford Farm privy is in center/left

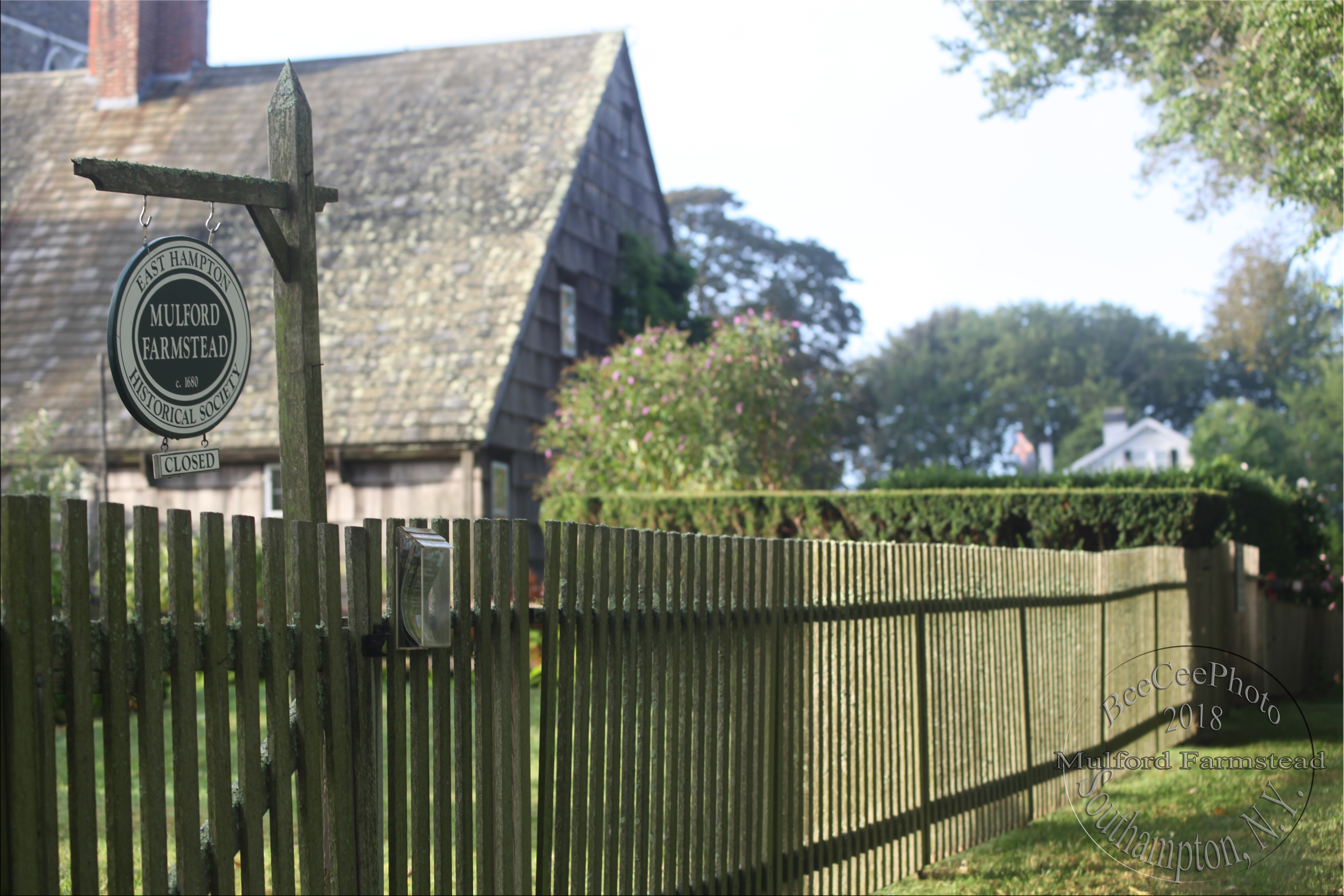
Home Sweet Home Museum

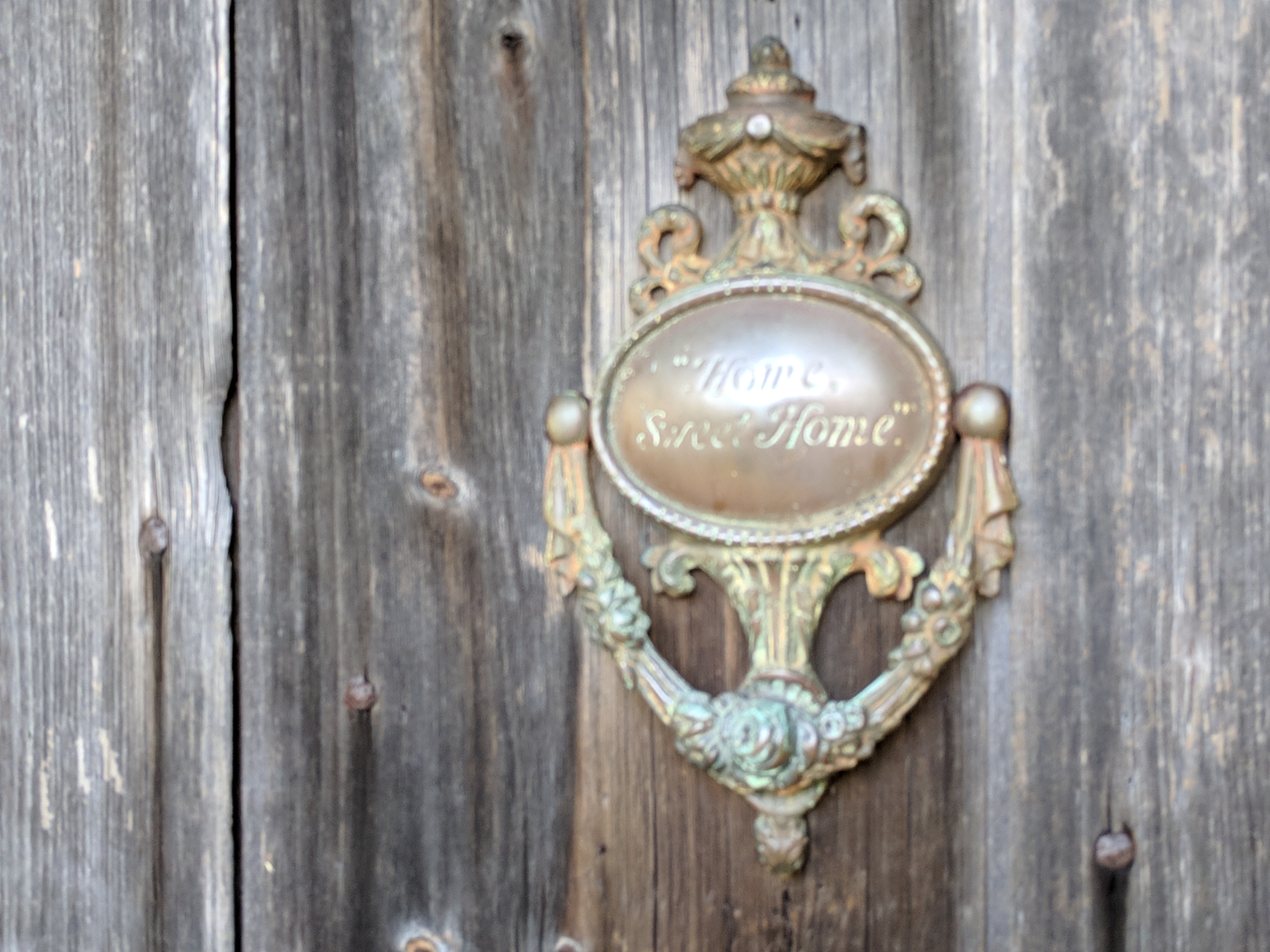
NRHP contributing structures on the green

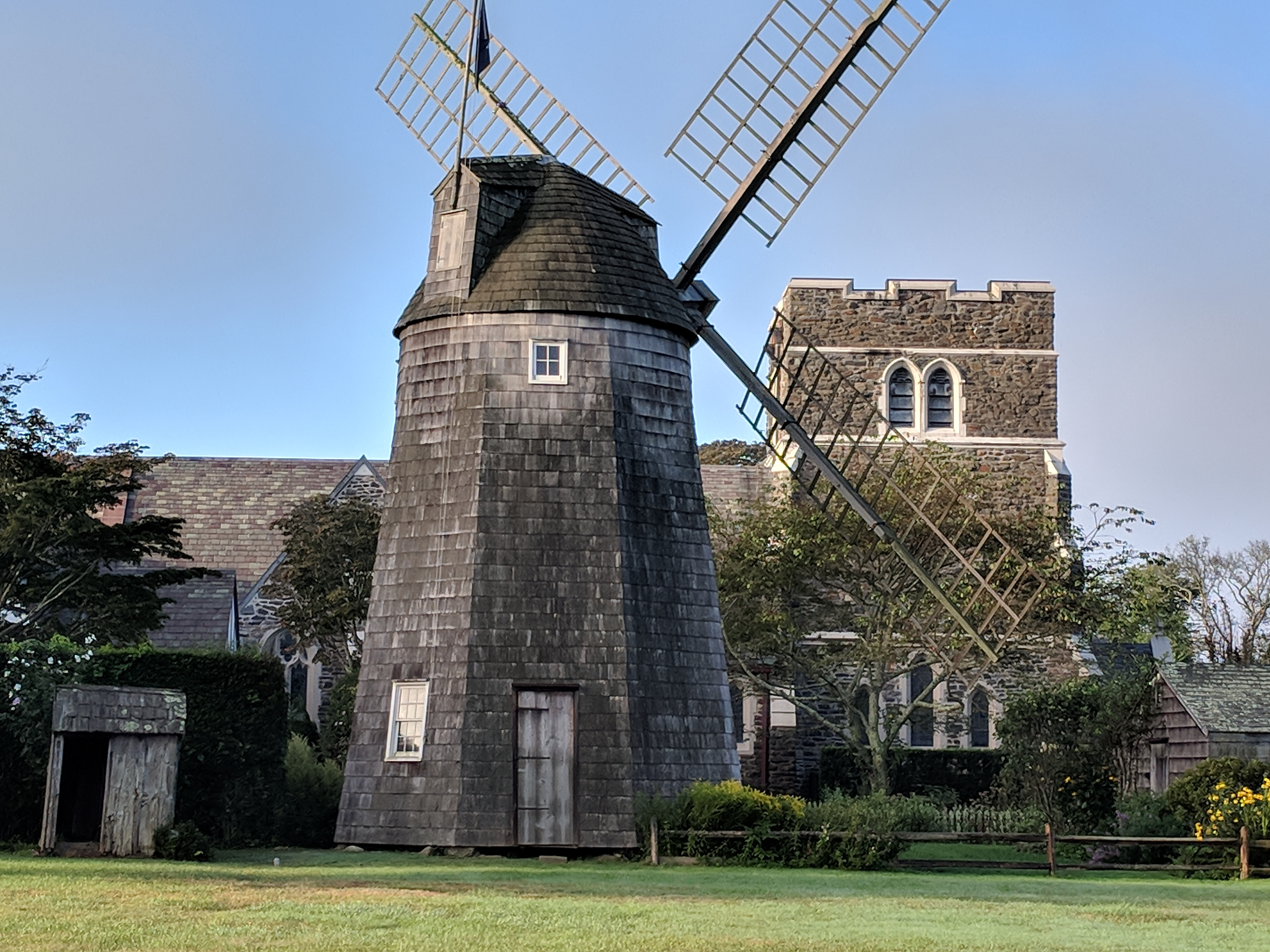
Pantigo Mill and St Lukes church

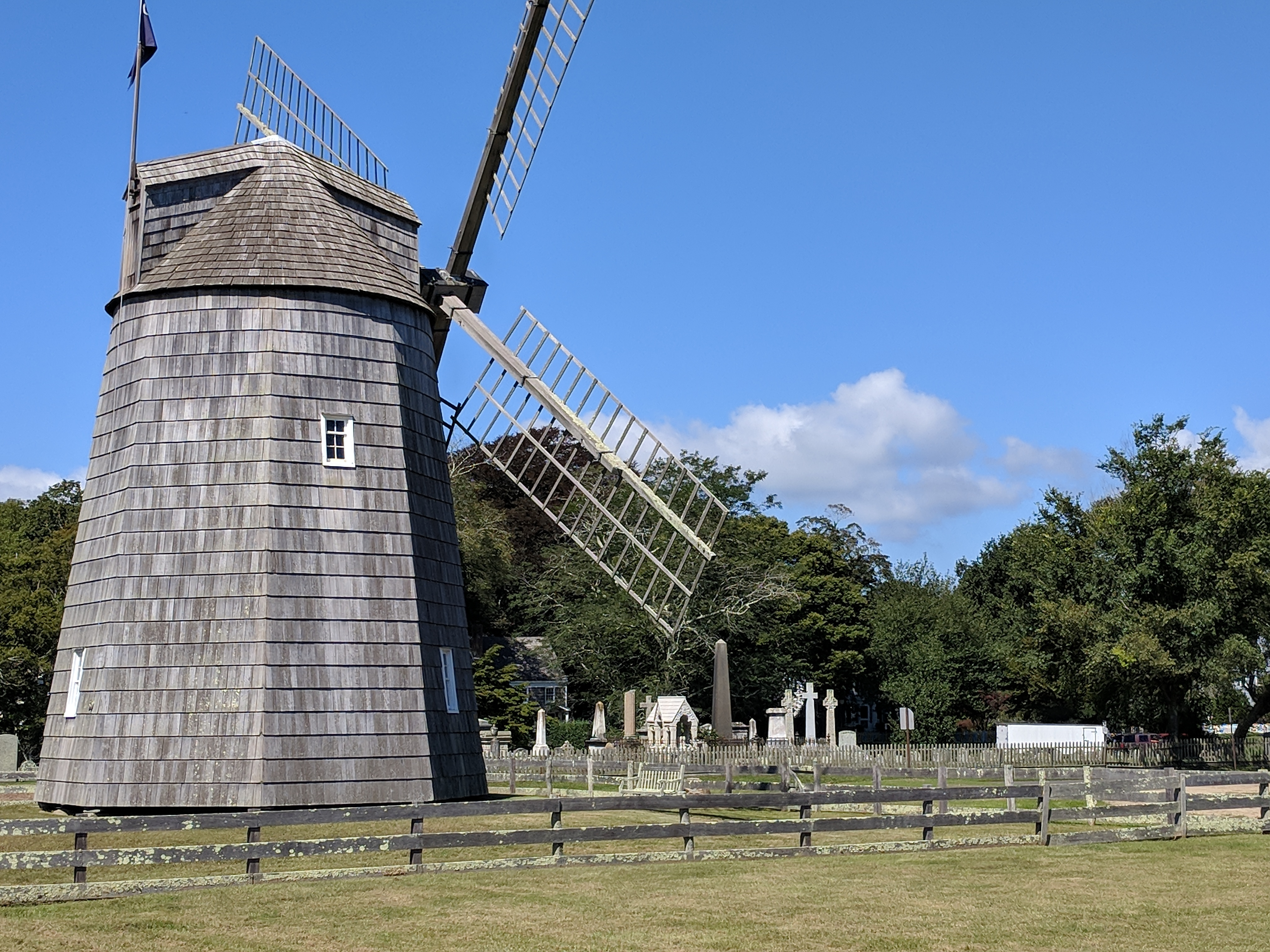
Gardiner Mill

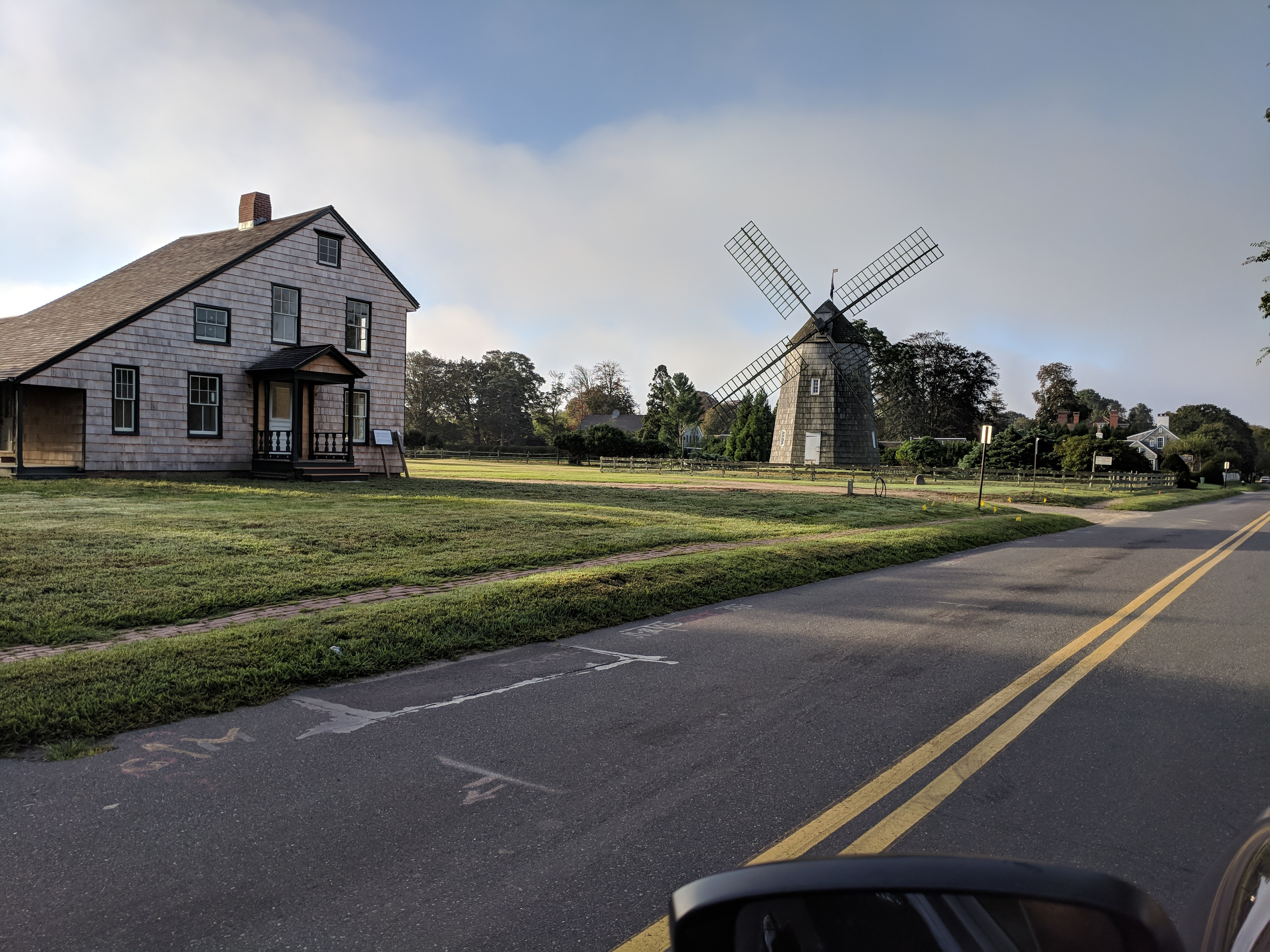
Gardiner mill and replica saltbox house

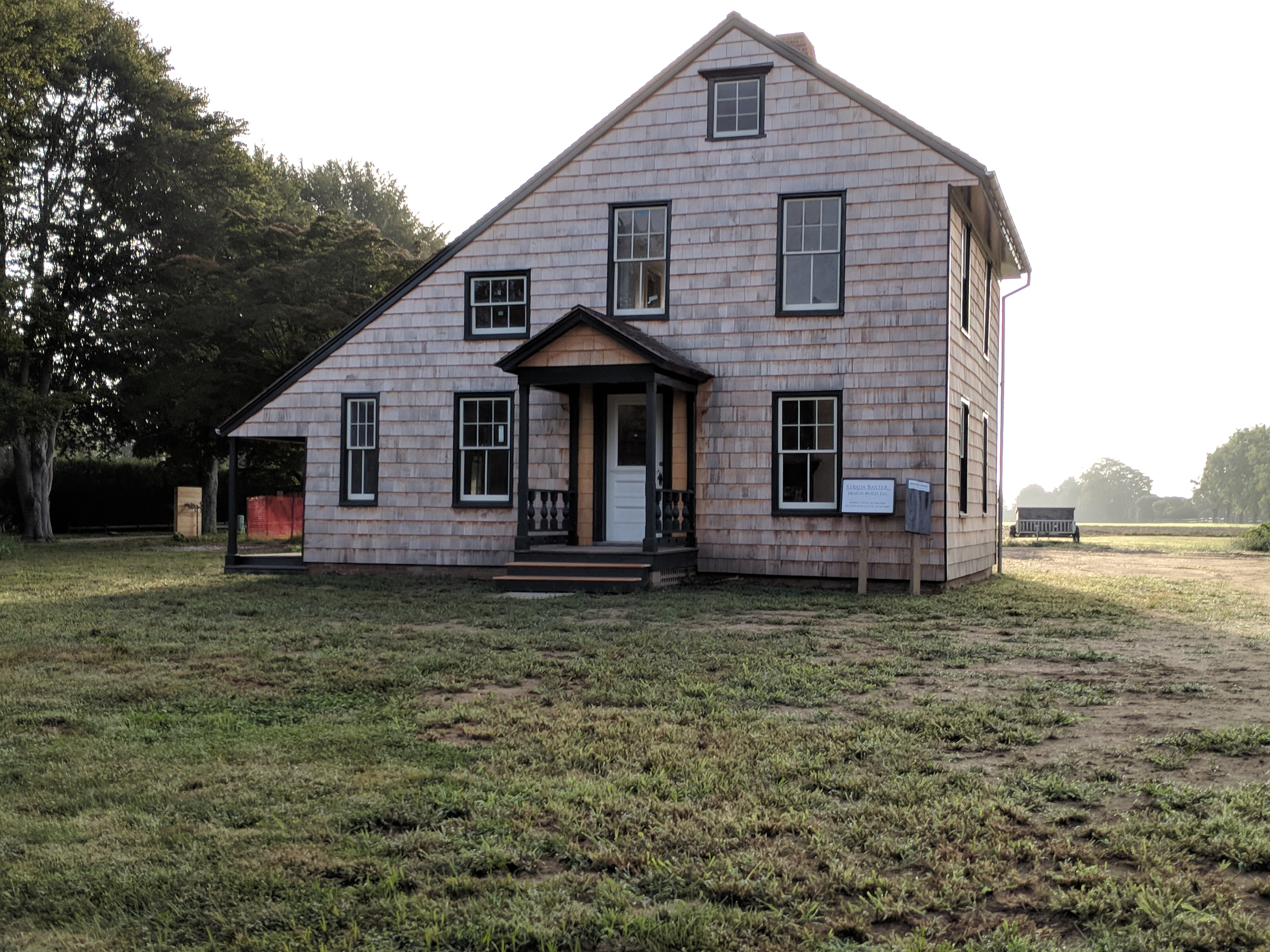
Replica of John Lyon Gardiner Cottage

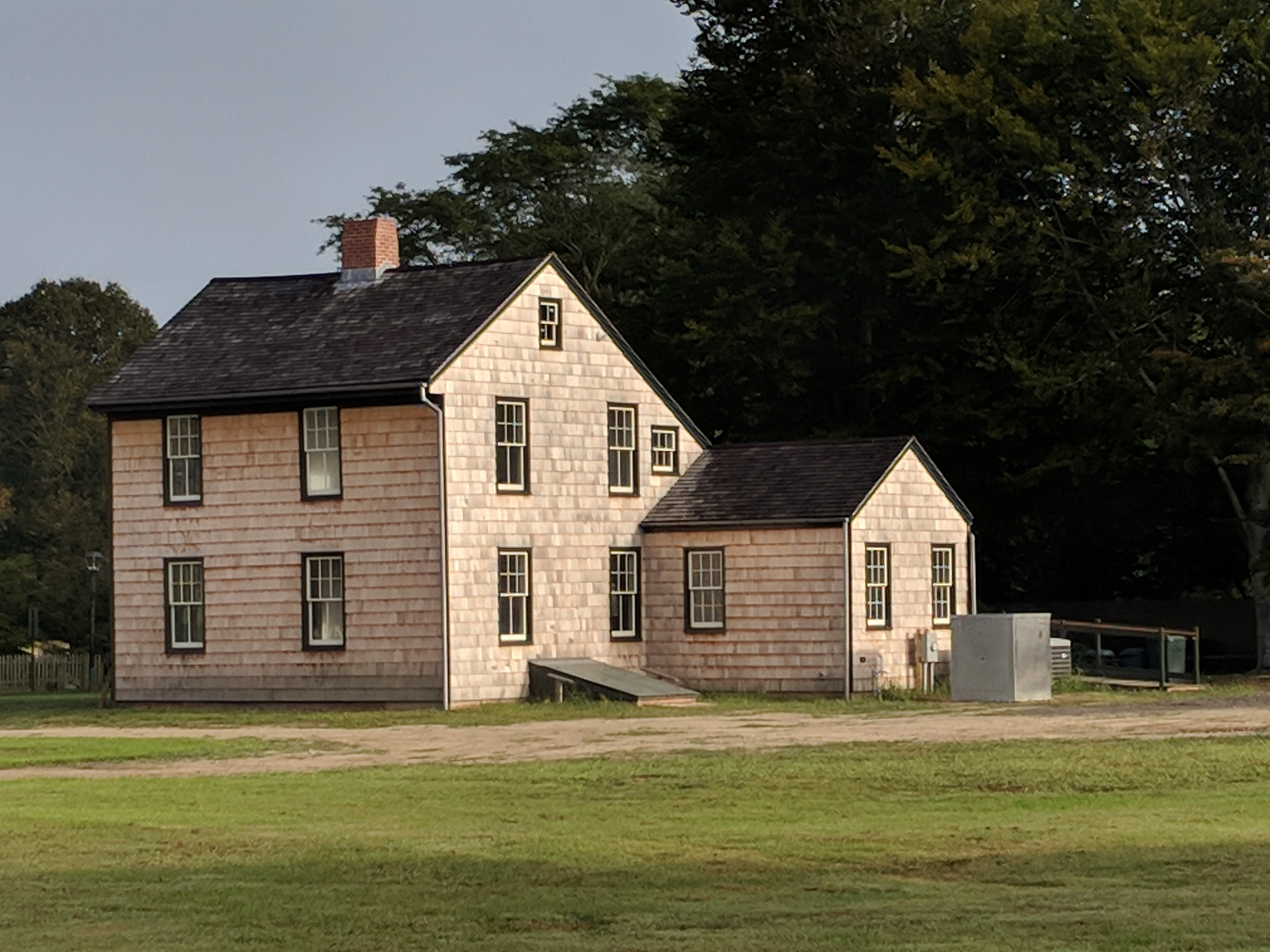
Rear view

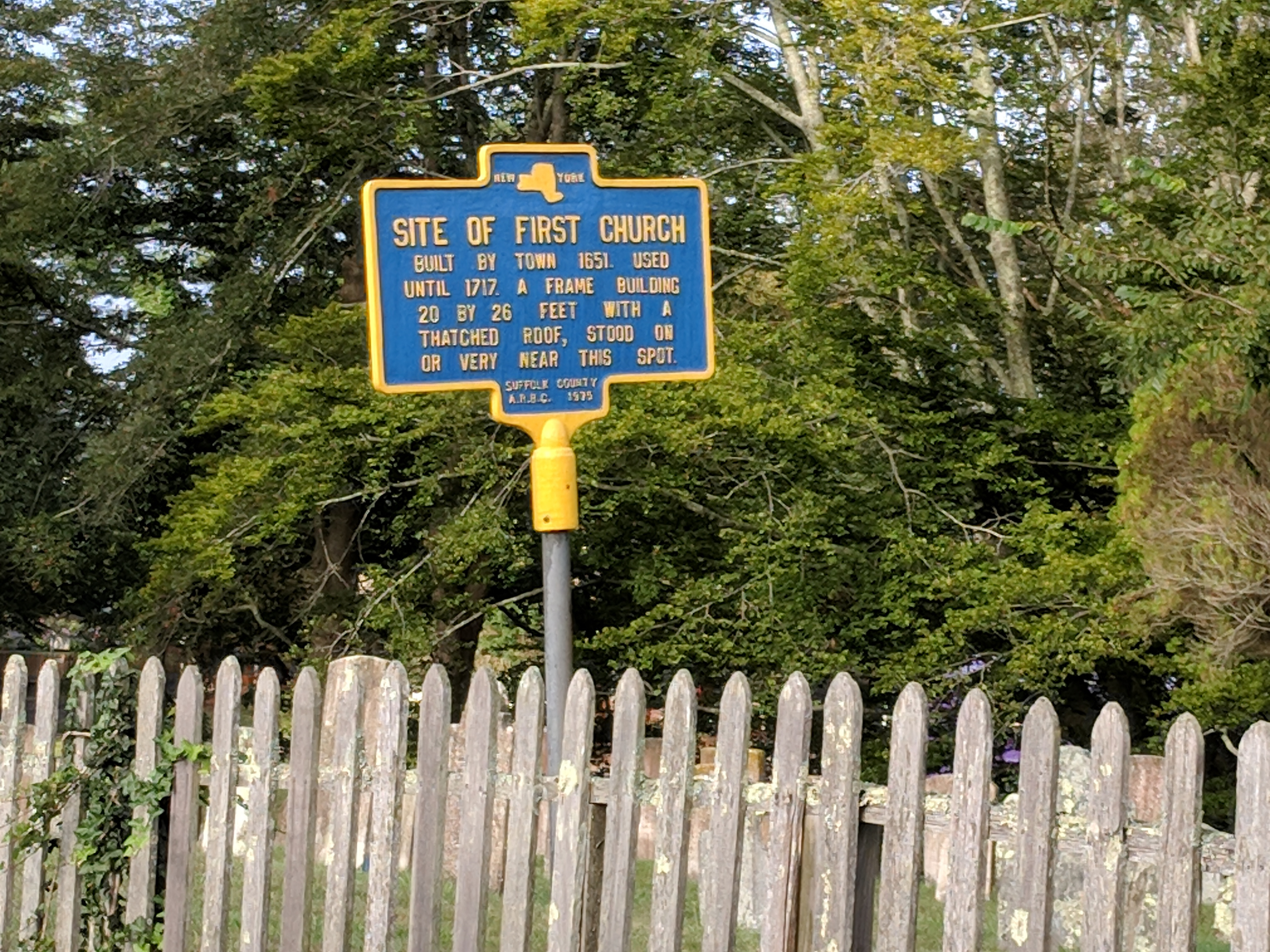
NRHP contributing structures and markers on the green

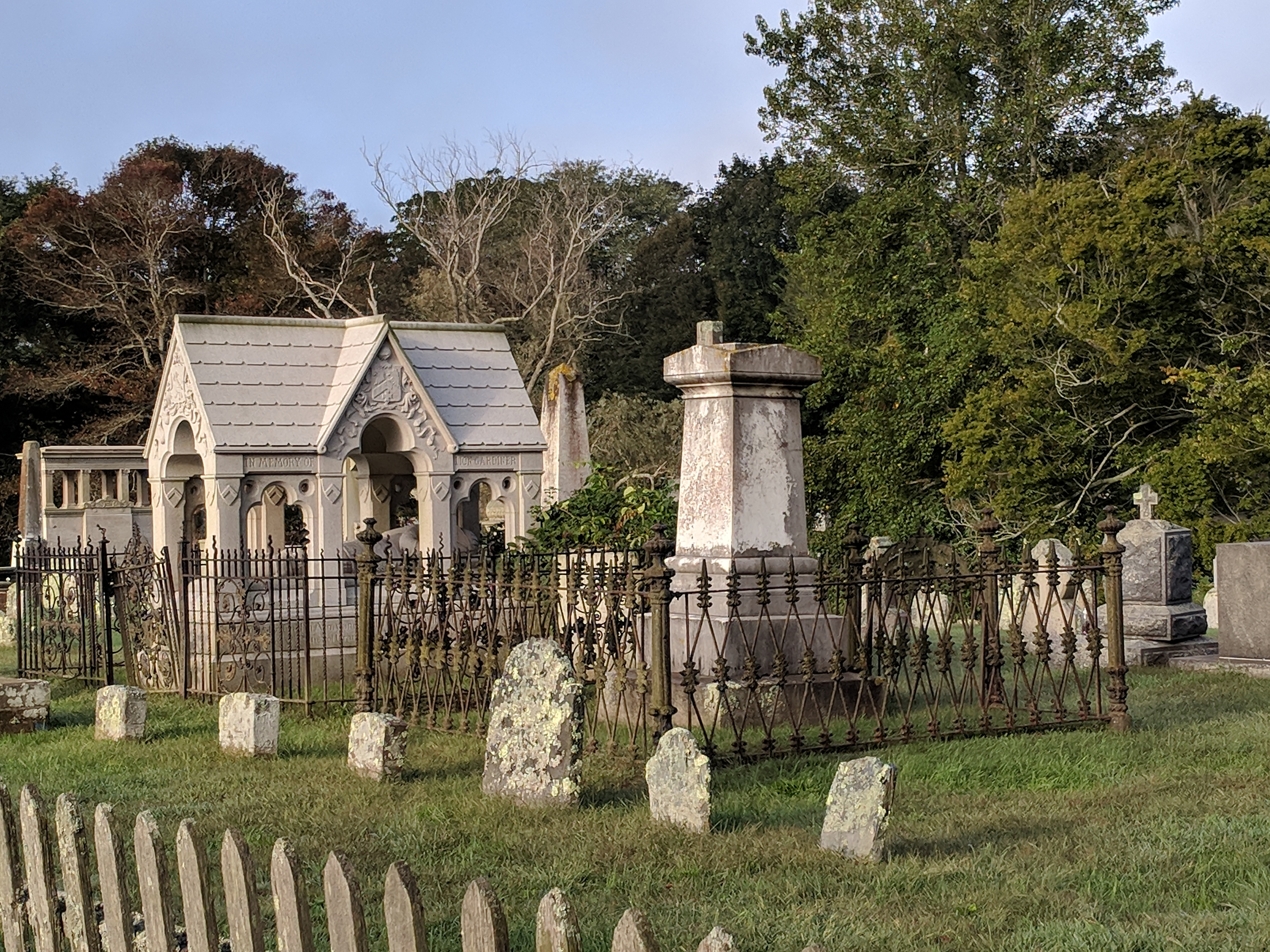
South End Cemetery

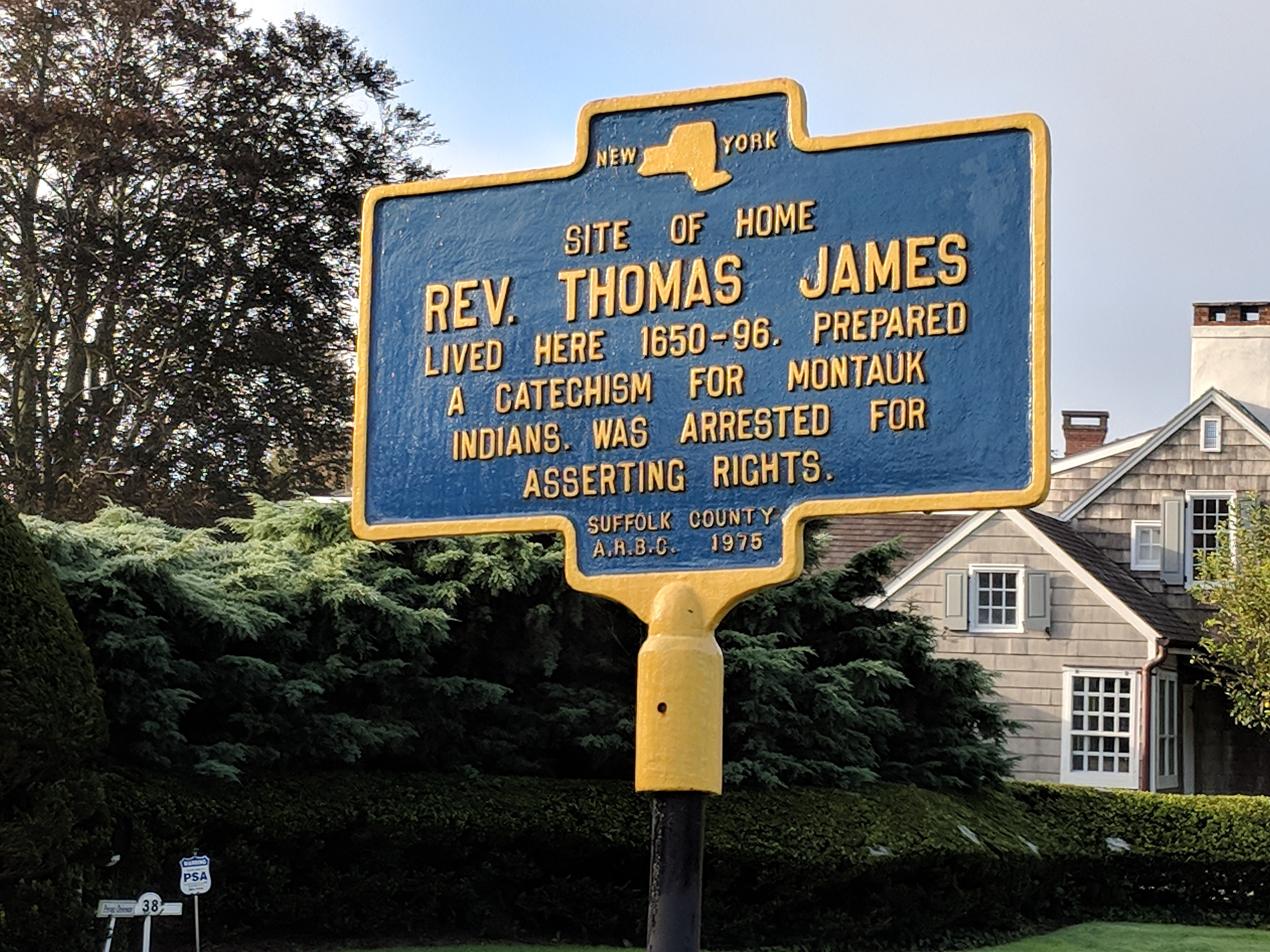
Rev Thomas James, noted as first pastor

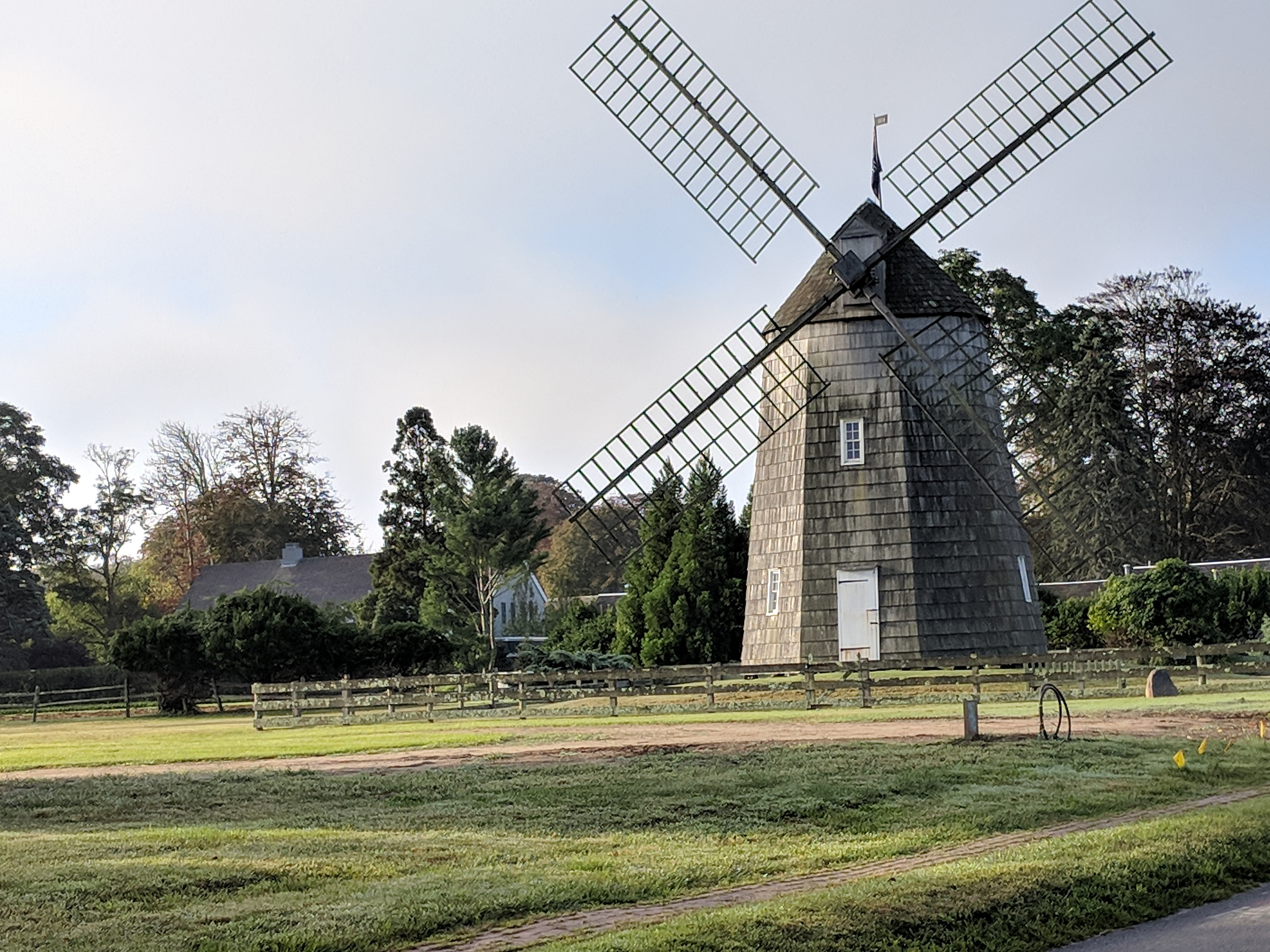
Gardiner Mill, 1804

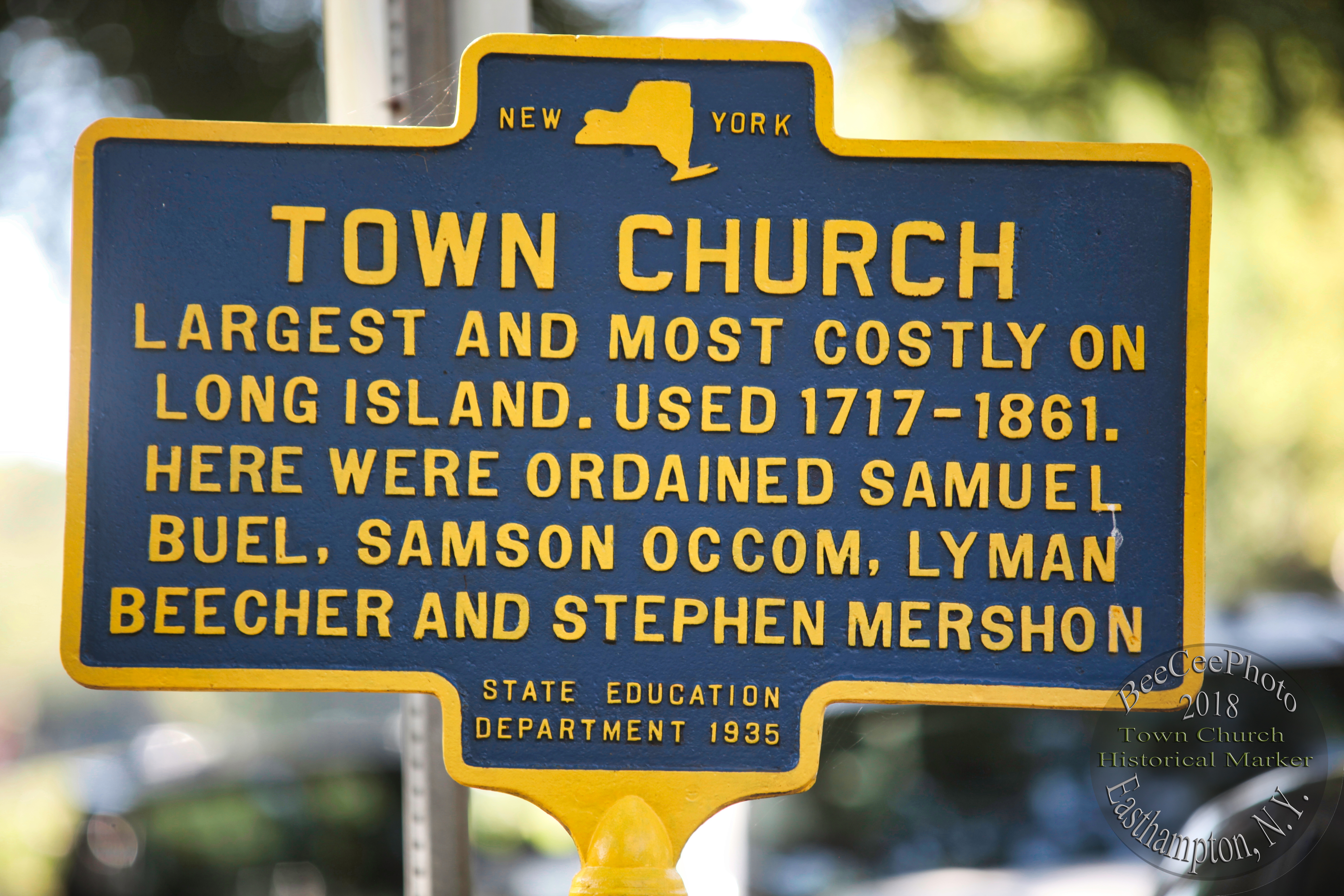
Town Church HM

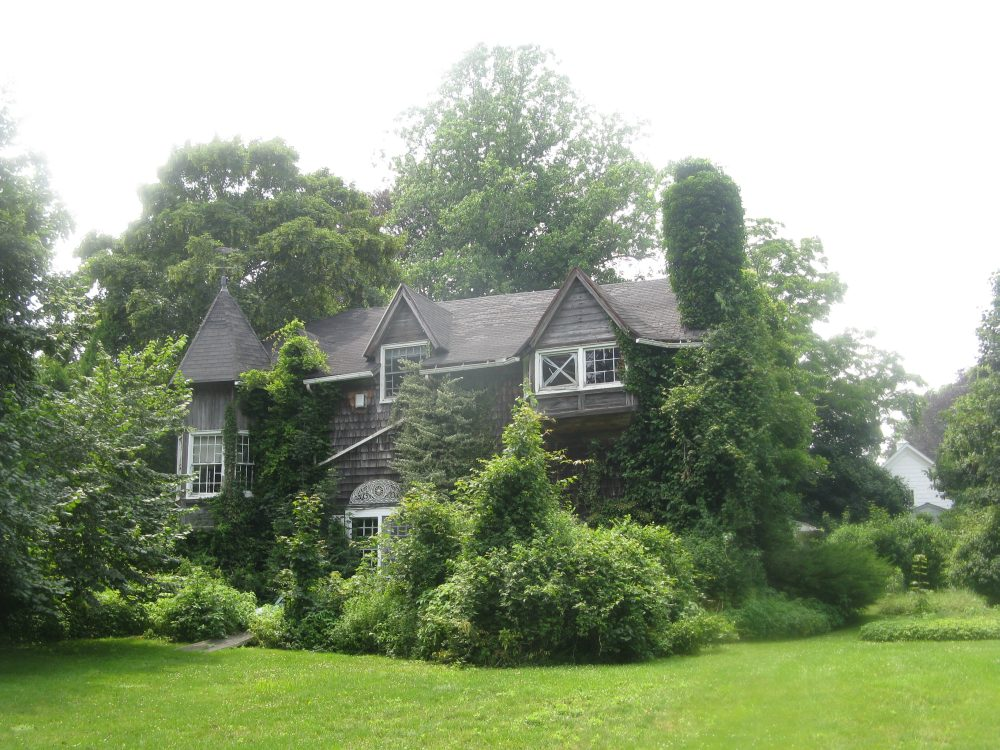
Thomas Moran House, a National Historic Landmark

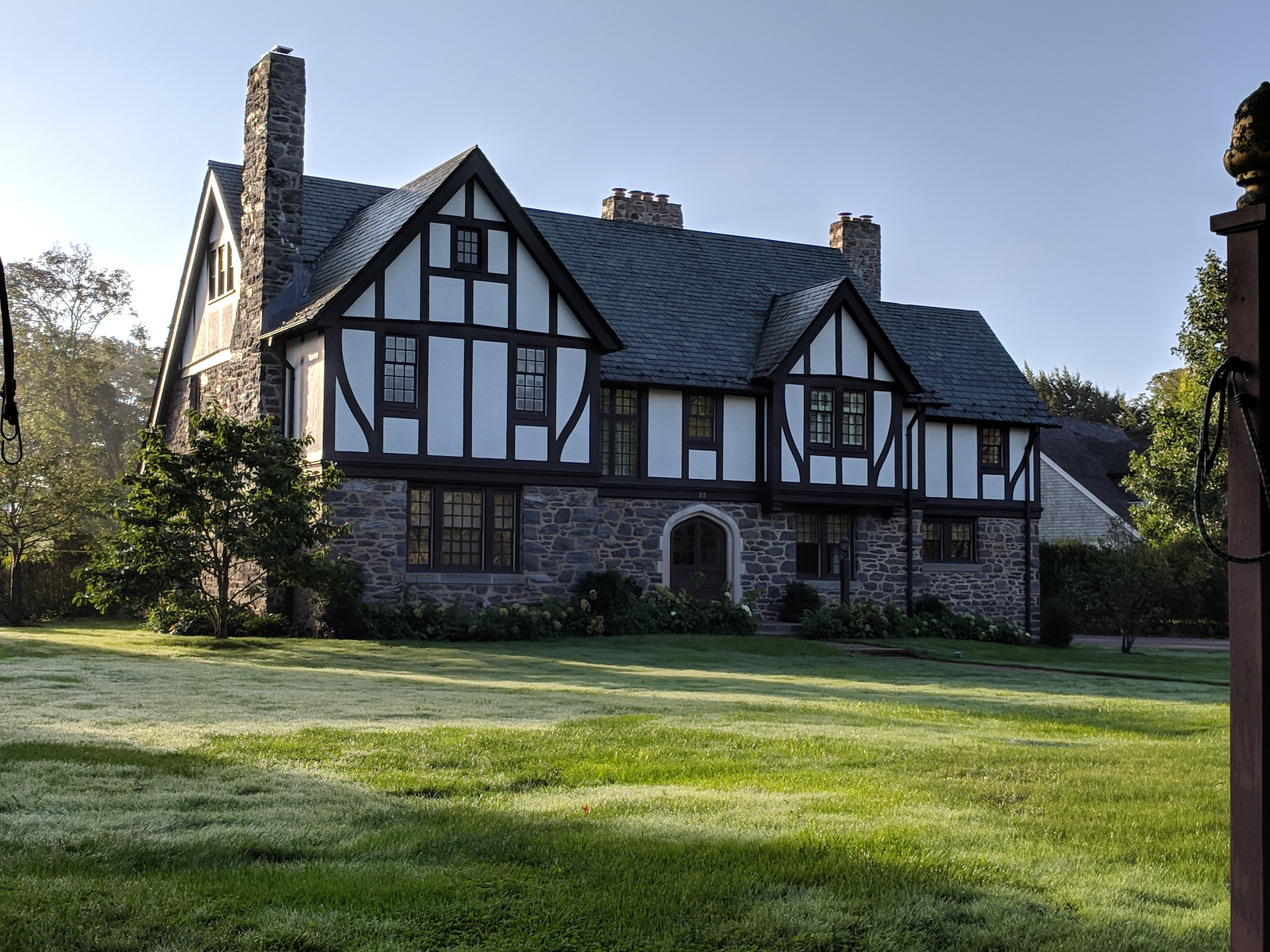
NRHP St. Lukes Rectory

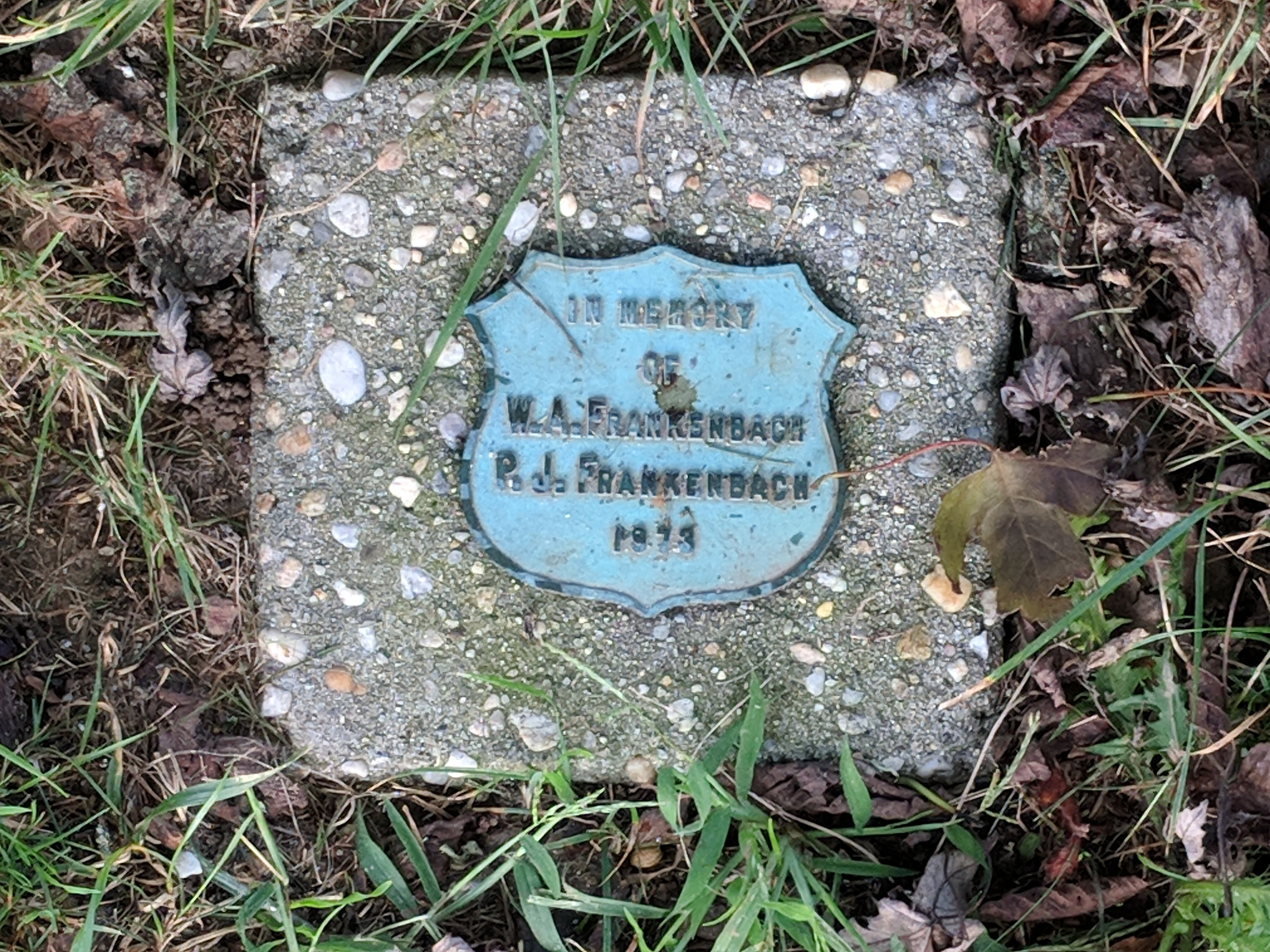
Contributing structures and markers on the green, tree marker

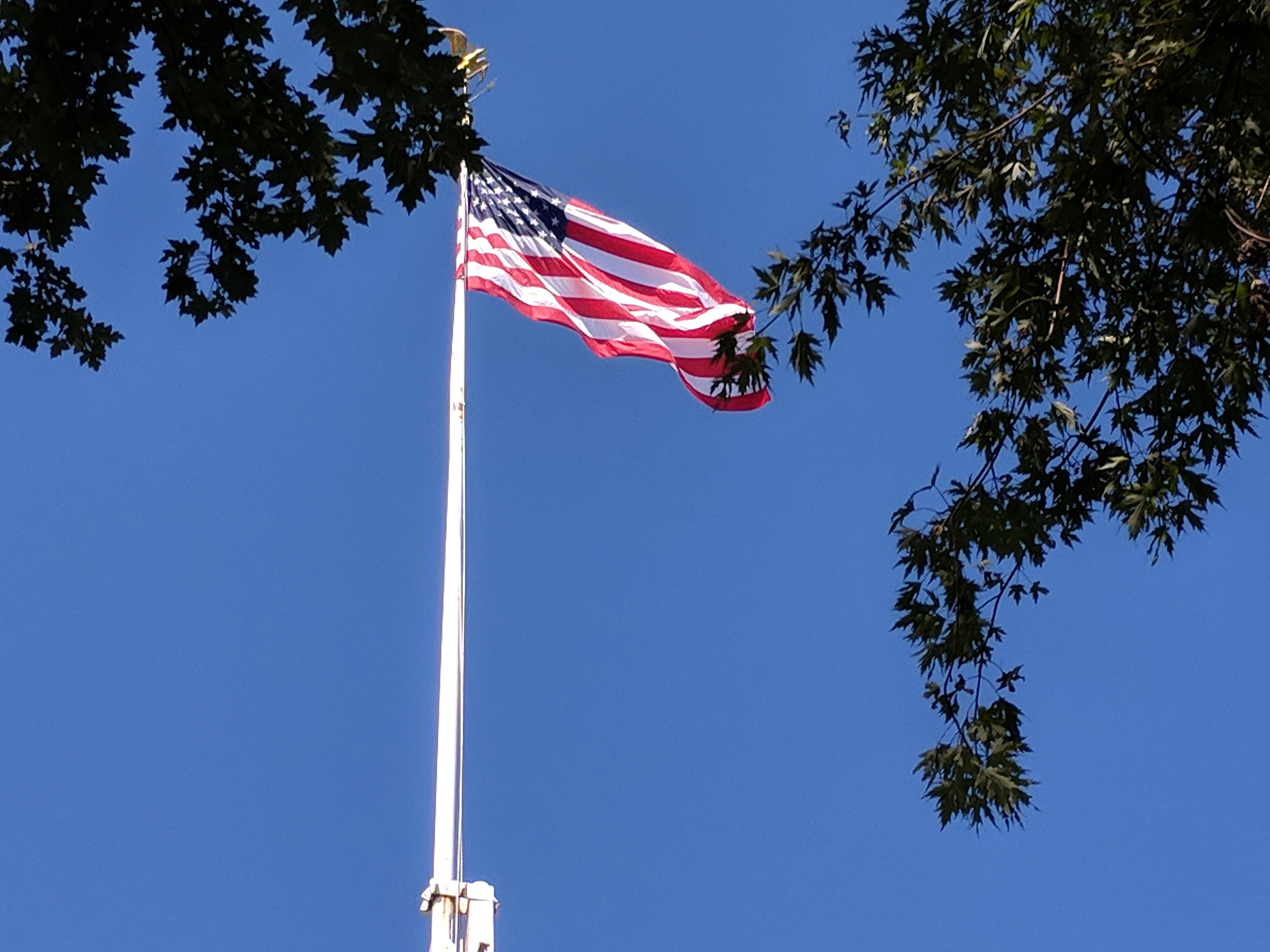
“This Flag Pole dedicated to the Village of East Hampton in memory of George Lodowick McAlpin, 1856-1922, by members of his family, July 4, 1926.” — Plaque.

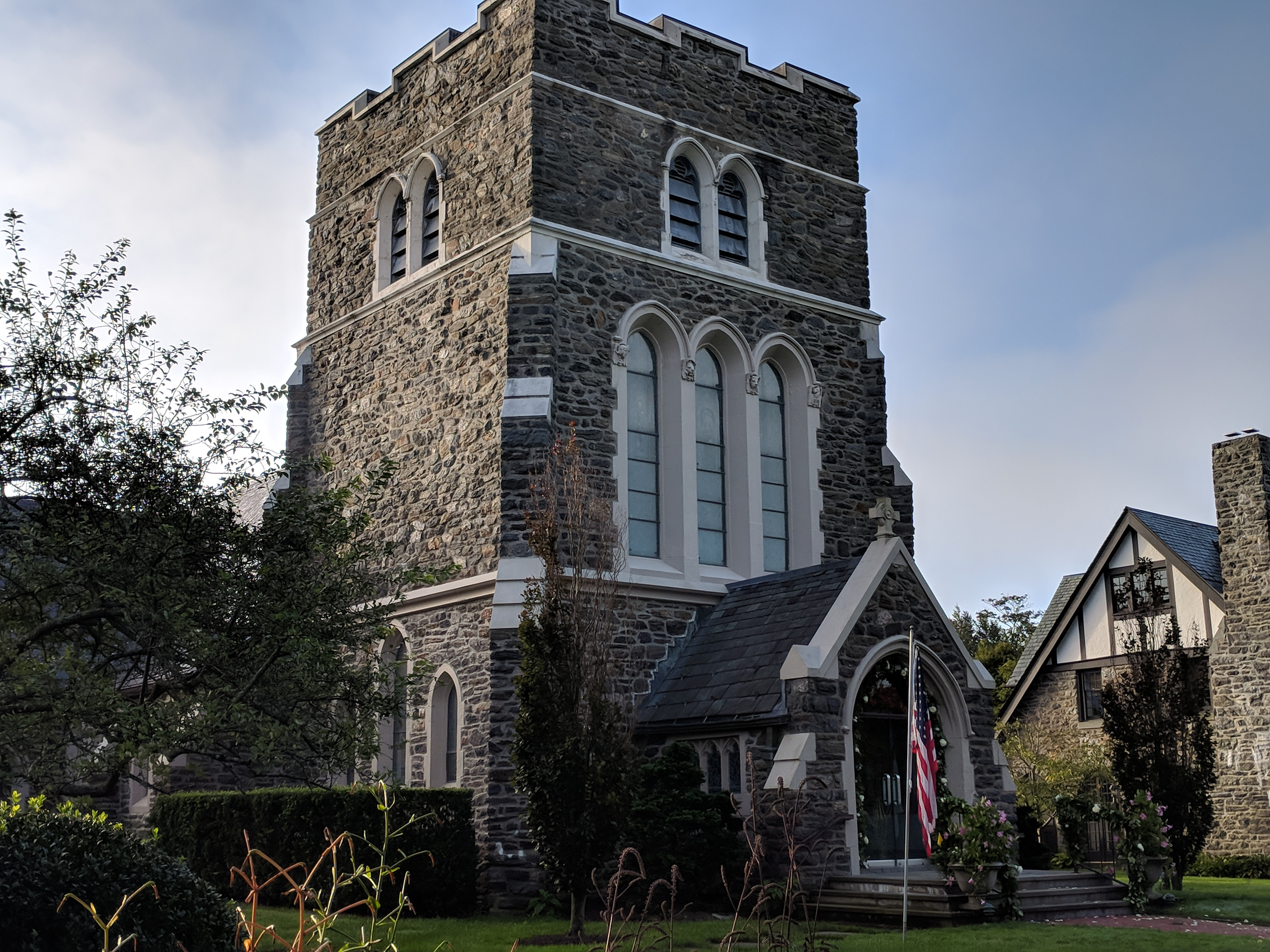
St. Lukes Episcopal - Entrance hall and bell tower

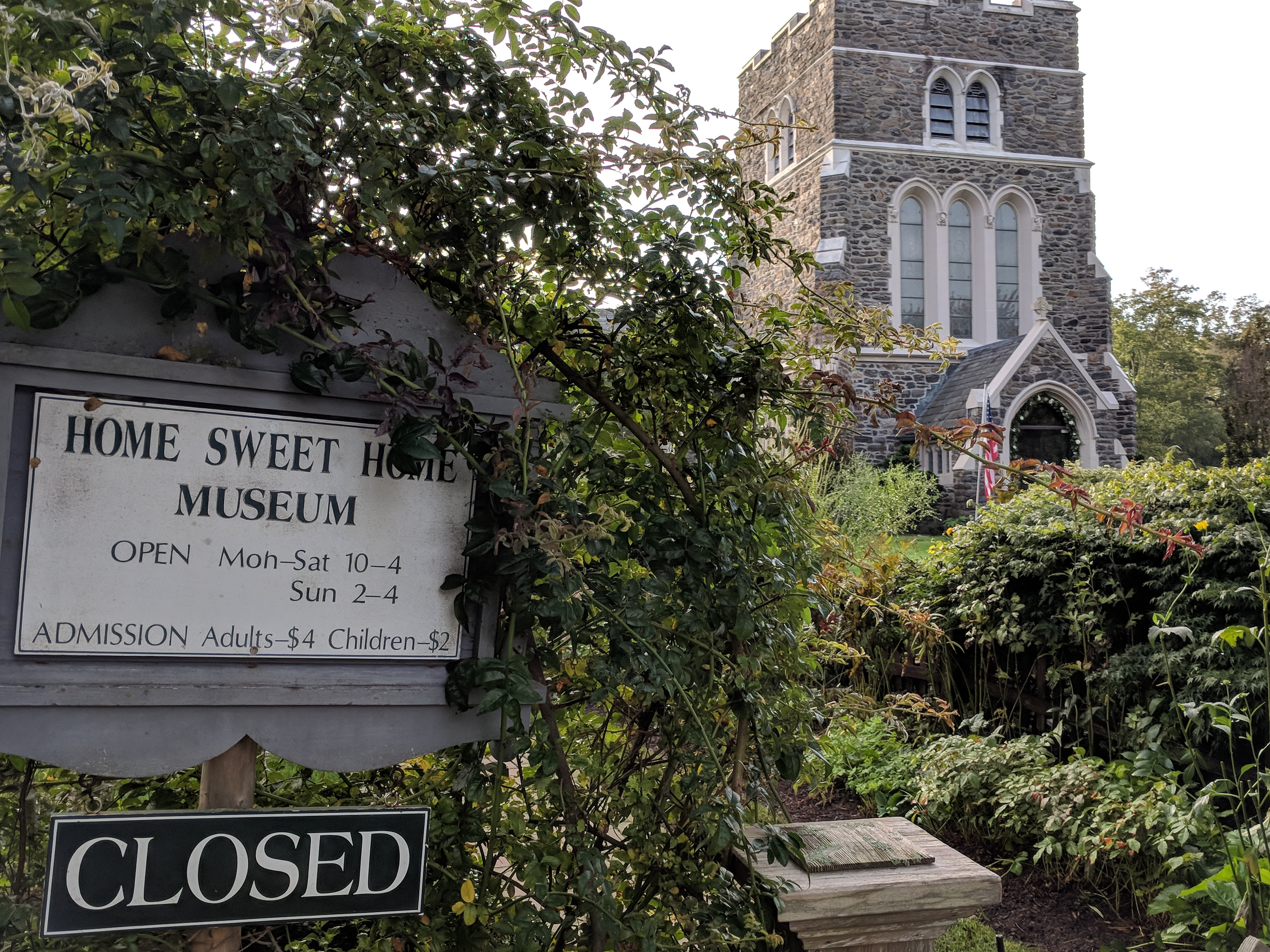
The foreground sign is at the entrance to the Home Sweet Home museum; the building in background is St. Luke's Church

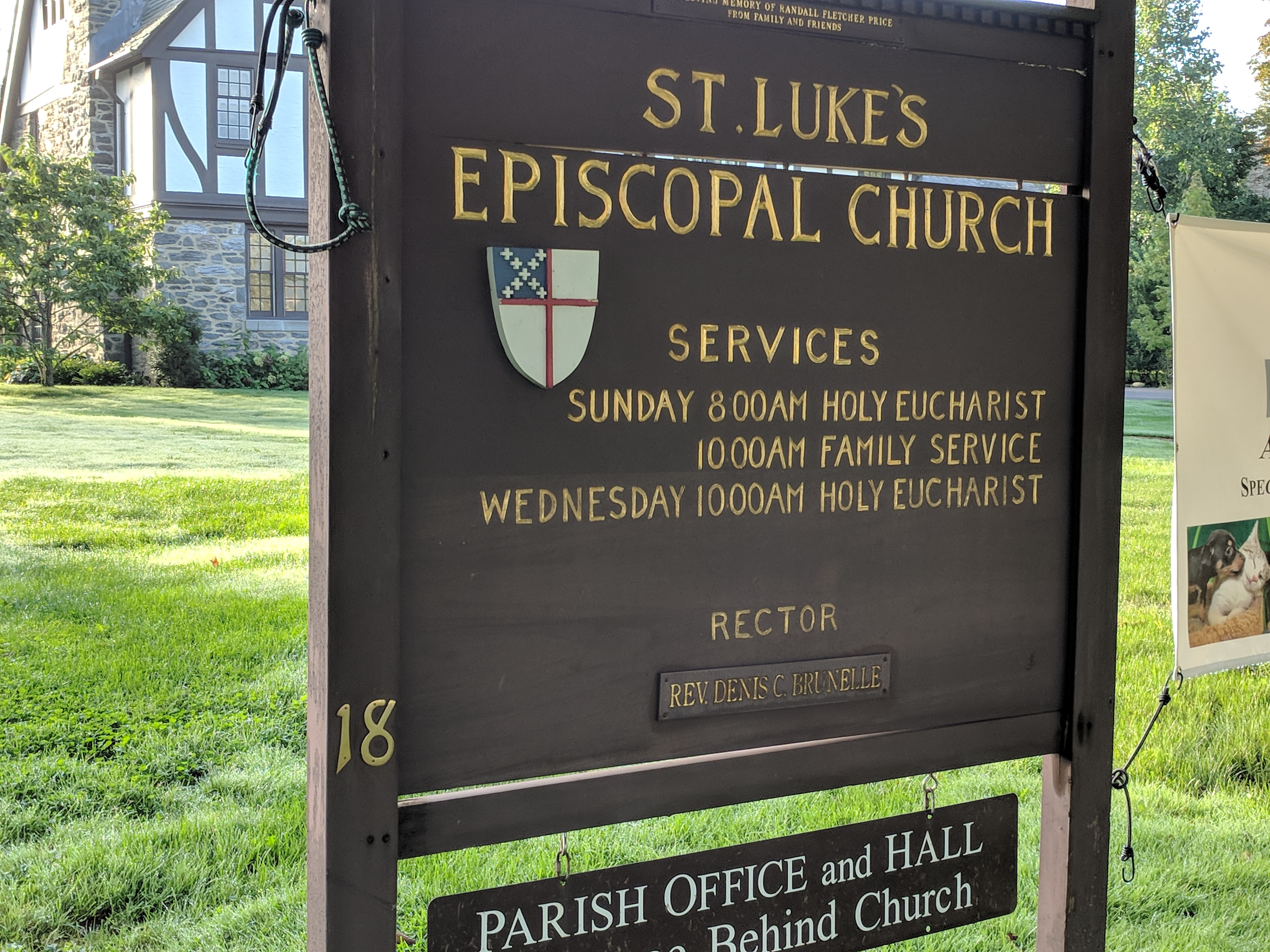
Services billboard

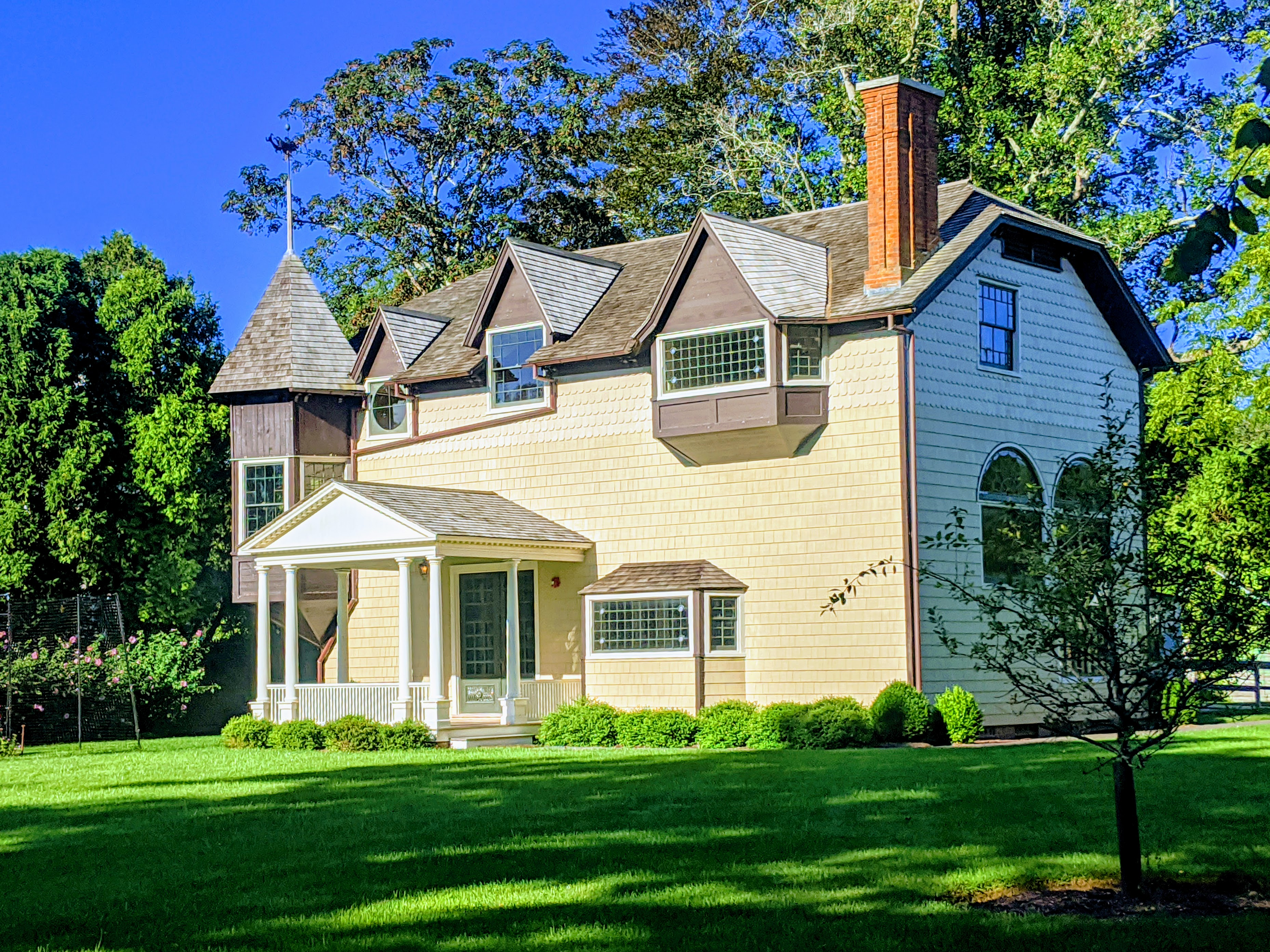
Residence and studio of artist Thomas Moran; operated as house museum

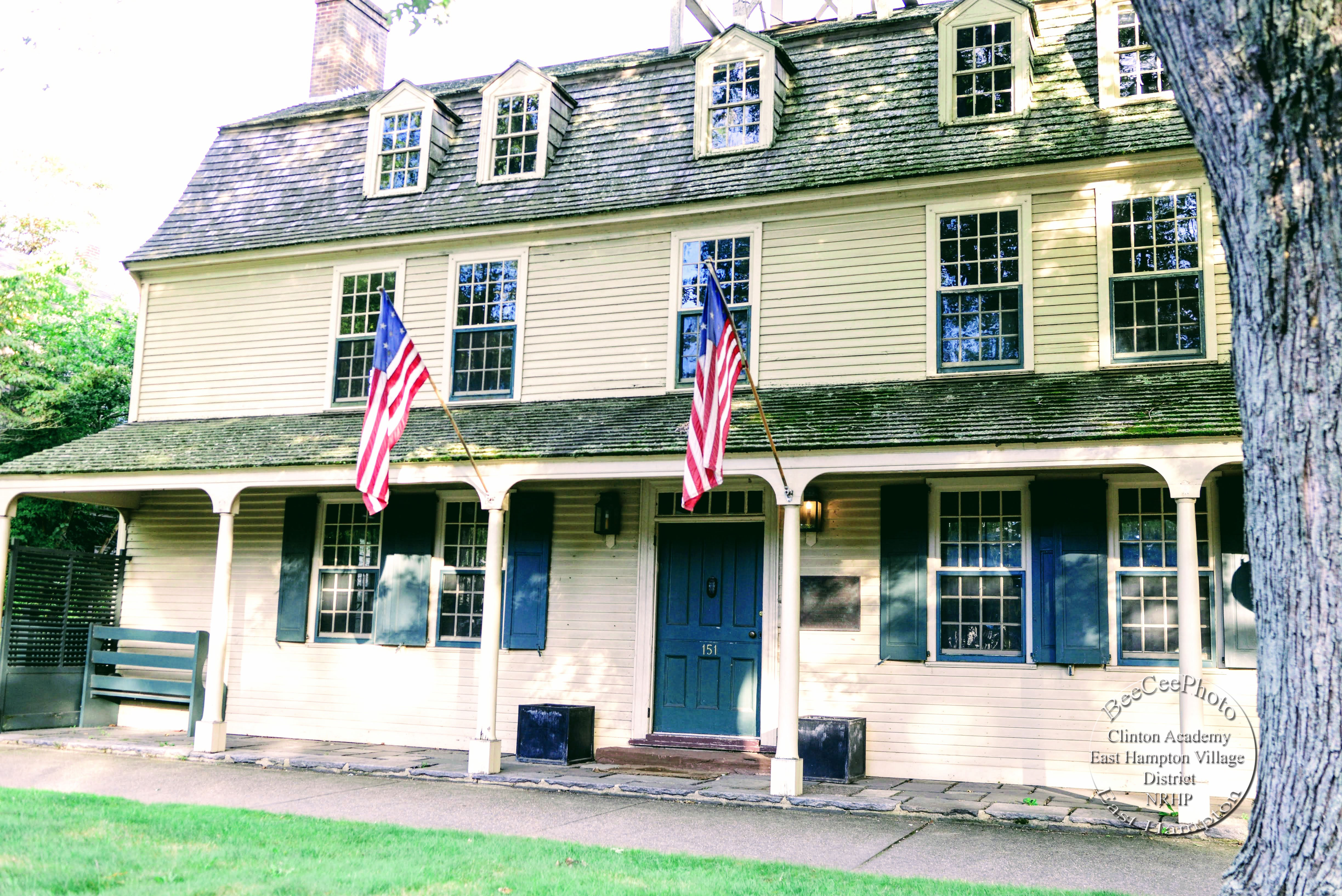
Clinton Academy - c.1784 First academy chartered in New York state

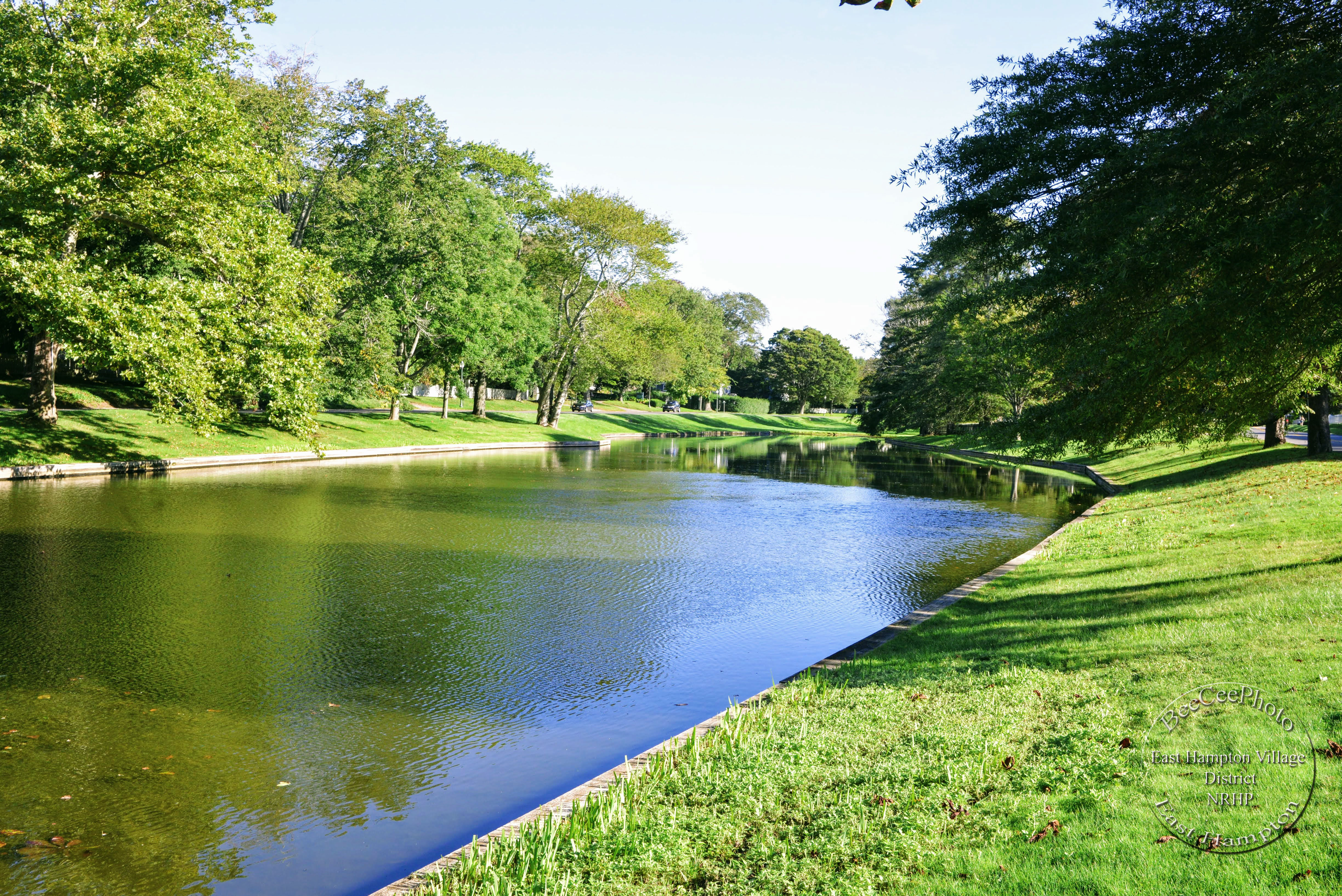
Town Pond from the west

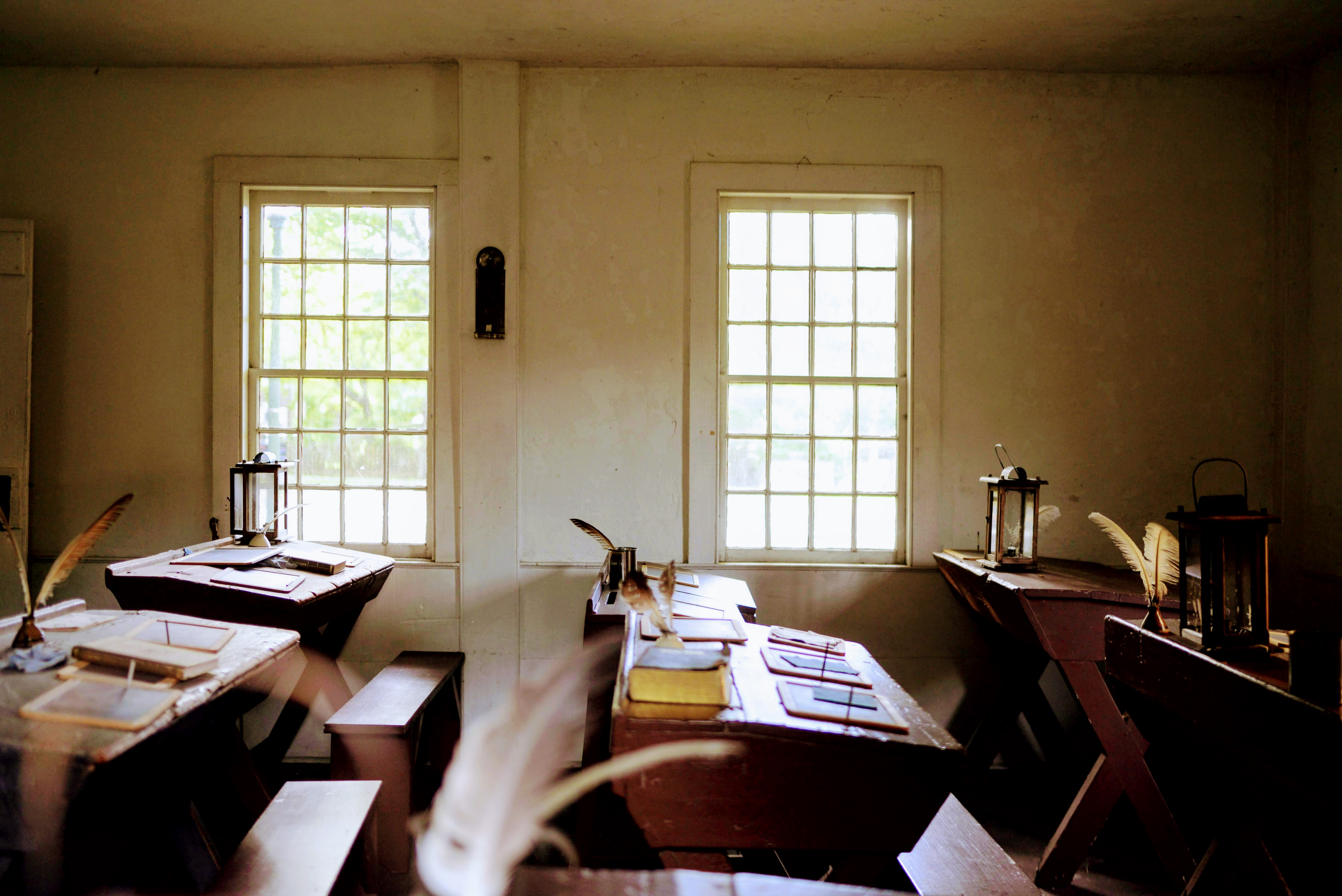
Town school house, inside view

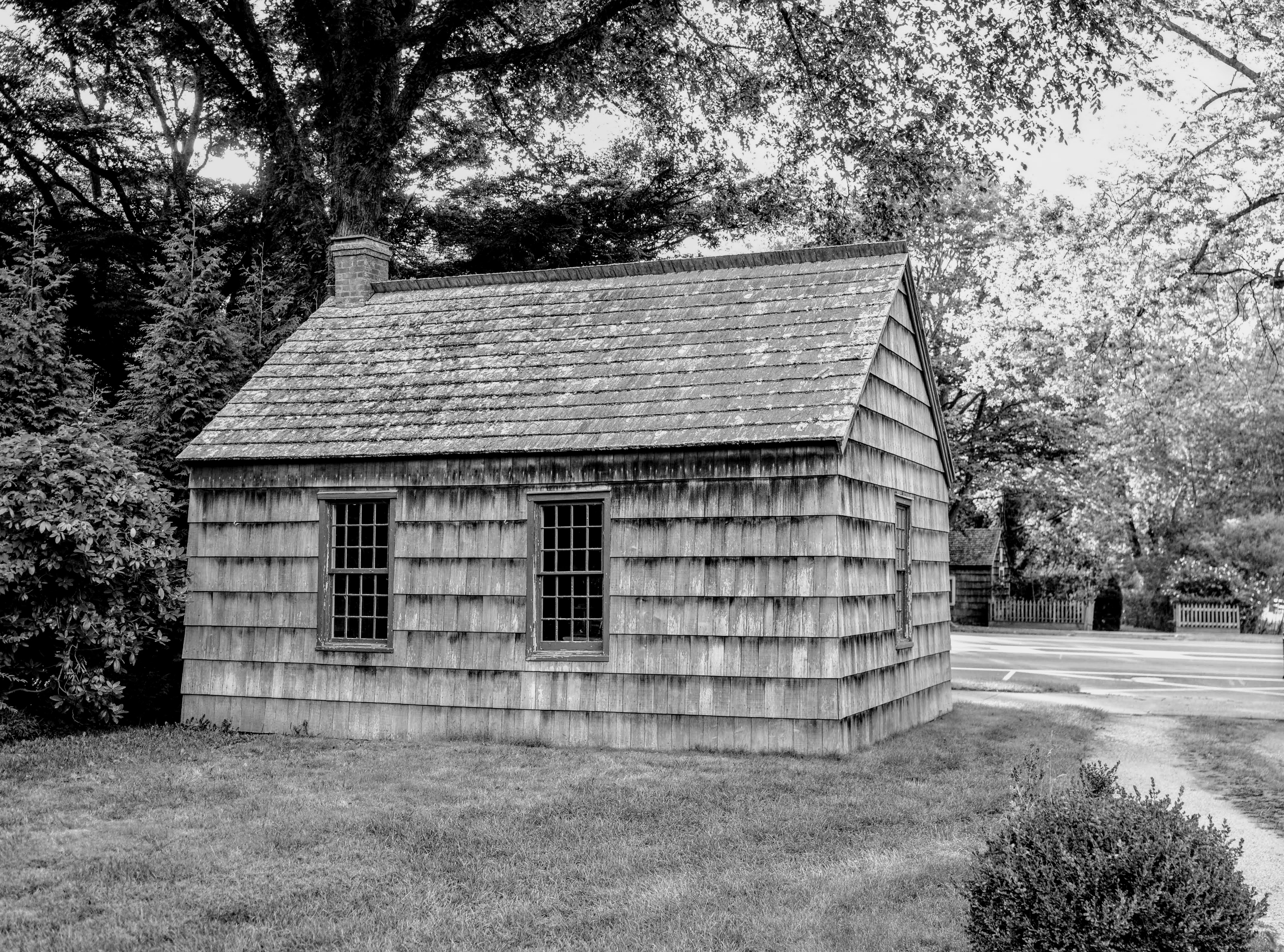
Town school house, rear view

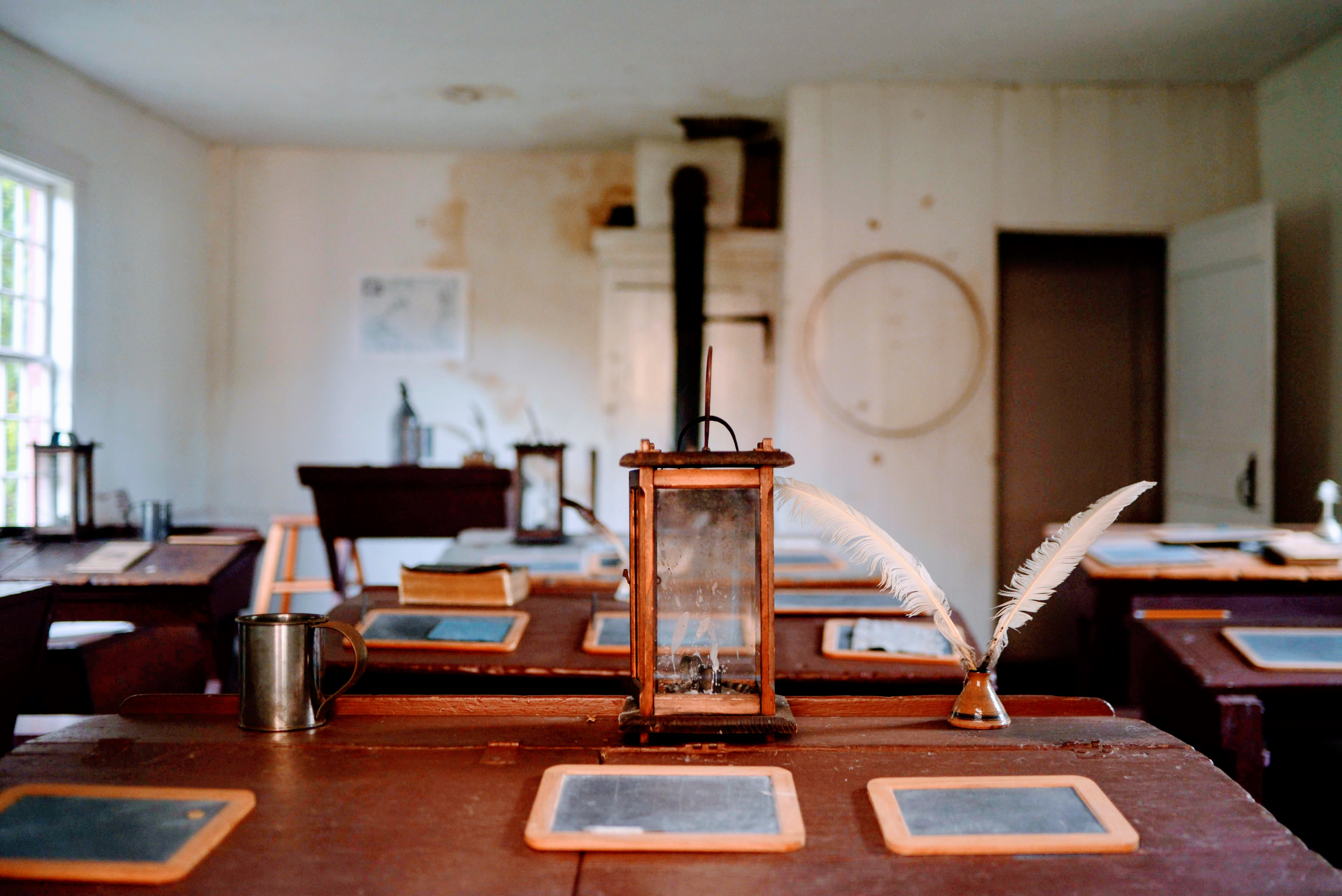
Contributing property, desk with quill 02
