= Frances Latham =

Ancestor of many Rhode Island governors and deputy governors

- Born: baptized 15 February 1609/10; Kempston, Bedfordshire, England
- Died: September 1677; Newport, Rhode Island
- Resting place: Common Burying Ground
- Other names: Frances Dungan; Frances Clarke; Frances Vaughan
- Occupations: Colonial wife and "Mother of Governors"
- Spouse(s): (1) William Dungan (2) Jeremy Clarke (3) Rev. William Vaughan
- Children: (surname Dungan): Barbara, William, Frances, Thomas; (surname Clarke): Walter, Mary, Jeremiah, Latham, Weston, James, Sarah
- Parent(s): Lewis and Elizabeth Latham

Frances Latham (1610–1677), was a colonial American woman who settled in Rhode Island, and is known as "the Mother of Governors." Having been widowed twice, she had three husbands, and became the ancestor of at least ten governors and three deputy/lieutenant governors, and is related by marriage to an additional six governors and one deputy governor.

Born in Bedfordshire, England, she was the daughter of Lewis Latham, a falconer for King Charles I. She was first married to William Dungan, with whom she had four children. Dungan died at an early age, and she soon married Jeremy Clarke who brought her and her Dungan children to New England where they settled in Portsmouth, Rhode Island. Clarke was a prominent merchant who became the President of the colony for a year. With Clarke, Frances had seven children, the oldest of whom, Walter, later became a governor of the colony.

Jeremy Clarke died when all of his children were still minors, after which Frances married her third husband, the Reverend William Vaughan of Newport. Frances and her last husband both died at about the same time in 1677 in Newport, and Frances was buried in the Common Burying Ground there. She leaves a legacy of thousands of descendants, many of whom reached great prominence during their lives.

== Life ==
Baptized in Kempston, Bedfordshire, England on 15 February 1609/10, Frances Latham was the daughter of Lewis Latham and his wife Elizabeth. Her father, born about 1584 in Elstow, Bedfordshire, was a Sergeant Falconer under King Charles I.

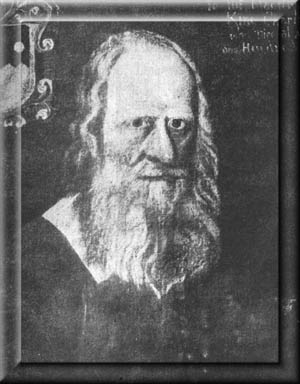
Lewis Latham, father of Frances

Frances' first husband was William Dungan, who was a perfumer living in the parish of St Martin-in-the-Fields, now a part of London. With Dungan she had four children, but he died in 1636, being buried at St Martin-in-the-Fields on 20 September of that year, leaving a will with Frances as executrix, and naming each of his four minor children. Within two years she was remarried, this time to Jeremy Clarke of London, a nephew of Richard Weston, 1st Earl of Portland. Soon thereafter the couple immigrated to New England with Frances' four young children, and in 1638 Jeremy was admitted as an inhabitant of Aquidneck Island (Portsmouth) in what soon became the Colony of Rhode Island and Providence Plantations. Following turmoil in the government of the island in 1639, her husband was one of the nine signatories of an agreement to form the settlement of Newport at the south end of the island. He held a number of important positions in the town and colonial government, and in 1648 became President of the entire colony, serving for a year in this role. Clarke died in January 1652, with his death being recorded later in the Friends' (Quaker) records. He was buried in the "tomb that stands by the street by the water side in Newport," now lost, but his governor's grave medallion is in the Clifton Burying Ground where several Quaker Rhode Island colonial governors were later buried.

About a year after her second husband's death, her father, Lewis Latham, also died, leaving Frances a small legacy in his will. Frances was again a widow with many young children, and within a few years she had married her third husband, the Reverend William Vaughan of Newport. The time of her marriage to Vaughan was before January 1656 when she made an agreement with her oldest Clarke son, Walter, through his guardians, John Cranston and James Barker, settling inheritance issues, now that she was no longer widowed. Vaughan had been ordained in 1648 as a member of the First Baptist Church of Newport, but in 1656 he and others formed the Second Baptist Church. He was a highly respected citizen of Newport, so much so that in April 1676, during King Philip's War, he was one of 16 colonial leaders whose counsel was requested by the General Assembly during "these troublesome times and straits." Others named in this request for counsel were former governor Benedict Arnold, former President Gregory Dexter, and future deputy governor James Barker.

Frances died in 1677, at about the same time that her husband died. In September of that year Samuel Hubbard of Newport wrote to his children in Westerly, "For news, Mr. Vahan is gone to his long home and his wife is like to follow him if not dead." Frances was buried in the Common Burying Ground in Newport, and on her stone was placed the following inscription, "Here Lyeth ye Body of Mrs. Frances Vaughan, Alius Clarke, ye mother of ye only children of Capt'n Jeremiah Clarke. She died ye 1 week in Sept., 1677, in ye 67th year of her age."

== Family and legacy ==
Late 19th-century genealogist John Osborne Austin proposed that Frances had first been married to a "Lord Weston" as a teenager, but strong evidence against this was presented by New Haven genealogist Louise Tracy in 1908. Frances had 11 children by her first and second husbands, and leaves behind numerous descendants, many of them prominent. Her oldest daughter, Barbara Dungan, married James Barker, who served as deputy governor of the colony. Her second daughter, Frances Dungan, married Randall Holden, a signer of the Portsmouth Compact, and one of the founding settlers of the town of Warwick. Descendants through this daughter include William Greene, an early governor of Rhode Island shortly after the Revolutionary War, his son, Honorable Ray Greene, and his grandson William Greene, a lieutenant governor of the state.

Her oldest Clarke child, Walter, served for more than 20 years as deputy governor of the colony, and also served several years as the governor. Her daughter, Mary Clarke, married John Cranston, another governor of the colony, and they were parents of the longest-serving Rhode Island governor, Samuel Cranston. Frances' son Weston Clarke married Mary Easton who was a granddaughter of two other governors, John Coggeshall and Nicholas Easton Her son, Latham Clarke, married Hannah Wilbur, the daughter of Samuel Wilbur, Jr. who was one of seven purchasers of the Pettaquamscutt lands, and who was also mentioned in Rhode Island's Royal Charter of 1663. Her youngest child, Sarah Clarke, married colonial governor Caleb Carr as her second husband.

Other Rhode Island governors who are direct descendants of Frances include Nehemiah R. Knight, Henry Lippitt, Charles C. Van Zandt, Charles W. Lippitt, John Chafee, and Lincoln Chafee, as well as a governor of the state of Washington, John R. Rogers. Additional deputy or lieutenant governors that descend from her are Rhode Island's John Gardner and Samuel G. Arnold, while another Rhode Island governor related to her by marriage is William Wanton.

A small book about Rhode Island history through the eyes of Frances, The True Story of Frances, the Falconer's Daughter, was published in 1932.

Besides governors, other prominent individuals descend from Frances, including Rhode Island Attorney General Daniel Updike, Rhode Island congressman Tristam Burges and American Revolutionary War Colonels Christopher Lippitt and Christopher Greene, as well as Major General Benedict Arnold. Additional descendants are American explorer Meriwether Lewis, slave Underground Railroad activist Catherine Coffin, U.S. Army Corps Topographical Engineer Major Howard Stansbury, Kansas abolitionist John Brown, abolitionist Susan B. Anthony, writers Julia Ward Howe and Edgar Allan Poe, British Navy Vice Admiral Sir Jahleel Brenton and American astronaut Roger Chaffee, baseball sports legend Walter Johnson, rodeo champion and cowboy artist Earl W. Bascom, western artist and Wyoming cowgirl Minerva Teichert, art professor and muralist Lee Greene Richards, Utah mining magnate Jesse Knight, Canadian cattle baron and rodeo champion Ray Knight, Utah politician Inez K. Allen, poet Lula Greene Richards, Nevada cattle rancher Cliven Bundy and his son Ammon Bundy, silent era cowboy movie star and rodeo champion Art Acord, writer and cartoonist James Thurber, and entertainers Marilyn Monroe, Lucille Ball, Ken Curtis, Bill Paxton and Karen Carpenter, as well as entertainer and creator of the Muppets, Jim Henson.

== "Mother of Governors" ==
The following governors, deputy governors, or lieutenant governors either descend directly from Frances, or married one of her descendants:

Governors who are direct descendants:

- Walter Clarke, her son, Rhode Island governor 1676-1677, 1686, and 1696-1698
- Samuel Cranston, Rhode Island governor 1698-1729
- William Greene, Jr., Rhode Island governor 1778-1785
- Nehemiah R. Knight, Rhode Island governor 1817-1821
- Henry Lippitt, Rhode Island governor 1875-1877
- Charles W. Lippitt, Rhode Island governor 1895-1896
- John R. Rogers, Washington governor 1896-1902
- Goodwin Knight, California governor 1953-1959
- Marvin Griffin (1907-1982), 72nd Georgia governor 1955-1959
- John Chafee, Rhode Island governor 1963-1969
- Sarah Palin, 9th Alaska governor 2003-2004
- Lincoln Chafee, Rhode Island governor 2011-2015

Deputy or lieutenant governors who are direct descendants:

- John Gardner, Rhode Island deputy governor 1754-1755 and 1756-1764
- Samuel G. Arnold, Rhode Island lieutenant governor 1852-1853 and 1861-1862
- William Greene, Rhode Island lieutenant governor 1866-1868
- Theodore F. Green Rhode Island lieutenant governor 1933-1937
- Goodwin Knight, California lieutenant governor 1946-1953
- Marvin Griffin (1907-1982), Georgia lieutenant governor 1948-1955

Governors who are related by marriage:

- Jeremy Clarke, her husband, Rhode Island president 1648-1649
- John Cranston, Rhode Island governor 1678-1680
- Caleb Carr, Rhode Island governor in 1695
- William Wanton, Rhode Island governor 1732-1733
- William Greene Sr., Rhode Island governor for 11 years from 1743-1758
- Charles C. Van Zandt, Rhode Island governor 1877-1880

Deputy governor related by marriage:

- James Barker, Rhode Island deputy governor 1678-1679

== See also ==
- List of early settlers of Rhode Island
- Colony of Rhode Island and Providence Plantations
