= Henry Bull (governor) =

English colonist in North America (1610–1694)

12th and 14th Governor of the Colony of Rhode Island and Providence Plantations
- In office 1685–1686
- Preceded by: William Coddington, Jr.
- Succeeded by: Walter Clarke
- In office 1690–1690
- Preceded by: Edmund Andros under Dominion of New England
- Succeeded by: John Easton

Personal details
- Born: 1610
- Died: 22 January 1693/4; Newport, Colony of Rhode Island and Providence Plantations
- Resting place: Coddington Cemetery, Newport
- Spouse(s): (1) Elizabeth _______ (2) Esther Allen (3) Ann (Clayton) Easton
- Children: Jireh, Amy
- Occupation: Corporal, Sergeant, Deputy, Assistant, Governor

Coat of Arms of Henry Bull

Henry Bull (1610–1694) was a governor of the English Colony of Rhode Island and Providence Plantations, serving for two separate terms, one before and one after the three year period when the English colonies in the region were merged into an administrative union named Dominion of New England. Sailing from England as a young man, Bull first settled in Roxbury in the Massachusetts Bay Colony, but soon became a follower of the dissident ministers John Wheelwright and Anne Hutchinson, and was excommunicated from the Roxbury church. With many other followers of Hutchinson, he helped found the settlement of Portsmouth, on Aquidneck Island in the Narragansett Bay. Within a year of arriving there, he and others followed William Coddington to the south end of the island where they established the settlement of Newport.

Bull was a corporal and sergeant on the island, and kept the prison for the colony. He also built a house shortly after his arrival that continued to stand in Newport for nearly three centuries, until destroyed by fire. Late in life, Bull became active in the service of the colony, fulfilling roles as commissioner, deputy, and assistant. In 1685, during a chaotic period in Rhode Island's history when the colony was being accused of irregularities, and its charter was being threatened under a new King, the 75-year-old Henry Bull stepped into the office of governor, serving for a year. Soon after he left office, Edmund Andros was appointed royal governor of all the New England colonies until another change in England's monarchy resulted in Rhode Island's return to its former charter. Uncertainty prevailed in the colony, and two other individuals refused to serve as governor, until Bull, as an octogenarian, once again assumed the governorship in 1690, returning Rhode Island to its previous form of government under its charter.

Considered to be as fearless as he was honest, Bull was elected to the highest position in the gift of the colony, despite the fact that he could not sign his name (he used a mark for his signature in the Portsmouth Compact). He became a Quaker after his arrival in the Colony of Rhode Island. He is buried in the Coddington Cemetery in Newport, where several other Quaker governors of the colony were also interred.

== Massachusetts ==
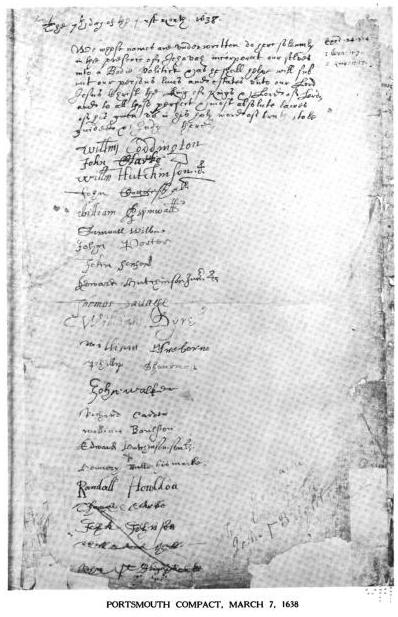
Portsmouth Compact; Bull's name appears 18th on the list, signed with a mark

Sailing from London at the age of 25, aboard the ship James in 1635, Henry Bull first settled in Roxbury in the Massachusetts Bay Colony. Bicknell states that Bull had come from South Wales, but Anderson, in reviewing the evidence, offers no support to this assertion. Bull was made a member of the Roxbury Church in late 1635, and in the church records he was called "a man servant" who "lived honestly for a good season, but on the sudden (being weak & affectionate) he was taken & transported with the opinion of familism" for which he was excommunicated. On 20 November 1637 he was among many Boston men who were disarmed as supporters of the dissident minister John Wheelwright. While still in Boston on 7 March 1637/8, he was one of 23 men who signed an agreement to form a Christian-based government, affixing his mark to the document since he could not sign his name. Five days later he was licensed to depart Massachusetts with William Coddington, John Coggeshall and others. Roger Williams suggested that this group of Anne Hutchinson supporters purchase land of the Indians along the Narragansett Bay, which they did, settling on Aquidneck Island and establishing the settlement of Pocasset, later named Portsmouth.

== Rhode Island ==
On 27 June 1638 Bull was present at a general meeting held at Pocasset, and during this year he was chosen to the military post of corporal of the Train Band. The following winter he was selected as Sergeant, with one of his jobs being to keep the prison. At the same time it was ordered that the prison construction be completed, and that it sit adjacent to or nearby the house of Henry Bull. In April 1639 there was dissension within the new government at Pocasset, and a group of nine men, including Bull, signed a compact, and then moved to the south end of the island to establish the town of Newport. Within this group of men, William Coddington was listed as "judge," and the other eight men were termed "elders." Once at Newport, Bull was elected Sergeant for the two years from 1640 to 1642, and became a freeman in 1641. Bull built a house in Newport which ultimately stood for nearly three centuries, before being destroyed in a 1912 fire. It was depicted in Field's book about Rhode Island at the end of the 19th century.

Many years elapsed before Bull was once again found in the public record, and in 1655 he became a Commissioner, which position he held for two years. In 1663 he and his son Jireh sold 43 acres of land on Conanicut Island (later Jamestown, Rhode Island) to Caleb Carr. Bull had become a member of the Religious Society of Friends, better known as Quakers, and in 1665 the Friends' records of Portsmouth state that Bull's wife, Elizabeth, died on the first day of October that year. Shortly thereafter, Bull went to Sandwich, Massachusetts where he married his second wife, Esther Allen.

=== Governorships ===
Once in his middle age, Bull became more active in the service of the colony, and in 1666 was elected Deputy to the General Assembly for a year, and then held that position again in 1672 for two years, and again in 1680 for a year. In 1671 he was a juryman, and in 1674 he was selected as an Assistant for a year. With the death of King Charles II in England, the ascension of James II brought about some frightful changes to the New England colonies. At the meeting of the General Assembly in May 1685 Governor Coddington was absent, but was re-elected to the governorship. When contacted, Coddington refused to serve, and the 75-year-old Henry Bull, "a man who afterwards proved himself to be as fearless as he was honest," was then chosen governor, with Walter Clarke chosen as his deputy. The loss of the colony's freedoms began to appear when Edward Randolph urged the Board of Trade to revoke the charters of both Rhode Island and Connecticut because of alleged irregularities. In October 1685 Joseph Dudley was appointed to govern the colonies of Massachusetts, New Hampshire, Maine, and King's Province, the latter in the Narragansett country (later Washington County, Rhode Island), and Randolph was made secretary of his council.

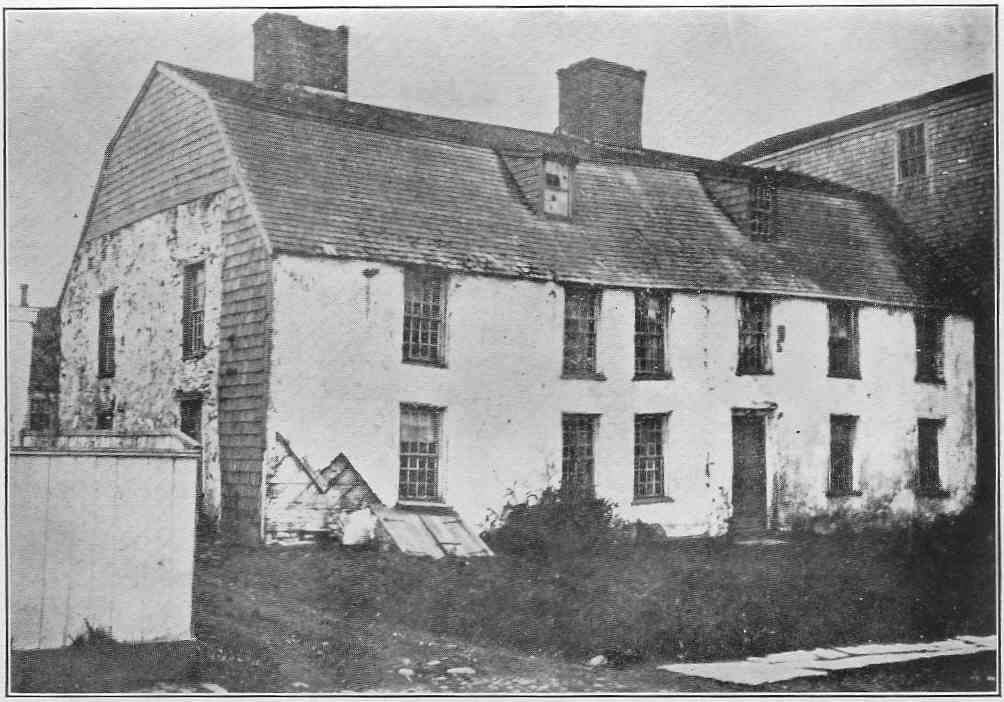
Henry Bull House in 1880

At the election of May 1686, Walter Clarke was chosen governor of the colony, but served only a few weeks before the Dominion of New England was imposed on the northern colonies, and Edmund Andros was appointed as the royal governor. Andros ruled for nearly three years, when in April 1689 news of the ascension of William III and Mary II to the English throne arrived in Boston, and Andros and Randolph were both arrested. Clarke called the freemen of the Rhode Island colony together for an election in Newport in May 1689, but wary of the implications of serving at this time, he refused the position, and for ten months Rhode Island was without an acknowledged governor. The October meeting of the General Assembly was poorly attended due to a storm, and it wasn't until February 1690 that they met again. Clarke once again refused to assume the governorship, and Christopher Almy was elected in his place, but also declined. Then, wrote Arnold, quoting historian Bancroft "all eyes turned to one of the old Antinomian exiles, the more than octogenarian, Henry Bull; and the fearless Quaker, true to the light within, employed the last glimmerings of life to restore the democratic charter of Rhode Island."

At the meeting of the Assembly in May 1690 Bull was once again elected to the office of governor, but this time the ancient administrator declined. John Easton, son of the former governor, Nicholas Easton, became governor, serving for the next five years. During the winter of 1693/4, the Friends' records contained the following entry, "Henry Bull, aged about eighty-four years; he departed this life at his own house in Newport (he being the last man of the first settlers of this Rhode Island) ye 22d 11mo 1693-4 [22 January 1693/4]." He is buried in the Coddington Cemetery on Farewell Street in Newport, where Quaker Governors William Coddington, William Coddington, Jr., Nicholas Easton, John Easton and John Wanton are also buried.

== Family ==
Following the death of his second wife, Bull married Ann Easton, the widow of former colonial Governor Nicholas Easton. Bull's grandson, Jireh (son of Jireh) married Godsgift Arnold, the daughter of Governor Benedict Arnold. His granddaughter Mary Bull, and his grandson, Ephraim Bull, both married grandchildren of early colonial President John Coggeshall, and his grandson, Henry Bull, married a granddaughter of William and Anne Hutchinson. One of his distant descendants is William T. Bull, a college football coach and physician.

== See also ==
- List of colonial governors of Rhode Island
- List of early settlers of Rhode Island
- Colony of Rhode Island and Providence Plantations
