= Samuel Cranston =

Rhode Island colonial governor

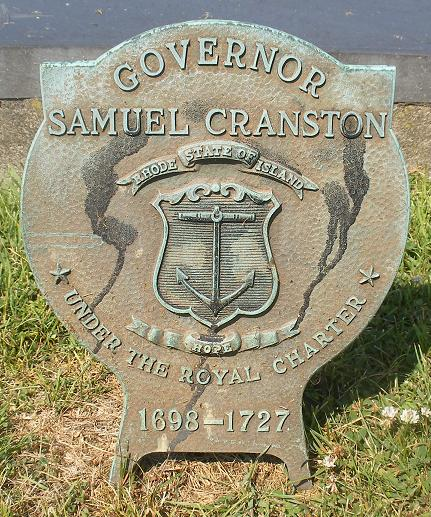
- Samuel Cranston grave medallion

18th Governor of the Colony of Rhode Island and Providence Plantations
- In office 1698–1727
- Preceded by: Walter Clarke
- Succeeded by: Joseph Jenckes

Personal details
- Born: August 1659 Newport, Rhode Island
- Died: April 26, 1727 (aged 67) Newport, Rhode Island
- Resting place: Common Burial Ground, Newport
- Spouse(s): (1) Mary Hart (2) Judith (Parrott) Cranston
- Occupation: Goldsmith, Assistant, Major, Governor

Samuel Cranston (1659–1727) was a governor of the Colony of Rhode Island and Providence Plantations during the first quarter of the 18th century. He held office from 1698 to 1727, being elected to office 30 times (twice in 1698) and served as governor longer than any other individual in the history of both the colony and the state of Rhode Island. The son of former Rhode Island Governor John Cranston, he was born in Newport and lived there his entire life. Going to sea as a young man, he was captured by pirates, and held captive for several years before returning to his family.

Cranston had very little political experience when he was first elected as governor of the colony upon the resignation of Walter Clarke in March 1698. The issues that he dealt with during his first three years in office were so critical, that the continued existence of the Rhode Island colony was at stake. One of the major issues of his early tenure was that of piracy, as many privateers who were active in the recent war with France turned to piracy. The crown wanted piracy stopped, while many colonists were sympathetic to the pirates, and Cranston had to make difficult political decisions to satisfy the home country on this issue. Another ongoing issue was the disputed boundary between the Rhode Island and Connecticut colonies. The Narragansett country was given to both colonies by their respective charters, creating many decades of friction. During Cranston's tenure as governor, the dispute was finally ended, entirely in Rhode Island's favor.

The most formidable issue facing the colony began in 1698 with the arrival of Lord Bellomont as Governor of New York, Massachusetts, and New Hampshire. Bellomont took an immediate dislike to the governance of Rhode Island, documenting numerous irregularities in the way it operated, and sending copious documentation to the Board of Trade in England. Bellomont wanted the Rhode Island colony to be removed from its charter, and put under closer royal supervision. He would likely have been successful in his quest, had he not died in 1701.

Following Cranston's decisiveness and firmness during the first three years of his tenure, he became extremely popular with the people of the colony, and while virtually every other politician of his era fell by the wayside, he was able to stand the political upheavals of his day, continuing to be elected as governor every year until his death in 1727. His first wife was Mary Hart, a granddaughter of Roger Williams, and his second wife was the widow of his younger brother, Caleb. Cranston is buried in the Common Burying Ground in Newport, and shares a large marker with his father.

== Early life ==
Coat of Arms of Samuel Cranston

The son of former Rhode Island Governor John Cranston, Cranston was born in Newport in the Colony of Rhode Island and Providence Plantations, and lived there his entire life. His mother was Mary Clarke, the daughter of an early colonial President, Jeremiah Clarke. The oldest of ten children, he was educated as a youth, and became a merchant as a young adult, with his trade being that of a goldsmith.

In 1684, at the age of 24, Cranston became a freeman from Newport. Bicknell relates an interesting personal experience Cranston had as a young man. After he was married, he went to sea and was captured by pirates and not heard from for many years. Thinking he was dead, his wife arranged to marry a Mr. Russell of Boston. Cranston managed to gain his freedom and made his way back to Newport, arriving the evening of his wife's wedding. He found his wife before the marriage ceremony, and the event was turned into a celebration for his return, with the groom-to-be surrendering his expected bride with good grace.

Cranston was in his late 30s when he began his political career, becoming an Assistant in 1696. Two years later, in 1698, he was chosen as Major for the militia of the island (Portsmouth and Newport), and the same year, with virtually no political experience, he was selected as governor for the colony, when his brother-in-law, Walter Clarke, resigned from that position.

== Governorship ==
=== Piracy ===
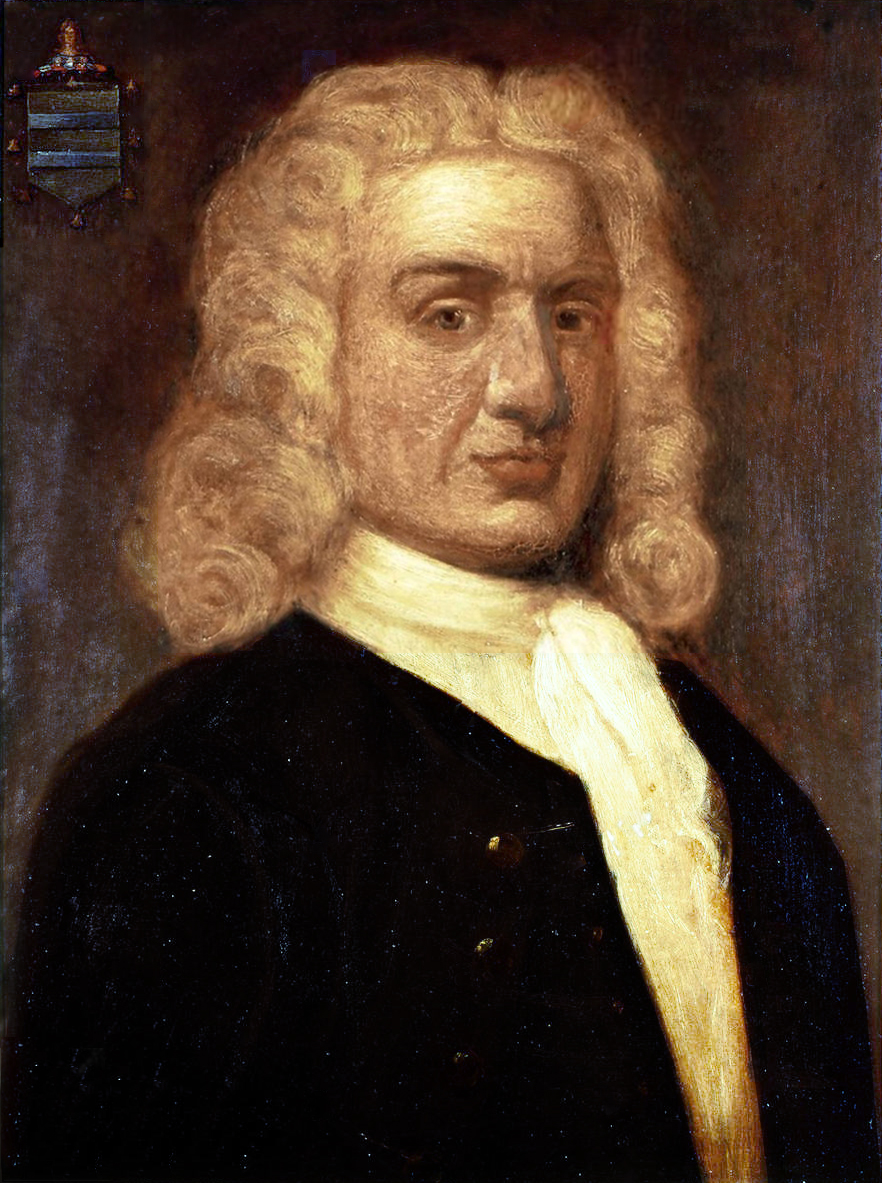
Captain William Kidd, privateer turned pirate, whom all colonial governors were directed to seize if found

Elected as governor for the first time in March 1698 upon Clarke's resignation, Cranston was elected again two months later at the May meeting of the General Assembly, and re-elected every May thereafter through 1726, for a total of 30 times being elected to the highest office in the colony. One of the first acts of the new administration was to deal with the serious issue of piracy, which had sprung from the licensed privateering that the colonies had fostered during the recent war with France. These privateers, with roving commissions against the French had become open pirates after peace was attained. All of New England, New York, and the West Indies were deeply involved in these unlawful enterprises. The Act of 1698 prohibited piracy, had all improperly gained property confiscated, and punished the offenders.

An address to the King was prepared confessing the remissness of the colony in respect to the acts of trade, and mentioning the new statute concerning the act of piracy. That the colony assumed admiralty jurisdiction during the late war was admitted and defended on the ground of expediency because of the need to annoy French commerce, and the fact that there was then no Admiralty Court established in the colony. The letter concluded with the request for royal favor in allowing the colony to continue under its charter. This letter and other papers were enclosed with a letter from Cranston to the Board of Trade apologizing for irregularities of the colony in refusing the quota of troops for New York, and explaining charges against it in regards to piracy. He also stated that two men suspected of piracy would be brought to trial.

A bitter letter against the government of the colony was soon after written by "that old enemy of New England," Edward Randolph, the Surveyor General of Customs, who had just been to New York to welcome the arrival of its new governor, Lord Bellomont. The charges against the Rhode Island colony were most serious, including complicity with pirates, by whom many were enriched; the letter also wrongly suggested that many of the people desired a royal governor and would pay £500 a year for his support.

At the October 1698 session of the General Assembly, provision was made for the reception of Lord Bellomont, who was expected soon from New York on his way to Boston. A commission was named to prepare a digest of laws to send to England, and another commission was formed to present the issue of the colony's western boundary with Connecticut to Bellomont. At the same time, additional letters were sent by the Board of Trade in England to the colonies on the subject of piracy. Rhode Island's agent in England, Jaleel Brenton (son of Governor William Brenton), asked that all privateering papers be sent to England, with an account of the trials of some of the pirates. Letters from England gave instructions to the custom house officers on how to conduct their business and included an order from the British Cabinet to the governors of all the colonies to apprehend the notorious Captain Kidd should he appear in their waters.

=== Irregularities in the colony's affairs ===
In December 1698 the Board of Trade made a formal representation to the King concerning the many irregularities of the Rhode Island colony, specifically charging it with refusal to take oaths, encouraging illegal traffic, assuming admiralty jurisdiction to themselves and resisting it from the crown, and other flagrant acts of disloyalty. They went on to recommend that a commission of inquiry be sent to Lord Bellomont to examine these matters with the view to issuing a quo warranto against Rhode Island's charter. Also, the board made inquiries of Mr. Brenton, then in London, about the extraordinary militia power of the colony, to which he replied that it had been conferred by the charter, but that the Assembly recently gave to the militia the power to select its own officers.

In May 1699 Brenton informed the colony of actions taken by the government of Connecticut, which now claimed a great part of Warwick and Providence as well as all of the Narragansett country under the jurisdiction of King's Province. Cranston wrote a long letter to the Board of Trade, deprecating the many false reports against the Rhode Island colony that were mostly circulated by Randolph. At the same time, Lord Bellomont, who remained in New York for a year, moved to Boston. He was afflicted with gout, which, Arnold wrote, "seems to have affected his temper to the detriment of Rhode Island interests."

=== Lord Bellomont, enemy of Rhode Island ===
Bellomont's purpose at this time was to break up the piracy that had grown out of privateering, an extremely difficult task, as many of the leading families in both New York and New England were involved in it. He succeeded in enticing Captain Kidd to come to Boston, where he was seized and imprisoned. Kidd had many friends in Rhode Island and Massachusetts, and the state of affairs in the colonies was such that some pirates were allowed to escape from incarceration. With the many letters that Bellomont sent home this year were nearly 100 documents in support of the charges against the Rhode Island colony. To further his designs upon Rhode Island, and to aid in securing other pirates known to resort there, Bellemont commissioned the three members of the Admiralty Court, Brinley, Sanford and Coddington, to collect evidence and use their efforts to capture some of Kidd's confederates. They accepted the trust, but deplored the difficulties because of sympathy felt everywhere for the freebooters.

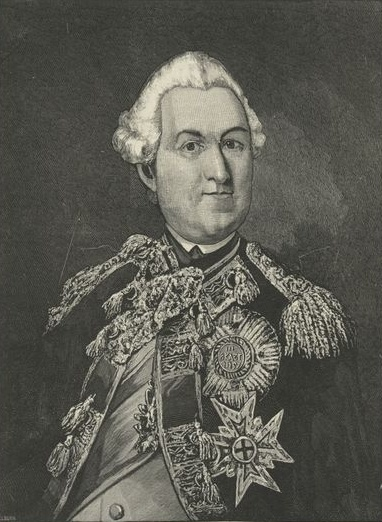
Lord Bellomont was bent on removing Rhode Island from its chartered government for "irregularites."

The feeling of the home government was expressed in a letter of August 1699 written by the Board of Trade in reply to a letter written by Cranston in May. The language was very severe, blaming the colony for sending only an abstract of the laws when a full copy was required, and sharply rebuking them for their encouragement of piracy, citing privateer commissions granted by Deputy Governor John Greene in 1694. The urgency of these affairs led Cranston to call a special session of the Assembly in Newport in August in which were discussed the pending visit of Bellomont to Rhode Island along with funding for the visit, the boundary issue with Connecticut, and the need for funds to hire another agent to join Brenton in England to defend the colony against the attacks of its enemies.

Bellomont left a diary of his visit to Rhode Island and its proceedings. On the first day he was met at Bristol ferry by Cranston and a troop of horse, and escorted to Newport where a meeting of the council was held, and the royal commission read. The next day Bellomont's instructions to inquire into the mal-administration of Rhode Island's affairs were read to the council, and former Rhode Island governors Walter Clarke and John Easton were examined upon several points charged, as were Cranston, Greene and Peleg Sanford. The troublesome subject of oaths was minutely examined—the scruples of many in Rhode Island upon this subject (particularly Quakers) was incomprehensible to the English officers. Governor Winthrop of Connecticut arrived with his commissioners to discuss the Narragansett dispute. The conflicting clauses in both colonies' charters were read, as was the earlier agreement between John Clarke and the first Governor Winthrop. The case was argued on both sides, but no mutual agreement could be reached. Bellomont ordered each side to prepare a statement of their claims along with affidavits and then to send their agents to England to place the matter before the King.

Further examinations in regards to piracy continued to evolve. Caleb and Josias Arnold (both sons of Governor Benedict Arnold) were added as members of the Admiralty Court as commissioners to collect evidence upon piracy charges, and the governor and his council were requested to aid them in their work. Bellomont, having finished his business in Rhode Island placed the governors of Rhode Island and Connecticut under bonds of £3000 each to enforce the acts against pirates, and later wrote Cranston with thanks for his hospitality, and for directing the arrest of a pirate who had escaped to Rhode Island. An acceptable copy of the laws and acts of council of the colony was requested, a task not easy to perform in the disordered state of the records, but Cranston, in his reply, promised it would be done. In November 1699 depositions in regard to pirates were taken and forwarded to England by Lord Bellomont, with a letter denouncing the government of Rhode Island as "the most irregular and illegal in their administration that ever any English government was." His criticisms were amply sustained by the complaints constantly sent to him by the admiralty commissioners at Newport. Sanford claimed that any commission from his Majesty was considered an infringement of the charter privileges, and those who took them were looked upon as enemies of the state.

At length, Bellomont, having collected a massive set of evidence to support charges against Rhode Island, made his report to the Privy Council. It was a formidable document, presenting, under 25 distinct headings, an array of testimony against the Rhode Island colony "which we can only wonder...that the friendless colony was enabled to resist," wrote Arnold. He continued, "That she was not utterly crushed beneath the cumulative evidence of every kind of irregularity that was hurled upon her by the indefatigable zeal and the consummate ability of Bellomont, can scarcely be accounted for by any human agency. It is the greatest marvel in the history of Rhode Island in the seventeenth century. She had had many narrow escapes, but this was the most wonderful of them all." Immediately following this report, Bellomont sent a letter to the Board of Trade on the subject of piracy, denouncing Cranston for "conniving at pirates, and making Rhode Island their sanctuary." In a separate issue, he also directed that taxes not be collected in the Narragansett country until the dispute with Connecticut had been resolved. The best way for the Assembly to act on this prohibition was to ignore it. However, some people in Westerly refused to elect tax assessors for the tax to send an agent to England. Upon news of this, Cranston issued a warrant for the arrest of several persons who had signed a protest against the said election, and appointed a special constable with a sufficient force to serve the warrant. Arnold writes, "The firmness of Cranston at this crisis, did more than any other one cause to save the colony from extinction."

In December 1699 a fair copy of the laws and acts of the colony was finally sent to Bellomont, with a letter explaining the delay. Captain Joseph Sheffield, one of the Assistants, carried the letter with the purpose of being an envoy to soothe the anger of the Earl. The reply from the commissioners the next day declared that the copy of the laws was neither complete nor correct, and condemned the arrests made at Westerly. The colony's laws were sent to the Board of Trade with abundant annotations and denunciations by Bellomont. The Board of Trade, upon receipt of Bellomont's report, sent an abstract to the King in April 1700, recommending that the law officers of the crown consider what would be most proper for bringing the colony under a better form of government. At the May elections in 1700, John Greene, who had been deputy governor for ten years, was dropped, and former Governor Walter Clarke was chosen in his place. At the close of the Assembly Cranston addressed a petition to the King imploring the continuance of the charter. He also wrote the Board of Trade informing them that the late deputy governor had been left out of all offices of trust at the recent election on account of his illegally granting privateer commissions several years earlier. He also added that a more perfect copy of the laws was to be made, and that a new form of engagement had just been adopted to meet the views of the home government. It was a well drafted and diplomatic letter designed to aid the efforts of Brenton in averting another quo warranto.

The Earl of Bellomont was ready with a rejoinder, sustained by documentary proof. He wrote to the Board that he had given up all attempts at reducing the disorders in Rhode Island, and he forwarded papers relating to the seizure and trial of the Westerly prisoners. Then in March 1701 an event of the greatest importance to the people of Rhode Island occurred. The death of the Earl of Bellomont at New York removed the most formidable opponent to the charter of Rhode Island who had ever ruled in New England. "Unlike Sir Edmund Andros," Arnold wrote, "Bellomont could neither be moved by flattery nor softened by courtesy." He "rebuked the free spirit of a people who virtually set at defiance the laws that he was appointed to execute."

=== Mid tenure issues ===
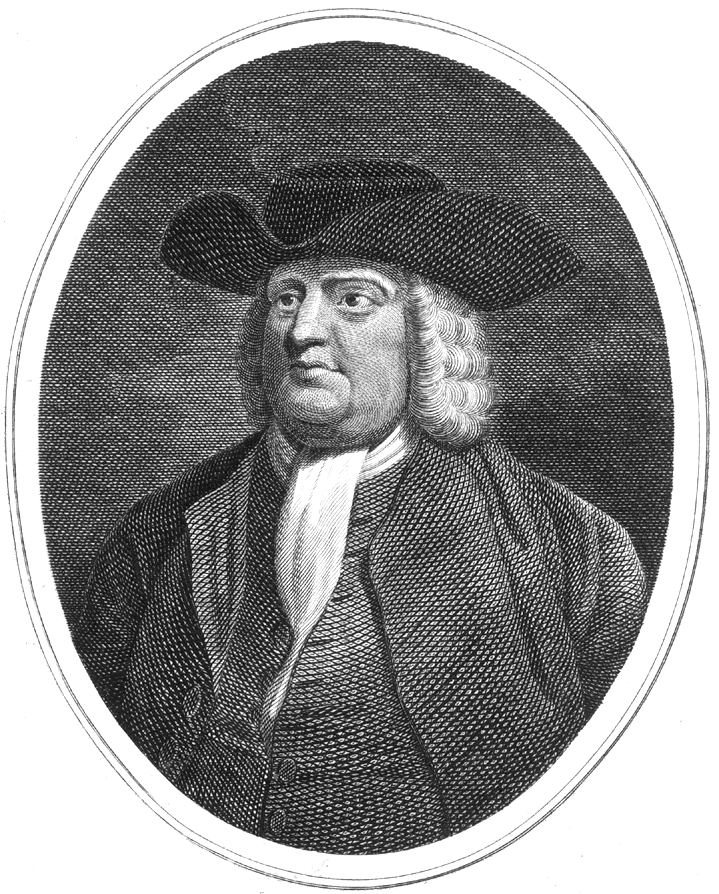
William Penn interceded on behalf of Rhode Island, allowing that it should retain its charter despite recommendations of the Board of Trade and Joseph Dudley

In 1702 the General Assembly ordered that a fortification be built at Newport with 12 pieces of ordnance. The same year, Governor Joseph Dudley of Massachusetts visited Newport, claiming to act under the authority of the King and Queen as "Captain-General of all forces, forts, and places of strength." He demanded a review of the colonial militia, which was denied by Governor Cranston. By the same authority, Dudley claimed admiralty jurisdiction over the Rhode Island colony, which was also denied, but was later granted by order of the new sovereign in England, Queen Anne. The ambitious designs of Dudley to overthrow the charter of Rhode Island were supported by the English Board of Trade, which recognized him as Governor of the Rhode Island colony. Fortunately for the colony, the great influence of William Penn with Queen Anne and her Privy Council kept this from happening.

In 1703 the boundary line between the Rhode Island and Connecticut colonies, in dispute for more than half a century, was agreed upon as the same line given in Rhode Island's charter, and as it would stand during statehood. The colony was divided into two counties—Rhode Island encompassing the islands in the Narragansett Bay and Block Island, and Providence Plantations, including all of the land west of the bay.

In 1702, Royal African Company (RAC), which had previously enjoyed a monopoly on the slave trade, had it revoked; this allowed for Rhode Island–based merchants to directly engage in slave trading themselves. Despite this, Rhode Island obtained most of its slaves from Barbados, receiving roughly 25 per year at a cost of approximately £35 each. In 1708, a duty of £3 was placed on every slave imported into the colony. The first general census of the colony took place in 1708 when 7,181 inhabitants were tallied, including 1,015 freeholders, 426 slaves, and 56 indentured servants. The militia force consisted of 1,362 males from the ages of 16 to 60, each required to have a musket, sword or bayonet, powder and shot.

=== Hard vs soft money ===
To meet the extraordinary expenses of outfitting men and transports for the colony's use during the current French and Indian War, known as Queen Anne's War, an act was passed in July 1710 for the issue of bills of credit in the amount of £5,000. While supported by the farmers, this policy had a detrimental effect on the merchants, best summarized by historian Samuel G. Arnold, "Thus commenced in Rhode Island a system of paper money issues fraught with disaster to the commercial interests of the Colony, whose baleful influence was to extend over nearly a century, distracting alike the political, financial, and even the social condition of the people, and which was to be the occasion of most bitter partisan strife long after the Revolutionary War had left us an independent State."

Cranston, who had approved the first paper money issue was called to "repeat the folly again and again." This policy led to the creation of two parties, the specie, or hard-money party, and the paper-money party. This division caused a major turnover in the election of May 1714, when the hard-money party triumphed, and only six out of 28 Deputies returned to the General Assembly. The following election in May 1715 was even more dramatic, and called the "great revolution." Deputy Governor Henry Tew was deposed, and replaced by Joseph Jenckes of Providence, and every Assistant but one was replaced, and only 5 of 28 Deputies were returned to office. Cranston was able to weather the storm, being considered too able and being too respected by both parties to be removed from office.

=== Late tenure events ===
Queen Anne's War had ended in 1713 with the Treaty of Utrecht, restoring peace to the world, and beginning a new era for Rhode Island. The intense theological debates and dogmas were replaced with discussions of business, politics, trade, and finance.

A variety of legislation was enacted during the final ten years of Cranston's time in office. In 1718 a new and complete militia law was enacted in which the Governor was declared the "Captain-General and Commander in Chief." The following year saw the first edition of the laws of Rhode Island printed in Boston. In 1723 the first almshouse in Rhode Island was erected in Newport, and in 1725 the mainland towns were empowered to build a house of correction for vagrants and "mad persons," the first reference to a reformatory and philanthropic institution.

== Family, death and legacy ==
Cranston married first Mary Hart, the daughter of Thomas Hart and Freeborn Williams, and the granddaughter of Providence founder Roger Williams, with whom he had seven children. The year after Mary's death in 1710, Cranston married Judith (Parrott) Cranston, the widow of his younger brother Caleb.

Cranston died on April 26, 1727, in Newport, while still in office. He was buried in the Common Burial Ground in Newport, beside his father. A large and elaborate slate slab contains an inscription for himself and for his father, with a coat-of-arms in the middle of the top. He also has a governor's medallion in front of his grave.

Rhode Island historian Samuel G. Arnold wrote of him, "The administration of Governor Cranston is remarkable for many reasons. He held his position probably longer than any other man who has ever been subjected to the test of an annual popular election. He was thirty times successively chosen governor, holding office till his death, in 1726 [1727]. His great firmness in seasons of unexampled trial, that occurred in the early part of his public life, is, perhaps, the key to his wonderful popularity..."

== Ancestry of Samuel and Mary Cranston ==
Ancestors of Samuel Cranston

16. John Cranston
8. Rev. James Cranston
4. John Cranston (1625 - 1680)
2. Samuel Cranston (1659 - 1727)
20. William Clarke
10. Jeremy Clarke (1605 - 1652)
21. Mary Weston
5. Mary Clarke (1641 - 1711)
22. Lewis Latham
11. Frances Latham (1611 - 1677)
1. Children of Samuel and Mary Cranston
12. Edward Hart
6. Thomas Hart (died 1671)
13. Margaret (died after 1671)
3. Mary Hart (1663 - 1710)
28. James Williams (died 1621)
14. Roger Williams (c. 1606 - 1683)
29. Alice Pemberton (1565 - 1634)
7. Freeborn Williams (1635 - 1710)
30. Rev. Richard Barnard
15. Mary Barnard (1609 - after 1676)

== See also ==
- William May, Richard Want, Joseph Faro, Thomas Tew, and Peter Lawrence - some of the privateers who turned pirate, whom Cranston was accused of supporting
- List of colonial governors of Rhode Island
- List of lieutenant governors of Rhode Island
- Colony of Rhode Island and Providence Plantations

Political offices
Preceded by Walter Clarke	Colonial Governor of Rhode Island; 1698–1727	Succeeded by Joseph Jenckes
