= Governor Clark =

Governor Clark or Clarke may refer to:

- Alonzo M. Clark (1868–1952), 16th Governor of Wyoming
- Alured Clarke (1745–1832), Governor of Jamaica from 1784 to 1790
- Andrew Clarke (British Army officer, born 1824) (1824–1902), 9th Governor of Straits Settlements from 1873 to 1875
- Andrew Clarke (British Army officer, born 1793) (1793–1847), Governor of Western Australia from 1846 to 1847
- Barzilla W. Clark (1880–1943), 16th Governor of Idaho
- Charles Clark (governor) (1811–1877), 24th Governor of Mississippi
- Sir Charles Clarke, 3rd Baronet (1839–1932), Governor of Malta from 1903 to 1907
- Chase A. Clark (1883–1966), 18th Governor of Idaho, brother of Barzilla W. Clark
- Edward Clark (governor) (1815–1880), 8th Governor of Texas
- George Clarke (governor) (1676–1760), Acting Governor of the Province of New York from 1736 to 1743
- George Clarke, 1st Baron Sydenham of Combe (1848–1933), Governor of Victoria from 1901 to 1903 and Governor of Bombay from 1907 to 1913
- George W. Clarke (Iowa politician) (1852–1936), 21st Governor of Iowa
- Henry Toole Clark (1808–1874), 36th Governor of North Carolina
- James Clark (Kentucky politician) (1779–1839), 13th Governor of Kentucky
- James Clarke (Iowa politician) (1812–1850), 3rd Governor of Iowa Territory
- James Paul Clarke (1854–1916), 18th Governor of Arkansas
- Jeremy Clarke (governor) (1605–1652), Governor of the Colony of Rhode Island and Providence Plantations in 1644
- John Clark (Delaware governor) (1761–1821), 20th Governor of Delaware
- John Clark (Georgia governor) (1766–1832), 31st Governor of Georgia
- Laura Clarke (fl. 2010s), Governor of the Pitcairn Islands since 2018
- Myron H. Clark (1806–1892), 19th Governor of New York
- Walter Eli Clark (1869–1950), 1st Governor of Alaska Territory
- William Clark (1770–1838), 4th Governor of Missouri Territory
- Walter Clarke (governor) (1640–1714), 6th, 13th and 17th Governor of the Colony of Rhode Island and Providence Plantations from 1676 to 1677, 1686, and 1696 to 1698
