= Governor Carr =

Governor Carr may refer to:

- Caleb Carr (governor) (1616–1695), 16th Governor of the Colony of Rhode Island and Providence Plantations from 1695 to 1695
- Elias Carr (1839–1900), 48th Governor of North Carolina
- Ralph Lawrence Carr (1887–1950), 29th Governor of Colorado
