= John Greene Jr. =

Deputy governor of the Colony of Rhode Island (1620–1708)

14th Deputy Governor of the Colony of Rhode Island and Providence Plantations
- In office 1690–1700
- Governor: John Easton; Caleb Carr; Walter Clarke; Samuel Cranston
- Preceded by: John Coggeshall Jr.
- Succeeded by: Walter Clarke

4th Attorney General of Rhode Island
- In office May 1657 – May 1660
- Governor: Benedict Arnold
- Preceded by: John Easton
- Succeeded by: John Easton

Personal details
- Born: baptized 15 August 1620 Salisbury, Wiltshire, England
- Died: 27 November 1708 Warwick, Rhode Island
- Resting place: Spring Greene Cemetery, Warwick
- Spouse: Ann Almy
- Children: 11
- Parent(s): John Greene Sr. Joan Tattersall
- Occupation: Commissioner, General Recorder, General Solicitor, Attorney General, Warden, Deputy, Deputy Governor

John Greene Jr. (1620 – 27 November 1708) was a deputy governor of the Colony of Rhode Island and Providence Plantations who spent almost his entire adult life in the public service of the colony.

== Early life ==
Greene was born in Salisbury, England, and baptized at St. Thomas' Church on 15 August 1620. He was the son of John Greene Sr. (1558–1659) and Joan (née Tattersall) Greene (1598–1643), and sailed to New England with his parents in 1635 aboard the ship James. His father, after coming from Massachusetts to Providence, became one of the original settlers of Warwick.

== Career ==
In 1652 Greene served in his first public role as a commissioner from Warwick, and served in some public capacity every year until 1690 when he was first chosen as deputy governor of the colony. From 1652 to 1663, he was Representative to the General Court (later known as the Supreme Court), Deputy in 1664, 1674, 1677, 1680, Assistant from 1660 to 1690, Warden for Warwick in 1658, General Recorder (precursor to Secretary of State) from 1652 to 1654, General Solicitor in 1655, and Attorney General from 1657 to 1660.

Greene served ten consecutive one-year terms in this capacity, retiring from public service in 1700 at the age of 80. He was one of the 10 Assistants named in the Royal Charter of 1663, which would become the basis for Rhode Island's government for nearly two centuries. During the devastating events of King Phillips War, Greene was one of 16 prominent inhabitants of the colony whose counsel was sought by the General Assembly.

== Personal life ==
In 1648 Greene was married to Ann Agnes Almy in East Greenwich, Rhode Island. Anne was the daughter of William Almy and Audry (née Barlow) Almy. Together, they had eleven children, including:

- Deborah Greene (1649–1728), who married William Torrey, son of William Torrey, who both immigrated to America in 1640.
- William Green (1653–1680), who married Mary Sayles, daughter of John Sayles and granddaughter of Roger Williams, in 1674. After his death she married John Holmes.
- Peter Greene (1654–1723), who married Elizabeth Arnold, daughter of Stephen Arnold.
- Job Greene (1656–1745), who married Phebe Sayles, another daughter of John Sayles, in 1684.
- Phillipa Greene (1658–1706), who married Caleb Carr, nephew of Caleb Carr. After his death in 1690, she married Charles Dickinson.
- Richard Greene (1660–1711), who married Elinor Sayles, another daughter of John Sayles, in 1692.
- Catherine Greene (1665–1753), who married Charles Holden, son of Randall Holden, in 1688.
- Audora "Audrey" Greene (1667–1733), who married Speaker John Spencer, son of Dr. John Spencer.
- Samuel Greene (1671–1720), who married Mary Gorton, a granddaughter of colonial president Samuel Gorton.

Greene died in Warwick on 27 November 1708.

=== Descendants ===
Through his youngest son Samuel, he was a grandfather of William Greene Sr., who served for 11 one-year terms as a governor of the colony, and a great-grandfather of William Greene Jr., who was a governor of the State of Rhode Island.

Greene is also an ancestor of United States President Warren G. Harding, as well as inventor Thomas A. Edison, Canadian politician and religious leader Nathan Eldon Tanner, cowboy artist and inventor Earl W. Bascom and Hollywood actor John Wayne.

== See also ==
- William Greene (colonial governor) for ancestral chart
- List of lieutenant governors of Rhode Island
- Colony of Rhode Island and Providence Plantations

== Images ==
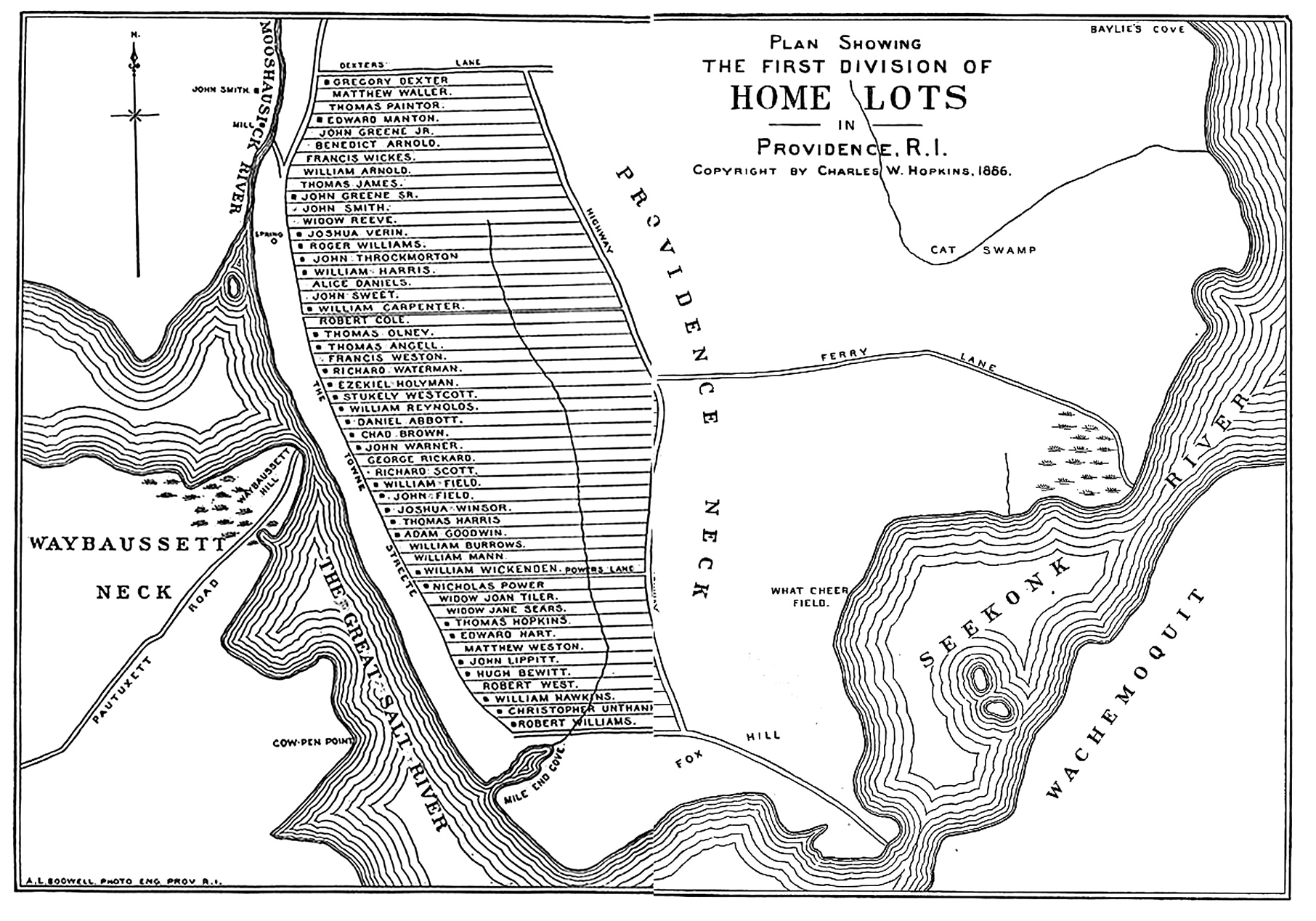
Town layout of Providence with Greene's lot fifth from the top

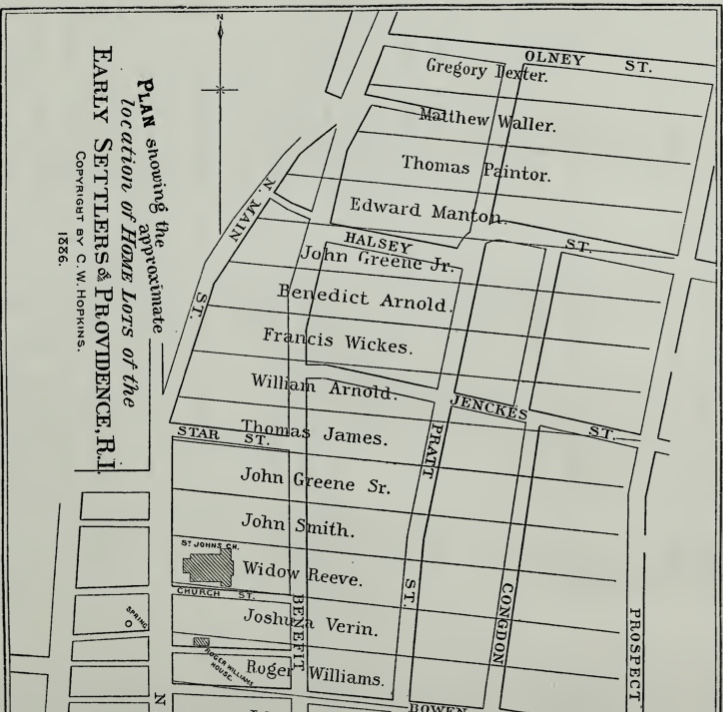
Detail showing Green's lot overlaid on current streets

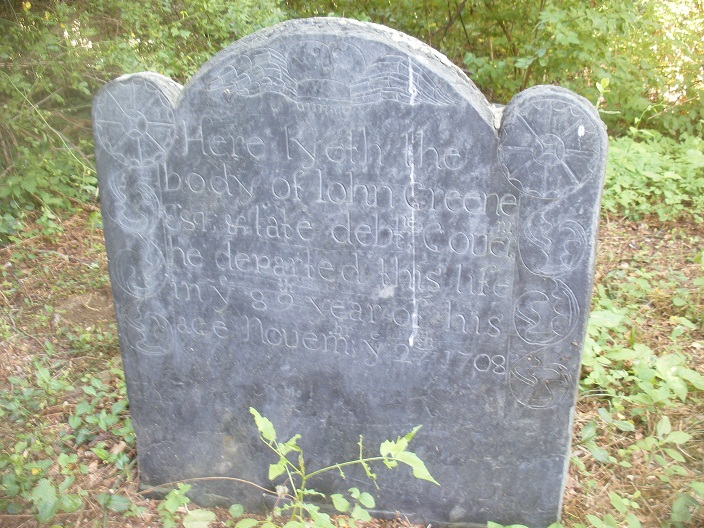
Greene's tombstone, Spring Greene Cemetery, Warwick
