= John Coggeshall Jr. =

Rhode Island colonial deputy governor

- Coat of arms

12th and 13th Deputy Governor of the Colony of Rhode Island and Providence Plantations
- In office 1686–1686
- Governor: Walter Clarke
- Preceded by: Walter Clarke
- Succeeded by: none under the Dominion of New England
- In office 1689–1690
- Governor: Henry Bull
- Preceded by: none under the Dominion of New England
- Succeeded by: John Greene Jr.

Personal details
- Born: c. 1624 Essex, England
- Died: 1 October 1708 Newport, Rhode Island
- Resting place: Coggeshall Cemetery, Newport
- Spouse(s): (1) Elizabeth Baulstone (2) Patience Throckmorton (3) Mary (Hedge) Sturgis
- Occupation: Commissioner, Assistant, General Treasurer, Deputy, Major for the Island, Deputy Governor

John Coggeshall Jr. (c. 1624 - 1 October 1708) was a deputy governor of the Colony of Rhode Island and Providence Plantations.

== Early life ==
The son of Rhode Island President John Coggeshall Sr., he was raised in the village of Castle Hedingham in northeastern Essex where his father was a merchant. Aged about eight, he sailed from England with his parents and surviving siblings, arriving in New England in 1632.

== Career ==
He was first active in civil affairs in 1653 when he became treasurer of the island towns of Portsmouth and Newport. The following year brought the re-unification of the colony, with the island towns rejoining the government with Providence and Warwick, and he served as treasurer of the four towns for a year. His name appears on a list of Newport freemen in 1655, and for the following 35 years he served almost continuously in one or multiple roles including Assistant, General Treasurer, Deputy, General Recorder, and Major for the Island.

He was one of ten Assistants named in the Royal Charter of 1663, which would become the basis for Rhode Island's government for nearly two centuries. In 1686 he became the Deputy Governor under Governor Walter Clarke, but his term lasted only a month when the English crown assigned Edmund Andros to be Governor of all the New England colonies under the Dominion of New England. Following the demise of this dominion and the arrest of Andros in 1689, Coggeshall was once again selected as Deputy Governor for the year ending in May 1690, serving under Governor Henry Bull.

In April 1676, during King Philip's War, he was on a committee to procure boats for the colony's defense. Later that year, in August, he was a member of a court martial for the trial of several Indians.

== Personal life ==
Coggeshall had 16 children with three different wives. In 1647 he married his first wife, Elizabeth Baulston, the daughter of magistrate William Baulston, and this marriage ended in a divorce which was granted by the Assembly in 1655. Elizabeth then married Thomas Gould, and Coggeshall was married later that year to Patience Throckmorton. This marriage produced nine children and lasted until her death in 1676, after which he married a wife named Mary (née Hedge) Sturgis, with whom he had four more children. Coggeshall wrote a will in June 1708, and died on 1 October of that year.

== See also ==
- List of lieutenant governors of Rhode Island
- List of colonial governors of Rhode Island
- Colony of Rhode Island and Providence Plantations
