= Walter Clarke (governor) =

English colonist in North America (1640–1714)

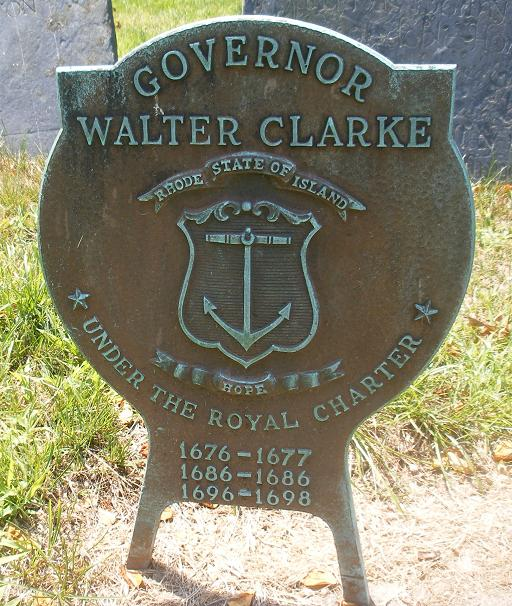
- Walter Clarke grave medallion

6th, 13th and 17th Governor of the Colony of Rhode Island and Providence Plantations
- In office 1676–1677
- Preceded by: William Coddington
- Succeeded by: Benedict Arnold
- In office 1686–1686
- Preceded by: Henry Bull
- Succeeded by: Edmund Andros under the Dominion of New England
- In office 1696–1698
- Preceded by: Caleb Carr
- Succeeded by: Samuel Cranston

11th and 15th Deputy Governor of the Colony of Rhode Island and Providence Plantations
- In office 1679–1686
- Governor: John Cranston; Peleg Sanford; William Coddington, Jr. Henry Bull
- Preceded by: James Barker
- Succeeded by: John Coggeshall, Jr.
- In office 1700–1714
- Governor: Samuel Cranston
- Preceded by: John Greene, Jr.
- Succeeded by: Henry Tew

Personal details
- Born: 1640 Newport, Colony of Rhode Island and Providence Plantations
- Died: May 23, 1714 (aged 73–74) Newport, Colony of Rhode Island and Providence Plantations
- Resting place: Clifton Burying Ground, Newport
- Spouse(s): Content Greenman (m. 1660; died 1665) Hannah Scott (m. 1666; died 1681) Freeborn (Williams) Hart (m. 1681; died 1710) Sarah (Prior) Gould (m. 1710)
- Children: 8
- Occupation: Deputy, assistant, deputy governor, governor

Walter Clarke (1640–1714) was an early governor of the English Colony of Rhode Island and Providence Plantations and the first native-born governor of the colony. The son of colonial President Jeremy Clarke, he was a Quaker like his father. His mother was Frances (Latham) Clarke, who is often called "the Mother of Governors." While in his late 20s, he was elected as a deputy from Newport, and in 1673 was elected to his first of three consecutive terms as assistant. During King Philip's War, he was elected to his first term as governor of the colony. He served for one year in this role, dealing with the devastation of the war, and with the predatory demands of neighboring colonies on Rhode Island territory during the aftermath of the war.

While voted out of office in 1677 by the "War Party," he was soon back in office as deputy governor, serving continuously in this capacity from 1679 to 1686, until once again being elected governor. His time in office was very short, because the new English king, James II put most of the American colonies under a single royal governor, Edmund Andros, and Rhode Island fell under the Dominion of New England for three years. The flight of King James II to France in 1689, and the subsequent ouster of Andros from New England, brought about the restoration of Rhode Island's government under the Royal Charter of 1663, but Clarke refused to serve as governor. Eventually, following the death of Governor Caleb Carr in 1695, Clarke once again accepted the governorship.

His final two years as governor were marred with jurisdictional issues from the crown, and following the threat of impeachment, he resigned as governor in the spring of 1698, being succeeded by his nephew, Samuel Cranston. Always with public service in his heart, he nevertheless became deputy governor of the colony in 1700, and served in this capacity every year until his death in 1714.

Clarke had a total of four wives, the second of whom was a niece of Anne Hutchinson and the third of whom was a daughter of Roger Williams. Two of his sisters married colonial Rhode Island governors.

== Early life ==
Born in Newport on Aquidneck Island (later Rhode Island), Walter Clarke was the son of colonial President Jeremy Clarke and his wife Frances Latham. His father was an early Quaker settler of the colony, and he became a Quaker himself. In 1667 Clarke was elected as a Deputy to the General Assembly from Newport, launching a public career that would span nearly half a century. He was again elected Deputy in 1670, 1672, and 1673, and then was chosen as an Assistant for three years from 1673 to 1676. Under the Royal Charter of 1663, the freemen of the colony elected a governor, deputy governor, ten assistants, and a number of deputies from each town, the entire body being called the General Assembly. Eventually, the House of Deputies became the Lower House of the legislature, and the Assistants became the Upper House (Senate). The Assembly met twice a year, in May and October, and also acted as the judiciary for the colony, in conjunction with the governor and deputy governor. The biggest concern of the colony during Clarke's tenure as deputy or assistant was depredation of Rhode Island's territory by the neighboring colonies, particularly Massachusetts and Connecticut.

== Governorships ==
In 1676, during the devastation of King Philip's War, Clarke was elected governor of the colony. Most of the settlers on the mainland (Providence and Warwick) fled to Aquidneck Island where Newport and Portsmouth were located. A flotilla of sloops, or gunboats, each with five or six men, sailed constantly around the island to ward off possible attackers. The mainland settlements were largely destroyed, including most houses and fields for crops. Since the Rhode Island colony was about half Quaker during this timeframe, a 1673 law was enacted exempting men from military duty if bearing arms was against their consciences. During the war the act was repealed in May 1676, but it was re-enacted six months later at the October meeting of the General Assembly. Also during this October session, a letter of remonstrance was sent to the Connecticut colony concerning claims in the Narragansett country. In May 1677 the "War Party" won most of the seats in the General Assembly, and Benedict Arnold was elected governor. Clarke stepped down from power for two years, but in 1679 he was elected deputy governor, and served in that role continuously until 1686, when he was once again elected governor.

=== Dominion of New England ===
The death of King Charles II in 1685 brought James II to the English throne, with a new policy in regards to the American colonies. Edward Randolph was sent to America to establish a temporary government over the colonies until a permanent government could be established. Joseph Dudley and his council held court at Narragansett in June 1686, making the territory, named King's Province, independent of any colony. Edmund Andros was appointed the royal governor over all of the New England colonies under the Dominion of New England, and when the May 1686 General Assembly adjourned in June, it would not reconvene again for nearly four years. To keep from losing all legislative power, the Rhode Islanders placed this power in the individual towns, thus maintaining much of the colony's liberties during the rule of Andros.

When Andros took power in the Rhode Island colony, he had seven counselors, of whom Clarke was one. When the royal governor came to Newport to take possession of the colony's Royal Charter, Clarke had shrewdly sent the document to his brother's with instructions to not tell him where it was. One favorable outcome of the Andros' regime was the eventual return to Rhode Island of the formerly disputed Narragansett country claimed by Humphrey Atherton and his company. In 1689 King James fled to France, after which William III and Mary II ascended to the throne of England. Andros was ousted from New England, and the Royal Charter of 1663 once again became the governing document of the Rhode Island colony.

=== Final terms as governor ===
Following the ouster of Andros as Rhode Island's governor, Clarke refused to resume as the governor of the colony, reading a paper before the Assembly disclaiming the present government, and Henry Bull was elected in his place. His position changed several years later, however, when in December 1695 Governor Caleb Carr died in office, and Clarke was chosen as governor in his place, probably during an extra session of the General Assembly held in January 1696, though there is no record of such a meeting. A plot to assassinate England's Protestant King William III was revealed, and the colonies were preparing for an invasion by France. Governor Fletcher of New York wrote Clarke for a quota of men which had not been provided by his predecessor. The Assembly replied with a letter explaining that the Rhode Island colony had a long coastline and was very exposed and under-defended by forts, and could not possibly offer assistance.

The Treaty of Ryswick restored peace to Europe, and orders were sent to the colonies to suspend all privateers against the French. The orders reached New England in December 1697 and Mr. Jaleel Brenton (son of Governor William Brenton) returned from England to the Rhode Island colony and delivered them to the General Assembly at a special session held in Newport. Brenton was also empowered to administer the oath required by the acts of trade, but Clarke, being a Quaker, refused to take the oath. Clarke was further annoyed by the creation of a Court of Admiralty in Rhode Island. Brenton brought a commission to Peleg Sanford as the Judge of Admiralty, but Clarke endeavored to persuade the Assembly to oppose it, and kept the commission from Sanford. Brenton then advised the impeachment of Clarke, and also urged that Rhode Island's laws be put in print, which had never been done. These issues together prompted Clarke to resign as governor, and it is likely that his nephew, Samuel Cranston, presided as governor during the May 1698 meeting of the Assembly, when he was elected for his first of many terms. Clarke would not cease his public service, however, and in 1700 was elected as deputy governor under Cranston, and was continuously elected to that office each year until his death. He died on May 23, 1714, in Newport, and was buried in the Clifton Burying Ground.

== Family ==
Clarke was married four times, and had eight known children. He was first married about 1660 to Content Greenman, the daughter of John Greenman, and a year after her death in 1666 he married Hannah Scott, the daughter of Richard Scott and Catharine Marbury. Catharine was a sister of the famous dissident minister, Anne (Marbury) Hutchinson. With his first wife, Clarke had three children, and with his second he had five more. Following the death of his second wife in 1681 he married Freeborn Hart, the widow of Thomas Hart, and the daughter of Providence founder Roger Williams. Following her death in 1710 Clarke married a fourth time, to Sarah Gould, the widow of John Gould, and the daughter of Matthew and Mary Prior. Clarke's oldest sister, Mary, married first John Cranston who was a colonial governor, and whose son, Samuel Cranston, succeeded Clarke as governor following his last term. Clarke's youngest sister, Sarah, married as her second husband, Governor Caleb Carr who preceded Clarke as governor in 1695.

== In popular culture ==
In July 1682, he was visiting Great Island, New Hampshire with Arthur Cook and Matthew Borden where they were witnesses to the Lithobolia, or stone-throwing devil. Their testimony was recorded by Richard Chamberlain, the New Hampshire provincial secretary.

== See also ==
- List of colonial governors of Rhode Island
- List of lieutenant governors of Rhode Island
- Colony of Rhode Island and Providence Plantations
