= Henry Tew =

16th Deputy Governor of the Colony of Rhode Island and Providence Plantations
- In office 1714–1715
- Governor: Samuel Cranston
- Preceded by: Walter Clarke
- Succeeded by: Joseph Jenckes

Personal details
- Born: 1654 Newport, Rhode Island
- Died: 26 April 1718 (aged 63–64) Newport, Rhode Island
- Spouse(s): (1) Dorcas _______ (2) Sarah _________
- Occupation: Assistant, Deputy, Major for the Island, Deputy Governor

Henry Tew (1654 - 26 Apr 1718) was a deputy governor of the Colony of Rhode Island and Providence Plantations. He was the son of Richard and Mary (Clarke) Tew who arrived in New England in 1640, and the grandson of Henry Tew of Maidford, Northamptonshire, England. From 1680 to 1698 he served continuously as Deputy from Newport, and during most of the years from 1703 to 1712 he served as Assistant. He was on many committees during his life, one of the later ones being to advise Governor Cranston on matters concerning the expedition against Canada. In 1714 he succeeded the late Walter Clarke as Deputy Governor, serving for a single year. Tew wrote his will on 20 April 1718, dying six days later. He was married twice, having nine children by his first wife, and nine by his second. He and both wives are buried in a family burial ground half a mile north of Sachuest Beach, in Middletown, Rhode Island. There is some evidence that Tew was the brother of the privateer and pirate, Thomas Tew.

== See also ==
- List of lieutenant governors of Rhode Island
- List of colonial governors of Rhode Island
- Colony of Rhode Island and Providence Plantations

== Bibliography ==
- Austin, John Osborne (1887). Genealogical Dictionary of Rhode Island. Albany, New York: J. Munsell's Sons. ISBN 978-0-8063-0006-1.
