= Nicholas Easton =

President and governor of Rhode Island (c.1593–1675)

4th and 8th President of the Colony of Rhode Island and Providence Plantations
- In office 1650–1651
- Preceded by: John Smith
- Succeeded by: Samuel Gorton (as President of Providence and Warwick)
- In office 1654–1654
- Preceded by: Gregory Dexter (as President of Providence and Warwick) and John Sanford as governor of Newport and Portsmouth
- Succeeded by: Roger Williams

4th Governor of the Colony of Rhode Island and Providence Plantations
- In office 1672–1674
- Preceded by: Benedict Arnold
- Succeeded by: William Coddington

2nd and 4th Deputy Governor of the Colony of Rhode Island and Providence Plantations
- In office 1666–1669
- Governor: William Brenton
- Preceded by: William Brenton
- Succeeded by: John Clarke
- In office 1670–1671
- Governor: Benedict Arnold
- Preceded by: John Clarke
- Succeeded by: John Clarke

Personal details
- Born: c.1593 Hampshire, England
- Died: 15 August 1675 Newport, Rhode Island
- Resting place: Coddington Cemetery, Newport
- Spouse(s): (1) Mary Kent (2) Christian (_______)(Cooper) Beecher (3) Ann Clayton
- Children: Peter, John, James, Elizabeth
- Occupation: Tanner, assistant, president, commissioner, governor

Nicholas Easton (c. 1593–1675) was an early colonial President and Governor of Rhode Island. Born in Hampshire, England, he lived in the towns of Lymington and Romsey before immigrating to New England with his two sons in 1634. Once in the New World, he lived in the Massachusetts Bay Colony towns of Ipswich, Newbury, and Hampton. Easton supported the dissident ministers John Wheelwright and Anne Hutchinson during the Antinomian Controversy, and was disarmed in 1637, and then banished from the Massachusetts colony the following year. Along with many other Hutchinson supporters, he settled in Portsmouth on Aquidneck Island, later a part of the Colony of Rhode Island and Providence Plantations. He was in Portsmouth for about a year when he and eight others signed an agreement to create a plantation elsewhere on the island, establishing the town of Newport.

In Newport, Rhode Island, Easton became active in civil affairs, serving as assistant to the governor for several years, and in 1650 was elected President of the four towns of the colony. During this time the colony was very fragile, and its authority was frequently usurped by its much larger neighbors, the Massachusetts Bay Colony and the Plymouth Colony. Following his first presidency, the colony was split in 1651 by William Coddington who wanted the two island towns to be under a separate government, and who went to England to get the authority to do this. In 1654 the four towns were reunited, and Easton was once again elected president, presiding for another year over the united colony.

During the last ten years of his life, Easton was very active in civil matters, serving as Deputy to the General Assembly, Deputy Governor, and then two years as Governor of the colony, which had been strengthened by the Royal Charter of 1663. Easton was a tanner by trade, and also a minister of sorts, being criticized by Massachusetts magistrate John Winthrop for his theological opinions. He became a Quaker, and after a long life was buried in a Friends' Cemetery, the Coddington Cemetery in Newport next to his second of three wives. Easton's Beach and Easton's Point in Newport are named for him. His younger son, John Easton, later became Governor of the colony.

== Early life ==
Born in Lymington, Hampshire, England, Nicholas Easton was the son of John and Elizabeth Easton, and was still living in Lymington in 1616. His father died when he was very young, after which his mother married John Burrard. As a teenager his stepfather died, and his mother then married William Dollinge. While Easton's father and first stepfather both worked at the salt works in Lymington, he became a tanner instead. He may have married in Lymington, but very soon thereafter he lived in Romsey where all four of his children were baptized, and where his two younger children were buried. His first wife, Mary Kent, was the mother of all of his children. She died in 1630, shortly after the birth and death of their fourth child, and in March 1634 Easton and his two surviving sons boarded the Mary & John at Southampton for passage to New England.

== Massachusetts ==
Easton's first residence in New England was the settlement of Ipswich where he was admitted to the church sometime before September 1634, and where he was appointed as overseer of powder and shot that month. His stay there was short, for in the spring of 1635 he was among the founding settlers of Agawam, later called Newbury, Massachusetts. During the Antinomian Controversy from 1636 to 1638, Easton became a supporter of the dissident ministers John Wheelwright and Anne Hutchinson, and on 20 November 1637 he and many other followers of these preachers, were disarmed, being ordered to deliver their guns, pistols, swords, shot, etc. to the authorities. He then went to Hampton where he built the town's first house on the north bank of the Merrimack River. Massachusetts authorities continued to pursue followers of Wheelwright and Hutchinson, and in March 1638 Easton was ordered to appear at the next court if he had not left the Massachusetts Bay Colony. Departing shortly thereafter, he joined many other followers of Hutchinson in Portsmouth on Aquidneck Island, also called Rhode Island from which the colony and state would later derive their names. In May 1638 he was allotted six acres in Portsmouth on the north side of Great Cove.

== Rhode Island ==
Easton was apparently a minister of sorts in his own right, and aroused the ire of the Massachusetts magistrate John Winthrop who wrote in 1638, "Those who were gone with Mrs. Hutchinson to Aquiday [Aquidneck Island] fell into new errors daily. One Nicholas Easton, a tanner, taught that gifts and graces were that antichrist mentioned Thes[salonians]., and that which withheld, &c, was the preaching of the law, and that every of the elect had the Holy Ghost and also the devil in dwelling."

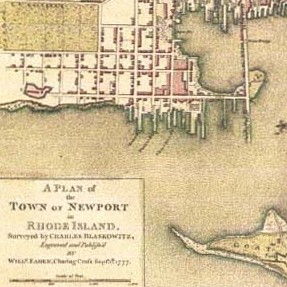
Goat Island and Easton's Point (1777 Newport map)

A year after arriving in Portsmouth there was discord among the leadership of the settlement, and several of the leaders decided to go elsewhere. Easton was one of nine men to sign an agreement on 28 April 1639 whereby a new plantation would be formed. The men and their families soon moved to the south end of Aquidneck Island, establishing the settlement of Newport, under the leadership of William Coddington, who had been the judge (governor) of Portsmouth up to this time. In November of the same year, Easton and John Clarke were appointed to inform Mr. Vane of the state of affairs on the island, and to look into obtaining a patent for the island from the king.

Winthrop wrote periodically about affairs in Rhode Island, seeming to always find justification for the removal of its leaders from the Massachusetts Bay Colony. In August 1641 he made some remarks directed largely at Easton's theology when he wrote, "Other troubles arose in the Island (Aquidneck) by reason of one Nicholas Easton, a tanner, a man very bold, though ignorant." He went on to discuss Easton's theological views in a disparaging way, and then concluded his paragraph, seeming to gloat over Rhode Island's difficulties with church governance by writing, "Then joined with Nicholas Easton, Mr. Coddington, Mr. Coggeshall and some others. But their minister, Mr. Clarke, and Mr. Lenthall and Mr. Harding, and some others dissented and publicly opposed, whereby it grew to such heat of contention, that it made a schism among them."

=== Colonial President ===
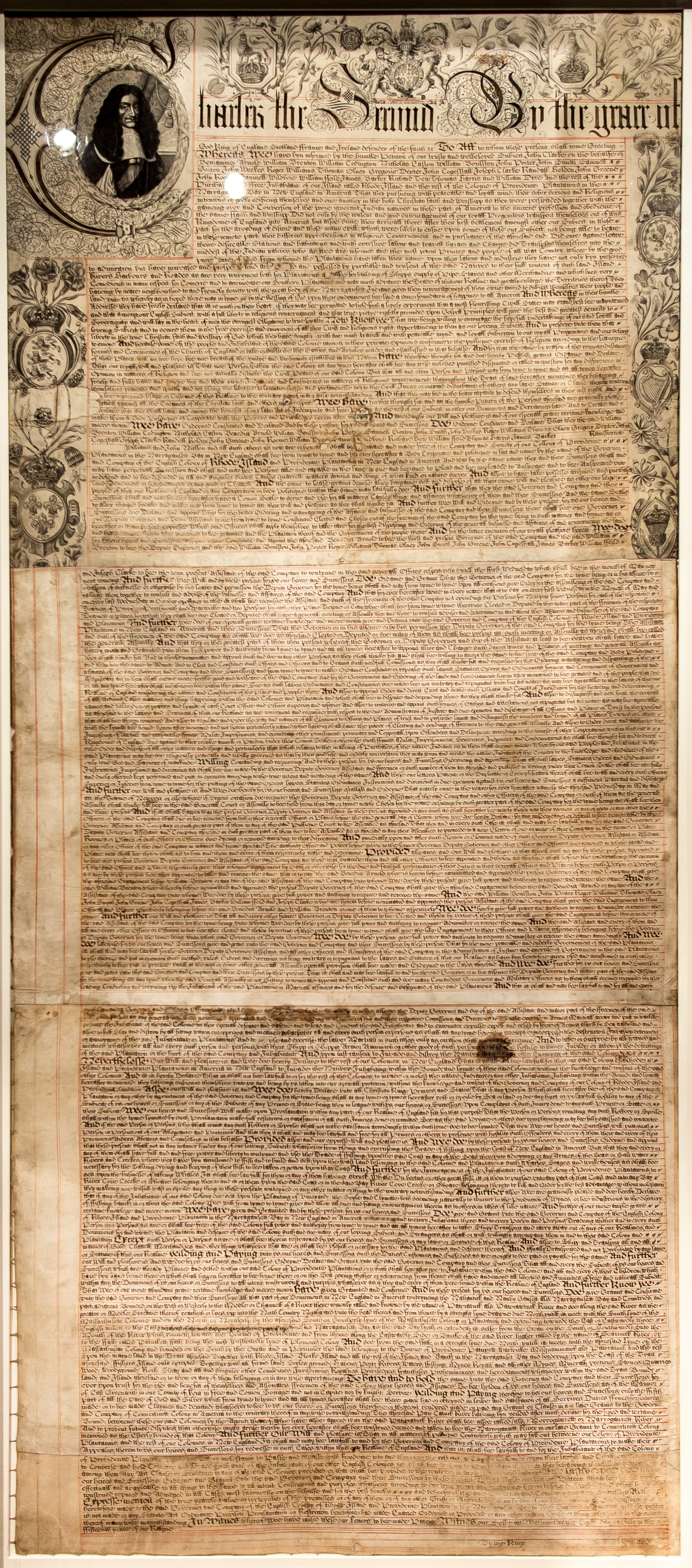
Easton was one of the prominent citizens named in Rhode Island's Royal Charter of 1663

Once settled in Newport, Easton became active in civil affairs. For several of the years from 1640 to 1644 he was the assistant to Governor Coddington, but served no public role in the late 1640s as the two settlements on Aquidneck (Newport and Portsmouth) merged into a common government with the two settlements on the west side of Narragansett Bay (Providence and Warwick). In May 1650 he was elected the President of the united colony of four towns, serving for a year, and then in 1654 he served for another year in the same role. During his first term, the legislative body became the General Assembly, with a fixed salary given to each member at two shillings and six pence per day. Also, military stores in the form of powder, lead and muskets were apportioned to each town, providing an estimate of each town's relative strength and population. Providence and Warwick each received one barrel of powder, Portsmouth received two, and Newport was given three barrels of powder, along with the other stores in roughly the same proportion.

A serious issue rising during Easton's first term as president concerned disputed titles to land at Pawtuxet (later Cranston, Rhode Island) and Warwick. The Pawtuxet settlers put themselves under the jurisdiction of the Massachusetts Bay Colony in 1642 because their leader, William Arnold, felt great contempt towards the settlements and leaders of both Providence and Warwick. When Providence assessed a tax of 12 pounds and 10 shillings on Pawtuxet, the latter refused to pay, and complained to Boston. Massachusetts then told Roger Williams that if the tax were collected, they would take action against the Rhode Island colony. Warwick, on the other hand, was claimed by the Plymouth Colony, then by the Massachusetts Bay Colony, and then by Plymouth again. Roger Williams was urged to go to England to intercede with the Royal Committee on Plantations. To make matters worse, Coddington was already in England, for reasons not known to the Rhode Island settlers, but he would eventually return to New England with a commission pulling Portsmouth and Newport out of the union with Providence and Warwick, creating a separate government for the two settlements on the island.

Another incident during Easton's first term further showed the weakness of the Rhode Island colony, and the hostility displayed towards it by its northern neighbor. When the Reverend John Clarke (pastor of the Baptist Church at Newport), Obadiah Holmes and John Crandall went to visit a sick church member in Lynn, Massachusetts, the three were arrested, tried, found guilty of being Anabaptists, and fined, and in default of payment to be "well whipped." Clarke's fine was paid by a friend, without his knowledge or consent, Crandall returned home on bail, but Holmes was whipped so cruelly that "for many days he could take no rest, except by supporting himself on his elbows and knees."

During the period from 1651 to 1654, Coddington, with his new commission from the Crown, became governor of the island towns of Newport and Portsmouth for two years, with John Sanford in charge during the third year. Meanwhile, the floundering settlements of Providence and Warwick had three different presidents during this period. Roger Williams had gone to England, and returned with the hope of reconciling the differences among the towns. He brought a letter from the former Massachusetts governor, Sir Harry Vane, always a staunch friend of the Rhode Island colonists, beseeching the people of the colony to reconcile their feuds. In the letter he wrote, "Are there no wise men among you? No public self-denying spirits...who can find some way of union before you become a prey to your enemies?" This was the backdrop for Easton's second term as president, which lasted the year from 1654 to 1655. The four towns of the Rhode Island Colony did reunite, so that in his second term, as in his first, Easton was at the helm of all four towns of the Rhode Island colony.

=== Colonial Governor ===
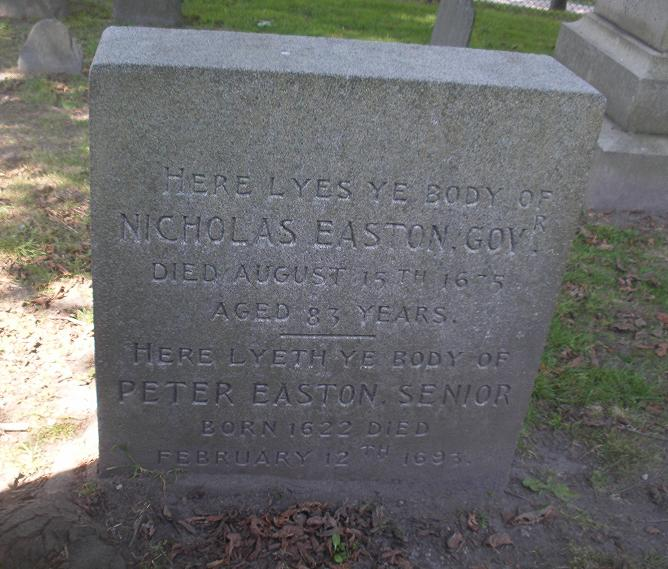
Grave marker for Nicholas Easton and his son Peter, Coddington Cemetery, Newport

Easton appeared on a list of Newport freemen in 1655, was a commissioner in 1660, and then for the last ten years of his life became seriously involved in the leadership of the colony beginning in 1665. Major changes had occurred since his presidency, such as the government of England changing from a Protectorate back to a Kingdom, with Oliver Cromwell dead and Charles II on the throne, and Harry Vane having been executed for treason. However, for the Rhode Island colony came a very positive development in the form of the Royal Charter of 1663, and Easton was one of several prominent citizens named in the document. In the wake of the disjointed government under the Patent of 1643, the new charter settled once and for all the conflicting claims of colonial existence and ownership. Easton served as Deputy in the General Assembly from Newport from 1665 to 1666, then became the Deputy Governor of the entire colony from 1666 to 1672. In May 1672 William Brenton was elected Governor of the colony, but refused to serve, at which time Easton was elected and served for two terms until 1674 when he was succeeded by William Coddington. He died in August 1675 at the age of 81 years, and was buried in the Coddington Cemetery, sometimes called the Friends' Burial Ground, in Newport next to his second wife, Christian.

== Family and legacy ==
The mother of all Easton's children was his first wife, Mary Kent, the daughter of Thomas Kent and Ellen Pile who were married at Over Wallop, Hampshire on 26 June 1585. Thomas Kent, who was the son of Richard Kent, died in 1605, after which Mary's mother Ellen married Peter Osgood. Easton had two sons who reached adulthood, both of whom came with him to New England. The older son, Peter, named for his mother's stepfather, married Ann, the daughter of President John Coggeshall. He was active in colonial affairs as sergeant, commissioner, assistant, treasurer and Attorney General. Peter's daughter, Mary, married Weston Clarke, a son of President Jeremy Clarke, and his daughter Waite married John Carr, the son of Governor Caleb Carr. Easton's other son, John was involved in colonial politics virtually his entire adult life, and served as governor himself for five terms between 1690 and 1695. Easton's widow, Ann, later married Henry Bull, who served as governor of the colony for two short periods during the 1690s. Easton's Point in Newport is named for Nicholas Easton, as is Easton's Beach, which was described by historian Thomas W. Bicknell as "a permanent monument in the honor of this earnest, faithful, honored founder of Rhode Island..."

== See also ==
- John Easton for ancestry chart
- List of colonial governors of Rhode Island
- List of lieutenant governors of Rhode Island
- List of early settlers of Rhode Island
- Colony of Rhode Island and Providence Plantations
