= Jeremy Clarke (governor) =

English colonist in North America (1605–1652)

Jeremiah Clarke
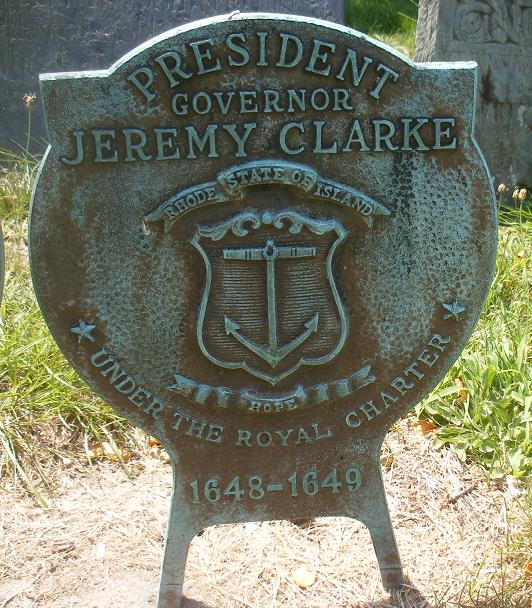
- Jeremy Clarke grave medallion

2nd President of the Colony of Rhode Island and Providence Plantations
- In office 1648–1649
- Preceded by: John Coggeshall
- Succeeded by: John Smith

Personal details
- Born: baptized 1 December 1605 East Farleigh, Kent, England
- Died: January 1652 Newport, Colony of Rhode Island and Providence Plantations
- Resting place: Clifton Burying Ground, Newport
- Spouse: Frances (Latham) Dungan
- Children: Walter, Mary, Jeremiah, Latham, Weston, James, Sarah
- Occupation: Constable, captain, treasurer, assistant, president

Jeremiah Clarke (also known as Jeremy Clarke) (1605–1652) was an early settler in the English Colony of Rhode Island and Providence Plantations. Born into a prominent family in England, he was a merchant who came to came to the New England with his wife, Frances Latham, and four stepchildren, settling first at Portsmouth in 1638, but the following year joining William Coddington and others in establishing the town of Newport. Here he held a variety of civic positions until 1648 when Coddington's election as President of the colony was disputed, and Clarke was chosen to serve in that office instead. He was the father of Walter Clarke, another governor of the colony, and also had family connections with several other future governors of the colony.

== Immigration to New England ==
Coat of Arms of Jeremy Clarke

Born in central Kent in southeastern England, Jeremy Clarke was the son of William Clarke and Mary Weston. His maternal grandfather was Sir Jerome Weston, Baron of the Exchequer, and his uncle was Richard Weston, 1st Earl of Portland, Lord High Treasurer of England. Clarke was a merchant in London before sailing to New England. While in England he married Frances (Latham) Dungan, the widow of William Dungan, and the daughter of Lewis Latham, and she and her four Dungan children accompanied Clarke to the American colonies. They first settled on Aquidneck Island (later Rhode Island), and Clarke was listed as an inhabitant there in 1638. In April 1639, while living in Portsmouth he was one of nine men who signed a compact, agreeing to establish a government just prior to settling in Newport. In Newport he held a variety of positions from 1639 to 1649, including treasurer, constable, and assistant. In March 1640 he had 116 acres of land laid out for him in Newport, and the same year he was one of three appointed to lay out remaining lands in Newport. In 1642 he was chosen lieutenant of the military in Newport and in 1644 he became captain.

== Colonial Presidency ==
In 1648 Clarke was Newport's assistant to the governor, but became President Regent, or acting governor, of the entire colony (four towns) when accusations were made against William Coddington, who had been elected to that position that May. Coddington did not particularly care for the patent that Roger Williams had obtained from the crown in 1644; he much preferred autonomy for the two Rhode Island towns of Portsmouth and Newport, or even their union with the Massachusetts Bay Colony. Also, Coddington was a Royalist, supporting the King, Charles I, while most of the Rhode Island settlers supported the Puritan Party in England. For these, and probably other reasons not made clear in the court records of the day, Coddington was suspended from the office of President to which he had been elected, and Jeremy Clarke became the governor in his place.

One of the most important events of Clarke's administration was the granting of a charter to the town of Providence on 14 March 1649. Though first settled in 1636, this was the first recognition of organized government in what was called Providence Plantations in the Narragansett Bay in New England. This charter of civil incorporation gave the free inhabitants of the town full power and authority to govern and rule themselves.

Civil records do not show Clarke serving in any official capacity beyond his presidency. While the Society of Friends (Quakers) had not become established until after his death, his son Walter became a Quaker, and the Friends' records indicate that Jeremy Clarke was buried "by the street by the waterside in Newport" in the "11th month, 1651," which is January 1652 in the current calendar. While the location of his burial is no longer known, he has a governor's grave medallion next to the marker for his son Walter Clarke in the Clifton Burying Ground in Newport, where a number of prominent Quakers are buried. His widow later married William Vaughan, dying early in September 1677 "in the 67th year of her age. She is buried in the Common Burying Ground in Newport, with the inscription on her marker reading, "Here lyeth ye body of Mrs. Frances Vaughan, Alius Clarke, ye mother of ye only children of Capt'n Jeremiah Clarke."

== Family ==
Clarke and his wife Frances had seven children together, the oldest of whom was Walter Clarke, a future colonial governor of Rhode Island. Their oldest daughter, Mary, married John Cranston, another future governor of the colony, and their son Weston married Mary Easton who was a granddaughter of two other governors, John Coggeshall and Nicholas Easton. Their youngest child, Sarah, married the future colonial governor Caleb Carr as her second husband.

== See also ==
- List of colonial governors of Rhode Island
- List of early settlers of Rhode Island
- Colony of Rhode Island and Providence Plantations
