= John Coggeshall =

British statesman (1599–1647)

John Coggeshall Sr.
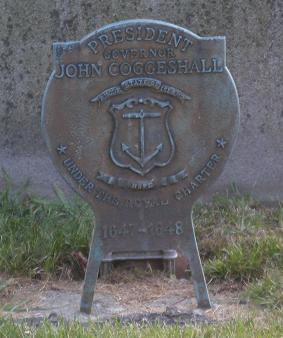
- John Coggeshall grave medallion

1st President of the Colony of Rhode Island and Providence Plantations
- In office 1647–1647
- Preceded by: Position created
- Succeeded by: Jeremy Clarke

Personal details
- Born: 2 December 1599 Halstead, Essex, England
- Died: 27 November 1647 (aged 47) Newport, Rhode Island
- Resting place: Coggeshall Cemetery, Newport, Rhode Island
- Children: John, Anne, Mary, James, Joshua, Hananiel, Wait, Bedaiah
- Occupation: Merchant, selectman, deputy, corporal, moderator, president

John Coggeshall Sr. (2 December 1599 – 27 November 1647) was a British colonial statesman who was one of the founders of the Colony of Rhode Island and Providence Plantations and the first President of all four towns in the Colony. He was a successful silk merchant in Essex, England, but he emigrated to the Massachusetts Bay Colony in 1632 and quickly assumed a number of roles in the colonial government. In the mid-1630s, he became a supporter of dissident minister John Wheelwright and of Anne Hutchinson. Hutchinson was tried as a heretic in 1637, and Coggeshall was one of three deputies who voted for her acquittal. She was banished from the colony in 1638, and the three deputies who voted for her acquittal were also compelled to leave. Before leaving Boston, Coggeshall and many other Hutchinson supporters signed the Portsmouth Compact in March 1638 agreeing to form a government based on the individual consent of the inhabitants. They then established the settlement of Portsmouth on Aquidneck Island (called Rhode Island at the time), one of the four towns comprising the Colony of Rhode Island and Providence Plantations.

Coggeshall was very active in civil affairs, but a rift in the leadership of the colony caused him and several other leaders to leave in 1639, moving to the south end of the island and establishing the town of Newport. The towns of Portsmouth and Newport reunited in 1640 under the leadership of William Coddington, and Coggeshall was his assistant until 1647 when the two towns on Rhode Island united to form a common government with the towns of Providence and Warwick, and Coggeshall was elected President of the entire Colony of Rhode Island and Providence Plantations. His tenure was very short due to his death later the same year, but during his administration many laws were established which became the basis for the colony and the future State of Rhode Island.

== England and Massachusetts ==
John Coggeshall was the son of John and Ann (Butter) Coggeshall. He was born and raised in northeastern Essex, England, and baptised at Halstead. After his marriage, he lived four miles (six km) away in Castle Hedingham where several of his children were baptised, and where he was a merchant prior to his emigration. In 1632, Coggeshall and his family joined the mass migration of English Puritans to New England, sailing on the Lyon, the same ship that carried Roger Williams the year before. The Coggeshalls first settled at Roxbury where they were admitted to the Roxbury Church the year of their arrival, and where John Eliot became the pastor. In 1634, Coggeshall moved with his family to Boston where he and his wife were admitted to the church on 20 August, and where they became the nextdoor neighbors of William and Anne Hutchinson.

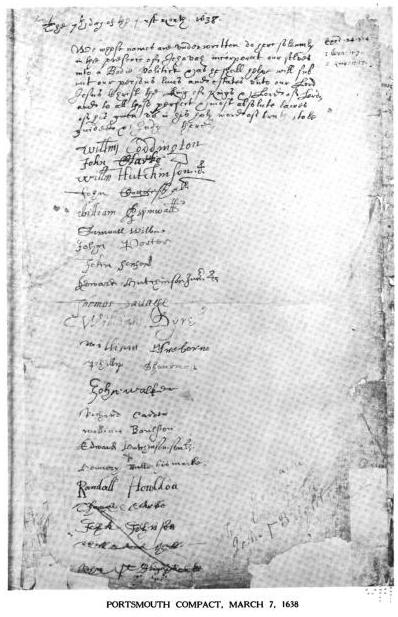
Portsmouth Compact with Coggeshall's signature fourth on the list

Coggeshall was a mercer in the silk trade, and he held many offices in the Massachusetts Bay Colony. He was a deputy to the General Court for Boston from 1634 to 1637 and a Boston selectman during the same period. In 1634, he was also on a committee to survey Mount Wollaston, and also on a committee to oversee ammunition.

Sometime after moving to Boston, Coggeshall became an enthusiastic supporter of Anne Hutchinson, who was at the centre of the growing Antinomian Controversy. Also supporting her initially were the Reverend John Cotton and many of the Boston church members. Even the colony's Governor Henry Vane was a strong admirer, but he was voted out of office and John Winthrop became the governor. At that point, strong measures were taken to "stamp out heresy and drive out the heretics," in the words of one modern historian. Anne Hutchinson was tried, convicted, and banished from the colony because of her religious opinions, her prophecies of God's wrath and destruction upon the colony, and her influence in fanning the flames of controversy within the community. At her civil trial, Coggeshall spoke out in her defense and was one of only three deputies to vote for her acquittal, the other two being William Aspinwall and William Coddington. Coggeshall also supported dissident minister Reverend John Wheelwright, whose wife was the sister of Anne Hutchinson's husband. Shortly after Hutchinson's banishment, Coggeshall was expelled from the General Court and was also directed to leave Massachusetts in March 1638.

Many of Hutchinson's supporters were ordered out of the Massachusetts colony, but a group of them (including Coggeshall) signed what is called the Portsmouth Compact before leaving Boston, thus establishing a non-sectarian civil government with a Christian focus, upon the universal consent of the inhabitants. The group initially planned to settle in New Netherland, but they were persuaded by Roger Williams to purchase some land from the Indians on Narragansett Bay. They moved to the northeast end of Rhode Island and established the settlement of Pocasset, changing the name to Portsmouth in 1639. William Coddington was elected the first judge (governor) of the settlement. In May 1638, Coggeshall was on a committee to lay out land there, and he was granted six acres at the same time. The following year, a disagreement prompted Coddington and a few other leaders, including Coggeshall, to leave Portsmouth and begin a new settlement called Newport at the south end of the island. Governor Winthrop described the 1639 disagreement in Portsmouth in his journal: "the people grew very tumultuous and put out Mr. Coddington and the other three magistrates." Coggeshall was one of the three referred to by Winthrop.

== Rhode Island ==
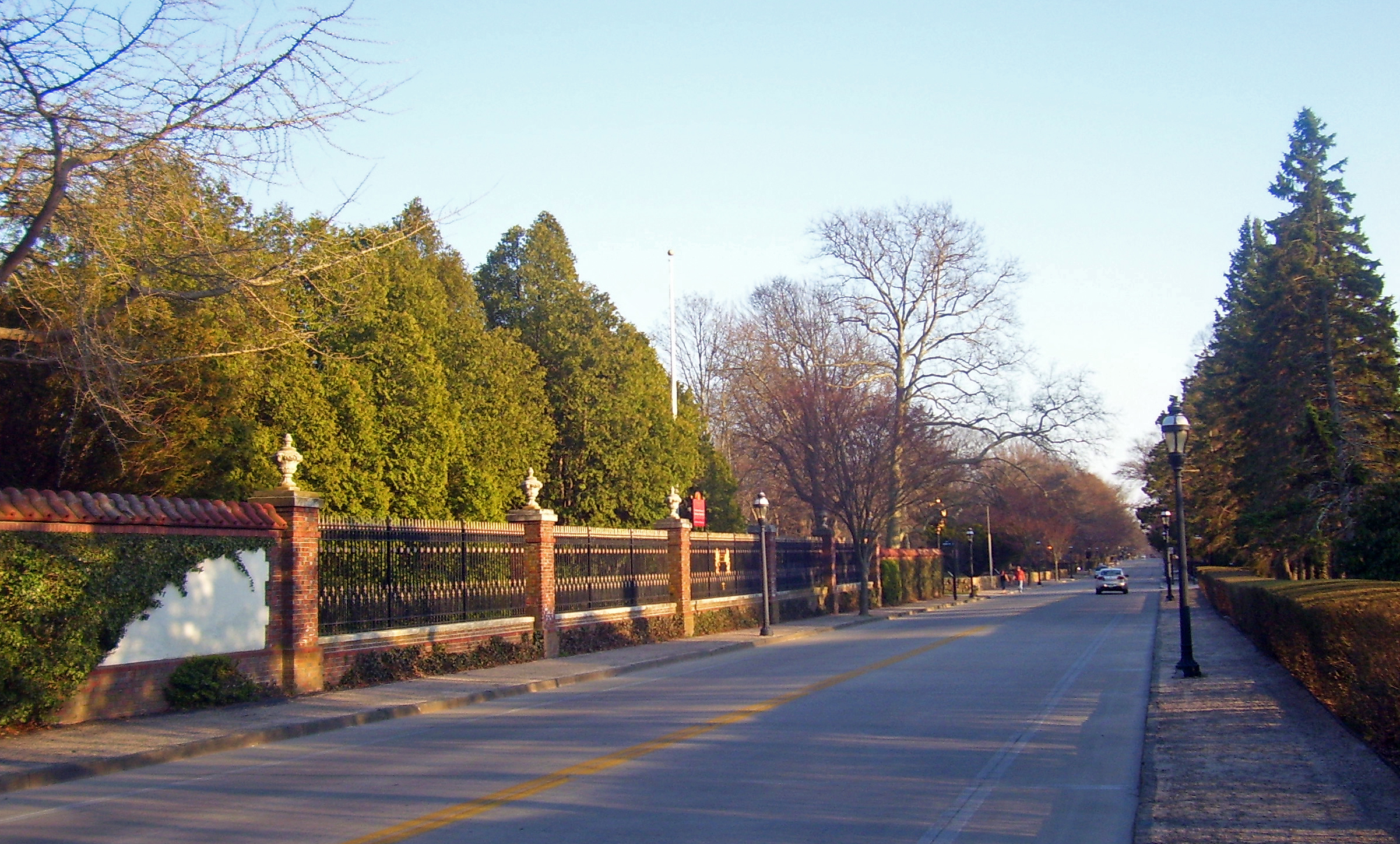
Coggeshall's land was located near present-day Bellevue Avenue in Newport

Coggeshall was soon a leader in Newport and was granted 400 acres (1.6 km^{2}) of land on the south side of the town, along Bellevue Avenue. In the first election in 1638, he was elected as treasurer, and he became an assistant to the governor in 1640, which position he held continuously until 1647. He had a good working relationship with Roger Williams which helped the towns of Portsmouth, Newport, Providence, and Warwick to unite and form the Colony of Rhode Island and Providence Plantations in the Spring of 1647, under the patent that Williams had obtained from the crown in 1644. In May 1647, Coggeshall was elected the chief magistrate of the four-town colony with the title of President. He had an assistant from each town, a general recorder, and a treasurer. Under his administration, the courts of justice were established and the first complete code of laws was written. Rhode Island historian and Lieutenant Governor Samuel G. Arnold made this tribute to the digest of statutes enacted under Coggeshall in 1647:

For simplicity of diction, unencumbered as it is by the superfluous verbiage that clothes our modern statutes in learned obscurity; for breadth of comprehension, embracing as it does the foundation of the whole body of law, on every subject, which has since been adopted; and for vigor and originality of thought and boldness of expression, as well as for the vast significance and the brilliant triumph of the principles it embodies, the Digest of 1647 presents a model of legislation which has never been surpassed.

— Samuel G. Arnold, writing of the laws established during Coggeshall's administration

Coggeshall was in office only briefly, dying of an illness in Newport on 27 November 1647 and being buried on his own property there. He is noted for being the first president of the united Colony of Rhode Island and Providence Plantations. He is also noted for helping to establish the three towns of Boston, Portsmouth, and Newport, and the two colonies of Massachusetts Bay and Rhode Island.

== Family and legacy ==
Coat of Arms of John Coggeshall

Coggeshall's wife was named Mary, but her maiden name remains uncertain. Some sources claim that her maiden name was Gould, another says that it was Surgis, but these are undocumented. Coggeshall and his wife had eight children, five of whom were born in England and the others in Boston, but only half of whom are known to have survived to maturity. Their oldest child John was very active in colonial affairs over a period of three decades, serving as treasurer, commissioner, assistant, and deputy governor. Their son Joshua also served in public office as deputy to the General Court of Rhode Island for all but two years between 1664 and 1672, and as assistant (magistrate) for all but one year from 1669 to 1676. Their oldest daughter Ann married Peter Easton, a son of Nicholas Easton who served many terms as either president or governor of the Rhode Island colony. Their daughter Wayte married Daniel Gould; descendant Elizabeth Buffum Chace was an abolitionist with the Underground Railroad.

Places named for President Coggeshall include John Coggeshall Elementary School in Portsmouth, Rhode Island; Coggeshall Way and Coggeshall Circle in rural Middletown; and Coggeshall Avenue in Newport, which goes through the original Coggeshall property.

== See also ==
- List of colonial governors of Rhode Island
- List of early settlers of Rhode Island
- Colony of Rhode Island and Providence Plantations
- Antinomian Controversy
