= Caleb Carr (governor) =

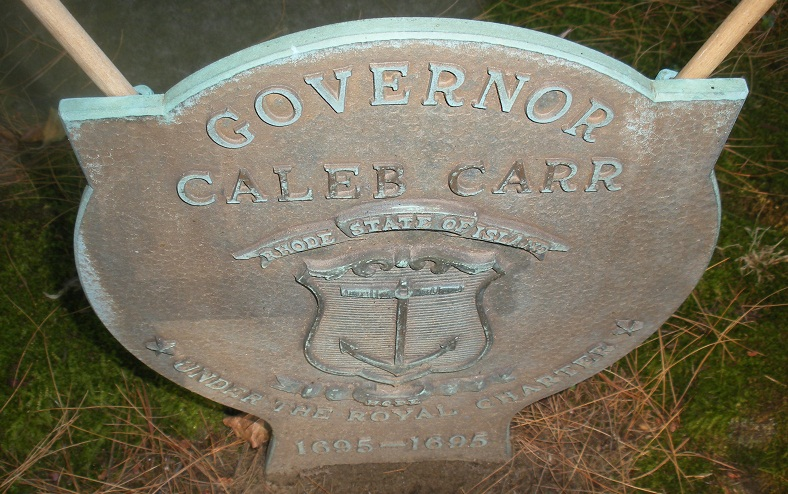
- Governor Caleb Carr grave medallion

16th Governor of the Colony of Rhode Island and Providence Plantations
- In office 1695–1695
- Preceded by: John Easton
- Succeeded by: Walter Clarke

Personal details
- Born: 9 December 1616; London, England
- Died: 17 December 1695; Newport, Rhode Island
- Resting place: Carr Family Burying Ground, Newport (cemetery later moved to Jamestown)
- Spouse(s): Mercy Vaughn; Sarah (Clarke) Pinner
- Occupation: Commissioner, Assistant, Deputy, Governor

Caleb Carr (1616 – 17 December 1695) was a governor of the Colony of Rhode Island and Providence Plantations, serving a very short term prior to his death. In 1635, at the age of 19, he sailed from England on the ship Elizabeth and Ann with his older brother Robert. Carr's name appears on a list of Newport freemen in 1655, and he began serving in a civil capacity the year prior when he became a commissioner. He served in this capacity for a total of six years between 1654 and 1662, and then served as deputy for 12 years from 1664 to 1690. During the years when he wasn't serving as deputy, he was an assistant, serving in this role for a total of ten years. From 1677 to 1678 he was the justice of the General Quarter Session and Inferior Court of Common Pleas.

Between 1658 and 1663 Carr purchased several large tracts of land on Conanicut Island (later becoming Jamestown), and following his death he willed this property to his sons. He owned a boat, and in 1671 he was paid four pounds for services rendered with the craft. In 1676 he bought the services of an Indian captive, for which he paid 12 bushels of Indian corn. Carr was an enslaver, bequeathing at least two enslaved persons in his will.

Carr became governor of the colony in 1695, and in this capacity he wrote to Governor Fletcher of New York in answer to a request for 48 men from Rhode Island to assist in the defense of New York. He agreed to either send the men, or some comparable assistance. Carr died late in 1695 and was buried in a family cemetery in Newport. He was succeeded as governor by Walter Clarke.

Carr had 13 children, nine with his first wife, Mercy (three died young), and four with his second wife, Sarah Clarke. His second wife was the widow of John Pinner and a daughter of Frances Latham and former colonial President Jeremy Clarke.

== See also ==
- List of colonial governors of Rhode Island
- Colony of Rhode Island and Providence Plantations
