= Aquidneck Island =

Island in Rhode Island, United States

Aquidneck Island Rhode Island
- Aquidneck Island highlighted in the state of Rhode Island
- Interactive map of Aquidneck Island; Rhode Island

Geography
- Location: Narragansett Bay
- Coordinates: 41°33′20″N 71°15′53″W
- Area: 37.8 sq mi (98 km^{2})
- Length: 15 mi (24 km)
- Width: 5 mi (8 km)
- Highest elevation: 286 ft (87.2 m)
- Highest point: Quaker Hill

Administration
- United States
- State: Rhode Island
- County: Newport County
- Largest settlement: Newport (pop. 25,163)

Demographics
- Population: 60,109 (2020)
- Pop. density: 613/km^{2} (1588/sq mi)

Aquidneck Island (/əˈkwɪdnɛk/ ə-KWID-nek), officially known as Rhode Island, is an island in Narragansett Bay in the state of Rhode Island. The total land area is 37.8 sq mi (98 km^{2}), which makes it the largest island in the bay. The 2020 United States Census reported its population as 60,109. The state of Rhode Island is named after the island; the United States Board on Geographic Names recognizes Rhode Island as the name for the island, although it is widely referred to as Aquidneck Island in the state and by the island's residents, mostly to avoid confusing this island with the state as a whole.

Aquidneck Island is home to three towns: from north to south, Portsmouth, Middletown, and Newport.

== Etymology ==
"Aquidneck" is derived from the Narragansett name for the island aquidnet. Roger Williams was an authority on the Narragansett language, but he stated that he never learned the word's meaning.

== Island names over time ==
It is unclear how Aquidneck came to be known as Rhode Island, but the earliest known use of the name was in 1637 by Roger Williams, and it was officially applied to the island in 1644: "Aquethneck shall be henceforth called the Ile of Rods or Rhod-Island." The name "Isle of Rodes" is used in a legal document as late as 1646.

One theory states that Adriaen Block passed by Aquidneck Island during his 1614 expedition, describing it in a 1625 account of his travels as "an island of reddish appearance" (in 17th century Dutch een rodlich Eylande). Dutch maps from as early as 1659 call it "Roode Eylant" or Red Island. Historians have theorized that it was named by the Dutch (possibly by Adriaen Block himself) for either the red autumn foliage or red clay on portions of the shore.

In 1644, the settlements on Rhode Island (Portsmouth and Newport) united with Providence Plantations and Warwick to form the Colony of Rhode Island and Providence Plantations and, eventually, the State of Rhode Island (formerly State of Rhode Island and Providence Plantations). The entire state is now commonly referred to as Rhode Island, and the official name of Aquidneck Island is still "Rhode Island". The United States Board on Geographic Names addressed the issue in 1930 by using both names of the island on its maps. By 1964, the board decided that having two names was confusing, and "Rhode Island" was used exclusively as the official name. Attempts have been made, as recently as 2004, to change the official name to "Aquidneck Island", but all of these have failed. The name Aquidneck Island is widely used in Rhode Island to refer to the island, including by publications such as The Newport Daily News.

== History ==
Colonists settled on Aquidneck Island in 1638 in the region that the Narragansetts called "Pocasset" (meaning "where the stream widens"), the northern part of Portsmouth. They engaged Roger Williams to negotiate the terms of their settlement of the island from the Narragansett sachems Canonicus and Miantonomi. These settlers included William Coddington, Anne and William Hutchinson, Philip Sherman, William Dyer, John Coggeshall, Nicholas Easton, William Brenton, John Clarke, and Richard Maxson (Maggsen). In thanks for being allowed to settle Aquidneck Island, the settlers gave the Narragansetts 40 fathoms of white wampum, 20 hoes, 10 coats, and 5 more fathoms of wampum for the sachems. Canonicus and his nephew Miantonomi signed a deed for it. However, as Roger Williams made clear in a June 1638 letter to Puritan lawyer John Winthrop, one of the leading figures in founding the Massachusetts Bay Colony: "Sir, concerning the islands Prudence and...Aquedenick ...neither of them were sold properly, for a thousand fathom would not have bought either, by strangers. The truth is, not a penny was demanded for either, and what was paid was only gratuity, though I chose, for better assurance and form, to call it sale." These first settlers founded Pocasset, but William Coddington chose Newport for a settlement the following spring (1639) because of its excellent harbor, and some of the settlers followed him there.

The British army occupied Aquidneck Island during the American Revolution from 1776 to 1779. The Continental Army under command of Major General John Sullivan attempted to drive them out in the Battle of Rhode Island on August 29, 1778, but without success.

== Schools ==
The island is home to Salve Regina University, the Newport campus of the Community College of Rhode Island, and International Yacht Restoration School. Naval Station Newport is located on Aquidneck Island and the adjacent Coasters Harbor Island.

It is also home to two well known private boarding schools: St. George's School in Middletown and Portsmouth Abbey School in Portsmouth. The island also contains numerous public and private primary and secondary schools as a part of the school systems of Newport, Middletown and Portsmouth.

== Bridges ==
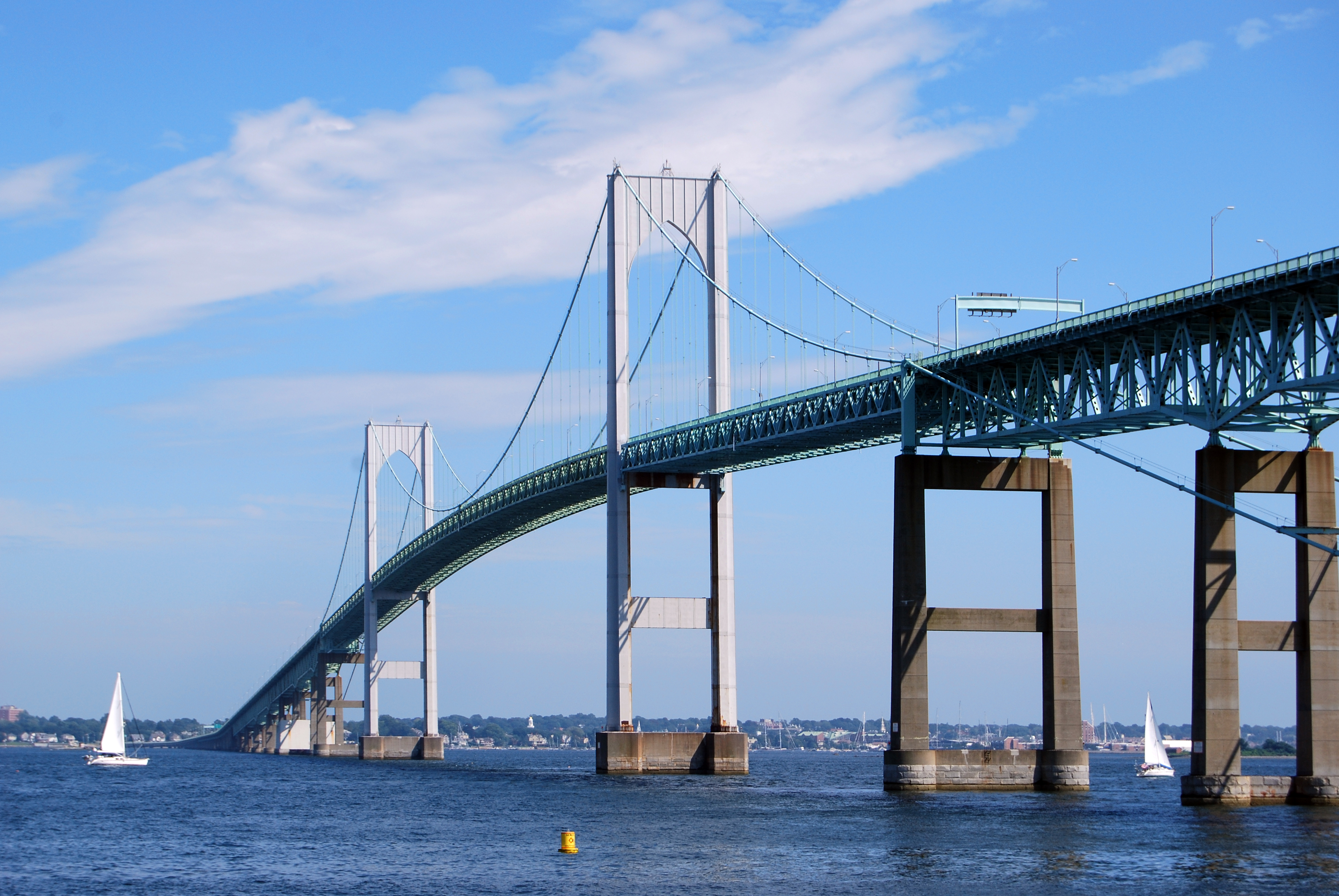
The Claiborne Pell Newport Bridge

Aquidneck Island is served by three bridges: The Claiborne Pell Newport Bridge (1969) connects it to Jamestown on nearby Conanicut Island in Narragansett Bay, and subsequently to the mainland on the western side of the bay. The Mount Hope Bridge (1929) is adjacent to Bristol Ferry and Common Fence Point and connects the northern side of Aquidneck Island in Portsmouth to the mainland at Bristol. The Sakonnet River Bridge (2012) in Portsmouth connects the northeastern side of the island to the mainland at Tiverton over the Sakonnet River, a narrow saltwater strait. It is a replacement for a bridge of the same name built in 1956.

== Environmental contamination ==
The west coast of Aquidneck Island is part of Naval Station Newport, a superfund site since 1989. Almost the entire area from its fuel tank farms drains into ditches and into Narragansett Bay. The Navy has been rehabilitating the property following contamination from petroleum, heavy metals, including lead and arsenic, and polychlorinated biphenyls (PCBs) where there were electrical transformers. In addition there is PFAS contamination of groundwater and in surface runoff water. The groundwater is used for irrigation on crops and lawn sprinkler systems.
