= Rhode Island Royal Charter =

1663 royal recognition charter

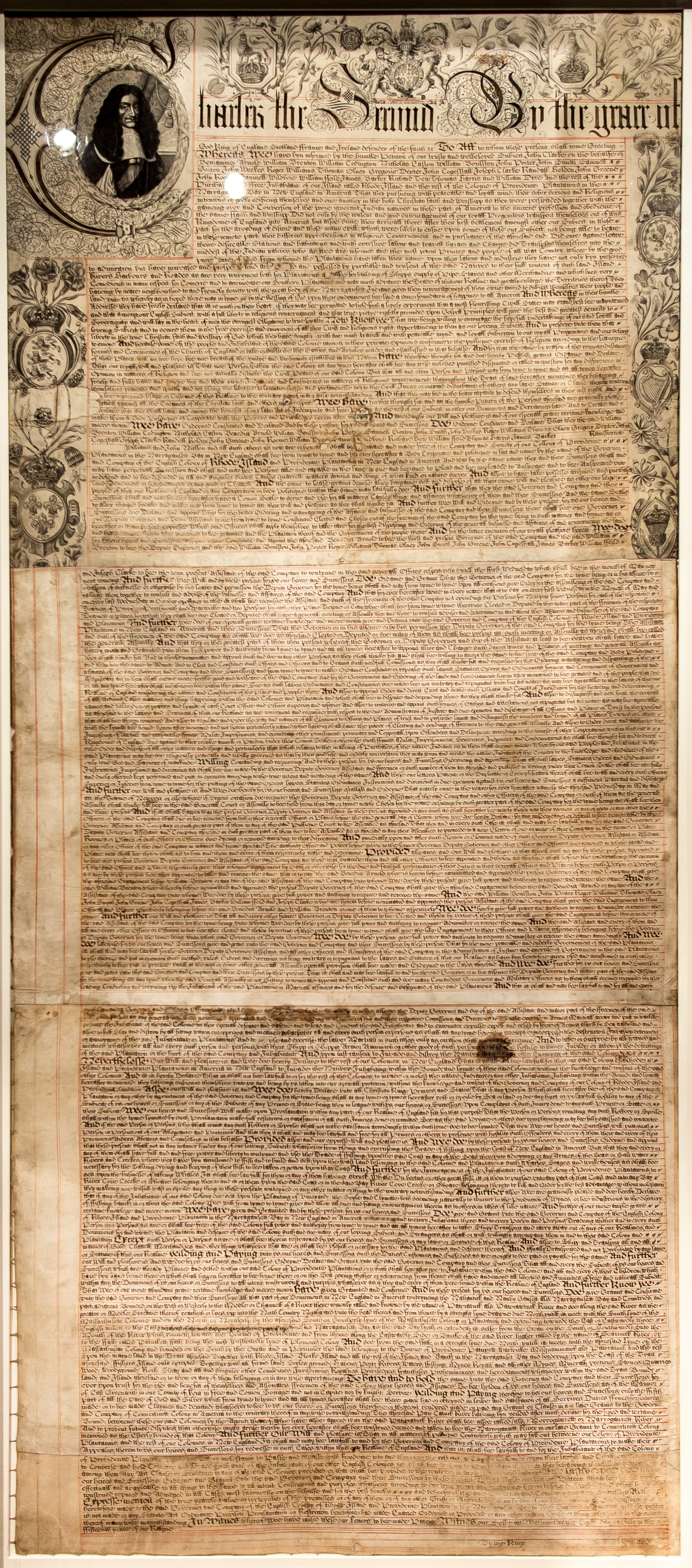
- Created: 8 July 1663
- Location: Rhode Island State House, Providence
- Author: John Clarke
- Signatories: King Charles II of England
- Purpose: Establish the government of the Colony of Rhode Island and Providence Plantations

The Rhode Island Royal Charter provided royal recognition to the Colony of Rhode Island and Providence Plantations, approved by England's King Charles II in July 1663. It superseded the 1643 Patent for Settlement and outlined many freedoms for the inhabitants of Rhode Island. It was the guiding document of the colony's government (and that of the state later) over a period of 180 years.

The charter contains unique provisions which make it significantly different from the charters granted to the other colonies. It gave the colonists freedom to elect their own governor and write their own laws, within very broad guidelines, and also stipulated that no person residing in Rhode Island could be "molested, punished, disquieted, or called in question for any differences in opinion in matters of religion".

The charter was not replaced until 1843, after serving for nearly two centuries as the guiding force of the colony and then the State of Rhode Island and Providence Plantations. Historian Thomas Bicknell described it as "the grandest instrument of human liberty ever constructed".

== Background ==
The Colony of Rhode Island and Providence Plantations began as settlements in Providence, Newport, Portsmouth, and Warwick. The settlements banded together under the Patent of 1643–1644, recognizing their corporate existence and compelling recognition from their neighbors as well. The patent produced a confederacy of the four settlements, not a united single colony. John Clarke went to England, then ruled by Oliver Cromwell, to have the instrument revoked in 1653, then remained in England for the next decade and became the agent to represent the interests of the fledgling Rhode Island colony. Commissioners of the four settlements forwarded ideas to Clarke concerning a possible union of the settlements into a single colony. The overthrow of Cromwell's Commonwealth and the Stuart Restoration necessitated getting a charter from the new King.

== Provisions ==
The Royal Charter of 1663 confirmed everything that the Patent of 1643–1644 had given, and it granted power to the colony to make its own laws, guaranteed religious freedom, and did not require oaths of allegiance. Three points in the charter distinguish it from any other royal patent that had ever been granted. It acknowledges Indian rights to the soil, which was far different than the European doctrine of "possession by right of discovery" which was part of the "royal prerogative". Historian Samuel G. Arnold writes that "Rhode Island was the first solemn protest" against taking land from the Indians without payment. Roger Williams established this policy when he settled the colony by paying the Narragansetts for the land, and his views were maintained by those who followed him there. These views were set forth by Clarke in his address to the King, and thus became incorporated within the royal charter. The points regarding Native Americans in the royal charter extended to other English colonies as well, declaring it illegal for both Rhode Island and neighboring colonies to “[...] invade the natives inhabiting within the bounds and limits of their said Colonies, without the knowledge and consent of the said other Colonies”.

A second remarkable point in the charter is the right of conscience that it extended to the Rhode Island colonists, which became the "sole distinguishing feature of Rhode Island's history". The charter notably uses gender-neutral language in its affirmation of freedom of conscience. This may have been influenced by a major controversy in early Providence regarding a woman named Jane Verin who claimed the right of conscience in walking away from her husband's severe domestic abuse. Roger Williams had found in favor of Jane and deprived her husband of suffrage, but William Arnold and William Harris, who believed that Jane's husband had the right to discipline her, left Providence and founded Cranston, Rhode Island in 1642.

A third distinguishing point is its "democratic liberalism" which allowed the Rhode Island colonists to elect their own officers and make their own laws, so long as they were not contrary to the laws of England. The provisions were very flexible, allowing the laws to consider "the nature and constitution of the place and people there".

The government was to consist of a governor, a deputy governor, ten assistants, and a house of deputies: six from Newport, four each from Providence, Warwick, and Portsmouth, and two from every other town. The governor, deputy governor, and assistants were to be chosen annually by election at Newport on the first Wednesday of May, and the deputies were to be chosen by their representative towns. The entire legislative body would be called the General Assembly and would meet in May and October, though the places and times of meeting could be altered. Benedict Arnold was named in the charter as governor and William Brenton named as deputy governor until the first election. The charter named William Boulston, John Porter, Roger Williams, Thomas Olney, John Smith, John Greene, Jr., John Coggeshall, Jr., James Barker, William Field, and Joseph Clarke as deputies. It also lists primary purchasers and free inhabitants of the colony William Coddington, Nicholas Easton, Samuel Gorton, John Weekes, Gregory Dexter, Randall Holden, John Roome, Samuel Wilbur, Jr., Richard Tew, Thomas Harris, and William Dyre.

The charter specifically required that the adjacent colonies permit the people of Rhode Island to pass unmolested, due to various acts committed in the past by other colonies. It also minutely defined the boundary lines for Rhode Island Colony, though it was nearly a century before Massachusetts and Connecticut stopped disputing them.

== Implementation ==
Rhode Island's General Court of Commissioners convened at Newport on 24 November 1663 for the last time under the parliamentary patent of 1643–1644. The inhabitants and legislators gathered to learn the result of John Clarke's decade-long efforts, described in the colonial records:

At a very great meeting and assembly of the freemen of the colony of Providence Plantation, at Newport, in Rhode Island, in New England, November the 24th, 1663. The abovesayed Assembly being legally called and orderly mett for the sollome reception of his Majestyes gratious letter pattent unto them sent, and having in order thereto chosen the President, Benedict Arnold, Moderator of the Assembly, it was Voted: That the box in which the King's gratious letters were enclosed be opened, and the letters with the broad seale thereto affixed be taken forth and read by Captayne George Baxter in the audience and view of all the people; which was accordingly done, and the sayd letters with his Majesty's Royall Stampe, and the broad seal, with much becoming gravity held up on hygh, and presented to the perfect view of the people, and then returned into the box and locked up by the Governor, in order to the safe keeping of it.

The legislature voted the following day that words of humble thanks should be delivered to the King and also to the Earl of Clarendon. They voted to give a £100 gratuity to Clarke and £25 to Baxter.

The Charter was not replaced until 1843, 180 years later, in order to extend the rights to all native adult males, including blacks. It was the oldest constitutional charter in the world when it was retired.

== Legacy ==
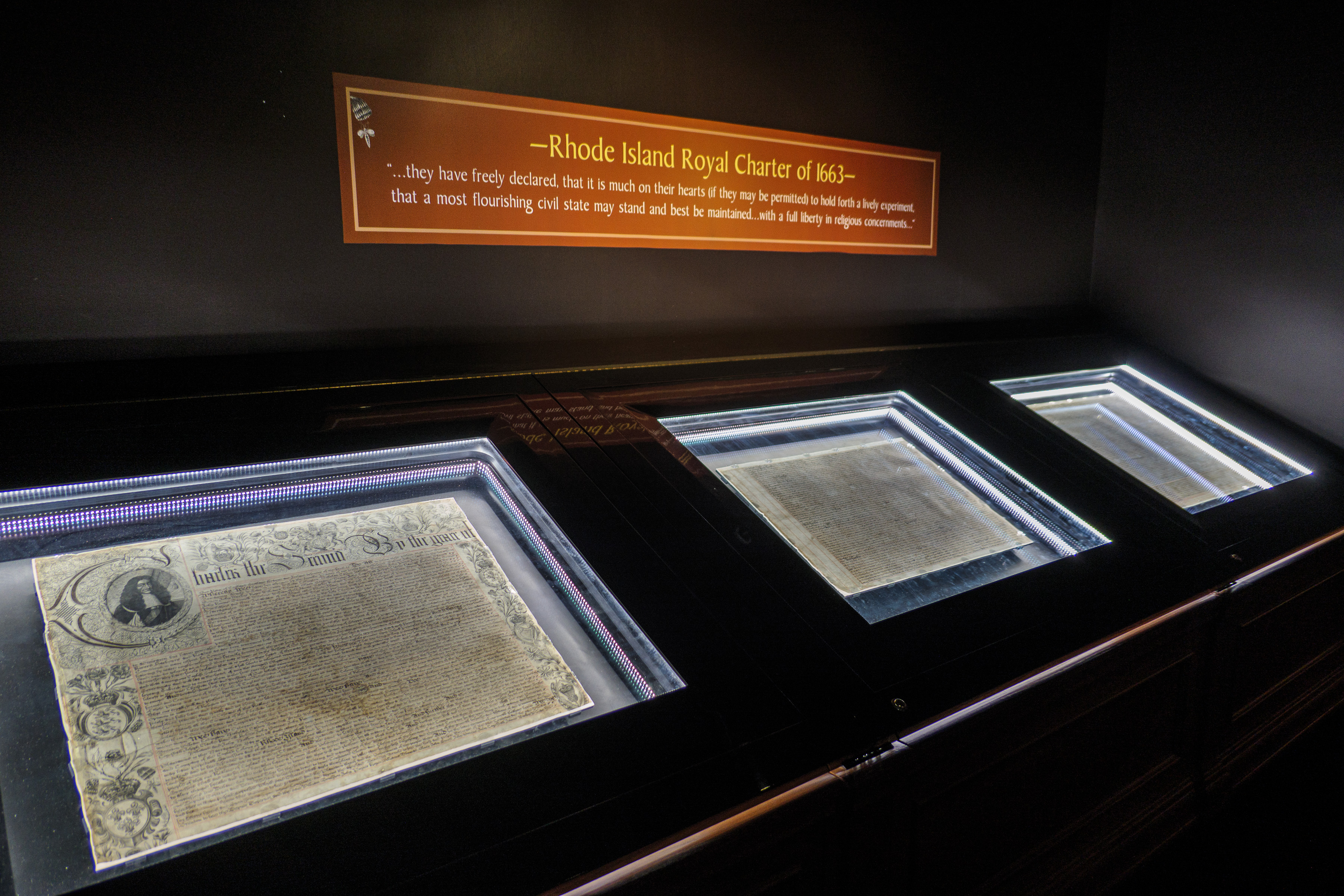
The Royal Charter exhibit after 2016 redesign

The original Royal Charter is on display at the Rhode Island State House in Providence, and a photographic copy is on display at the State Archives. The State House's charter exhibit was redesigned and rededicated in January 2016.

== See also ==
- History of Rhode Island
- List of colonial governors of Rhode Island
- List of lieutenant governors of Rhode Island
- List of early settlers of Rhode Island
