= List of early settlers of Rhode Island =

This is a collection of lists of early settlers (before 1700) in the Colony of Rhode Island and Providence Plantations. Most of the lists are of the earliest inhabitants of a particular town or area.

== Native American tribes and leaders ==
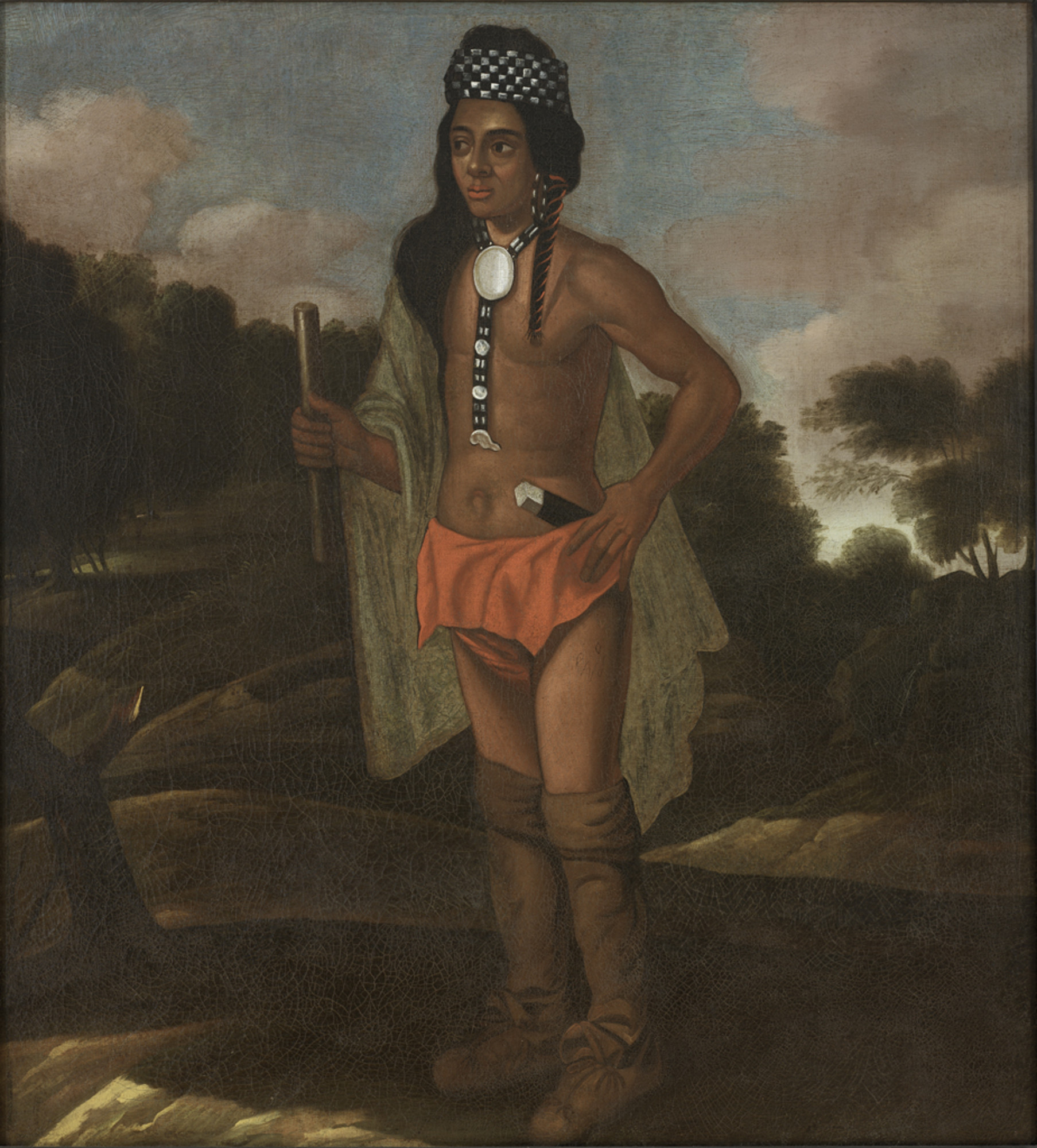
Ninigret in 1681

The following people lived in Rhode Island prior to Colonial settlement:

Wampanoag people lived throughout Plymouth Colony and around Mount Hope Bay in Bristol, Rhode Island

- Massasoit, tribal leader, met the Pilgrims at Plymouth
- Wamsutta, son of Massasoit, renamed Alexander; became tribal leader upon father's death but died shortly after
- Metacomet, son of Massasoit, renamed Philip; succeeded his brother as tribal leader; instigated King Philip's War

Narragansett people lived throughout the Rhode Island colony

- Tashtassuck, legendary sachem; ancestor of the Narragansett sachems Canonicus, Miantonomo and Pessicus, and of the Niantic sachem Ninigret
- Canonicus, chief sachem, deeded land to Roger Williams on which he established Providence Plantations
- Miantonomo, nephew of Canonicus, sold Samuel Gorton and others the land to establish Warwick, Rhode Island
- Canonchet, son of Miantonomo, led Narragansets during the Great Swamp Fight and accepted his own death at the end of King Philip's War
- Pumham, lesser sachem of Kent County, Rhode Island
- Soconoco, lesser sachem of the same area as Pumham

Niantic people lived around the Pawcatuck River in the southwestern corner of Rhode Island

- Ninigret, kept the Niantics neutral during King Philip's War
- Harman Garrett, Indian governor and nephew of Ninigret

Nipmuc people wandered within Rhode Island Colony, mostly from the north

== First European settler ==
- William Blackstone, settled along the Blackstone River in Cumberland, Rhode Island (1634–35), part of the Plymouth Colony at the time

== First settlers of Providence ==
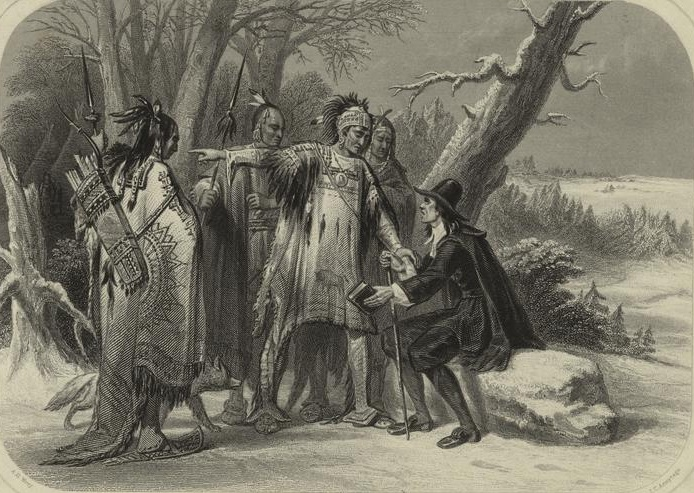
Narragansett Indians receiving Roger Williams

Roger Williams was banished from the Massachusetts Bay Colony in October 1635 but was allowed to remain at his home in Salem, Massachusetts until the end of winter, provided that he did not preach. However, his followers visited him at his home in sizable numbers, and the authorities deemed this to be preaching. They planned to apprehend him by force and put him on a ship for England in January 1636, but magistrate John Winthrop warned him privately, and he slipped away from Salem in the dead of winter to find shelter with the Wampanoags. He bought a parcel of land in Seekonk from Wampanoag sachem Massasoit which was at the western edge of the Plymouth Colony (now Rehoboth, Massachusetts). In a 1677 statement, Williams mentioned the four who were with him at Seekonk. The five members of the group were:

- Roger Williams
- William Harris
- John Smith (miller)
- Francis Wickes (a minor)
- Thomas Angell (a minor)

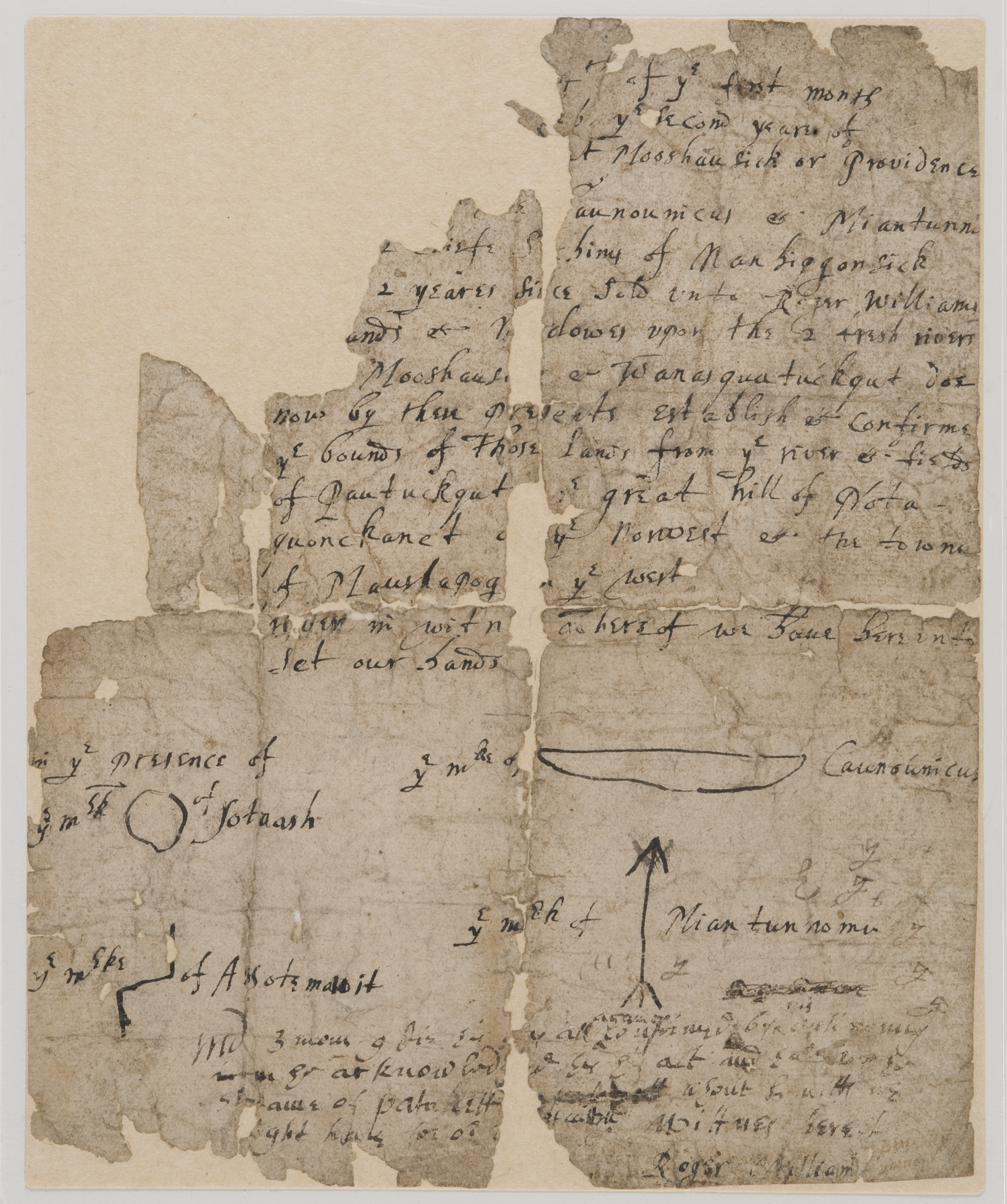
The original Sachems' Deed for Providence, signed by Canonicus

In the spring of 1636, Williams and his company planted crops at Seekonk but were informed in a gentle letter from Governor Edward Winslow of Plymouth that they were within Plymouth's jurisdiction, and this fact would cause difficulties with the Massachusetts authorities. Without urgency, Winslow suggested that Williams and his group move across the Seekonk River into the territory of the Narragansetts, where no colony had any claim. Joshua Verin wrote a statement in 1650 mentioning "we six which came first to Providence", suggesting that he was the next to join the original five. Also, Benedict Arnold later wrote, "We came to Providence to Dwell the 20th of April, 1636". The traditional date of the settlement of Providence has been given as about June 20, 1636, but this does not take into account the Arnold record. More recent analysis of the settling of Providence suggests that Williams likely negotiated with the Narragansetts for land in March 1636, and that he and his party actually settled the land in April 1636 along with the Arnold family. It is likely that the following people were the original settlers in the Narragansett territory at Providence Plantations:

- Roger Williams (his wife Mary and daughters Mary and Freeborn likely came later)
- William Harris (his wife Susannah and son Andrew likely came later)
- John Smith (his wife Alice and children John Jr. and Elizabeth likely came later)
- Francis Wickes (a minor)
- Thomas Angell (a minor)
- Joshua Verin (his wife Jane Verin may have come later);

The Arnold party, including:

- William Arnold with wife Christian, daughter Joanne, and sons Stephen and Benedict
- William Carpenter with wife Elizabeth (the daughter of William Arnold)
- William Mann with wife Frances Hopkins (the niece of William Arnold)
- Thomas Hopkins, still a minor, nephew of William Arnold (and ancestor of Governor Stephen Hopkins)

== Providence civil compact, 1637 ==
The 1637 Providence Civil Compact (sometimes referred to as the "Scott Petition") was a foundational agreement signed by thirteen settlers of the Towne of Providence in which they pledged obedience to the decisions of local government—but only in "civil things." The text of the resolution is as follows:

We, whose names are hereunder, desirous to inhabit in the town of Providence, do promise to subject ourselves in active or passive obedience to all such orders or agreements as shall be made for public good of our body, in an orderly way, by the major assent of the present inhabitants, master of families, incorporated together into a town fellowship, and others whom they shall admit unto them only in civil things.

- Richard Scott
- William Reynolds X his mark
- John Field X his mark
- Chad Browne
- John Warner
- George Richard
- Edward Cope
- Thomas Angell X his mark (now an adult)
- Thomas Harris
- Francis Wickes X his mark (now an adult)
- Benedict Arnold (now an adult)
- Joshua Winsor
- William Wickenden

== Original proprietors of Providence ==
Those named in the Initial Deed from Roger Williams, dated about October 8, 1638:

- Roger Williams
- Stukely Westcott (left Salem about March 1638)
- William Arnold
- Thomas James (was minister at Charlestown; Providence by June 1637; left for New Haven in 1639)
- Robert Coles (was earlier at Roxbury, Ipswich, and Salem)
- John Greene (had departed Boston by March 1636)
- John Throckmorton (was at Salem earlier)
- John Sweet and wife Mary (received grant of land in 1637, was at Sweet's Cove, Salem; their lot became Court Street; their son John Sweet was a settler of Warwick Colony)
- William Harris
- William Carpenter
- Thomas Olney (left Salem about March 1638)
- Francis Weston (left Salem about March 1638)
- Richard Waterman (left Salem about March 1638)
- Ezekiel Holyman (left Salem about March 1638)

== Pawtuxet settlers ==
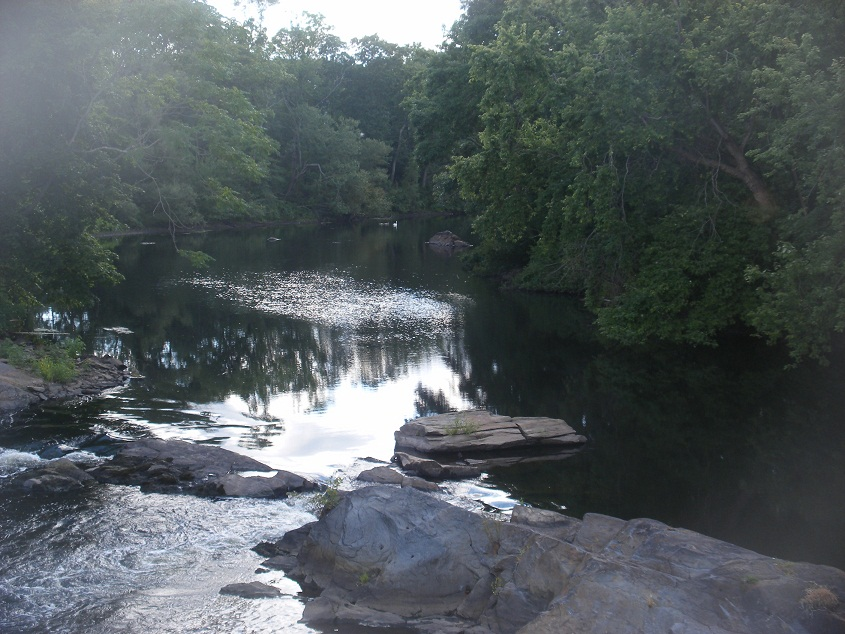
Pawtuxet River near where the Arnolds settled

Those settlers who left Providence to settle on the north side of the Pawtuxet River about 1638, putting themselves under the jurisdiction of Massachusetts Bay Colony from 1642 to 1658:

- William Arnold
- Benedict Arnold, moved to Newport in 1651
- William Carpenter
- Thomas Hopkins, did not stay long
- William Mann, did not stay long
- Robert Coles
- William Harris, did not stay long
- Zachariah Rhodes (married Joanna, daughter of William Arnold), did not stay long
- William Field, did not stay long
- Stukely Westcott, moved to Warwick about 1643

== Signers of Providence agreement for a government, 1640 ==
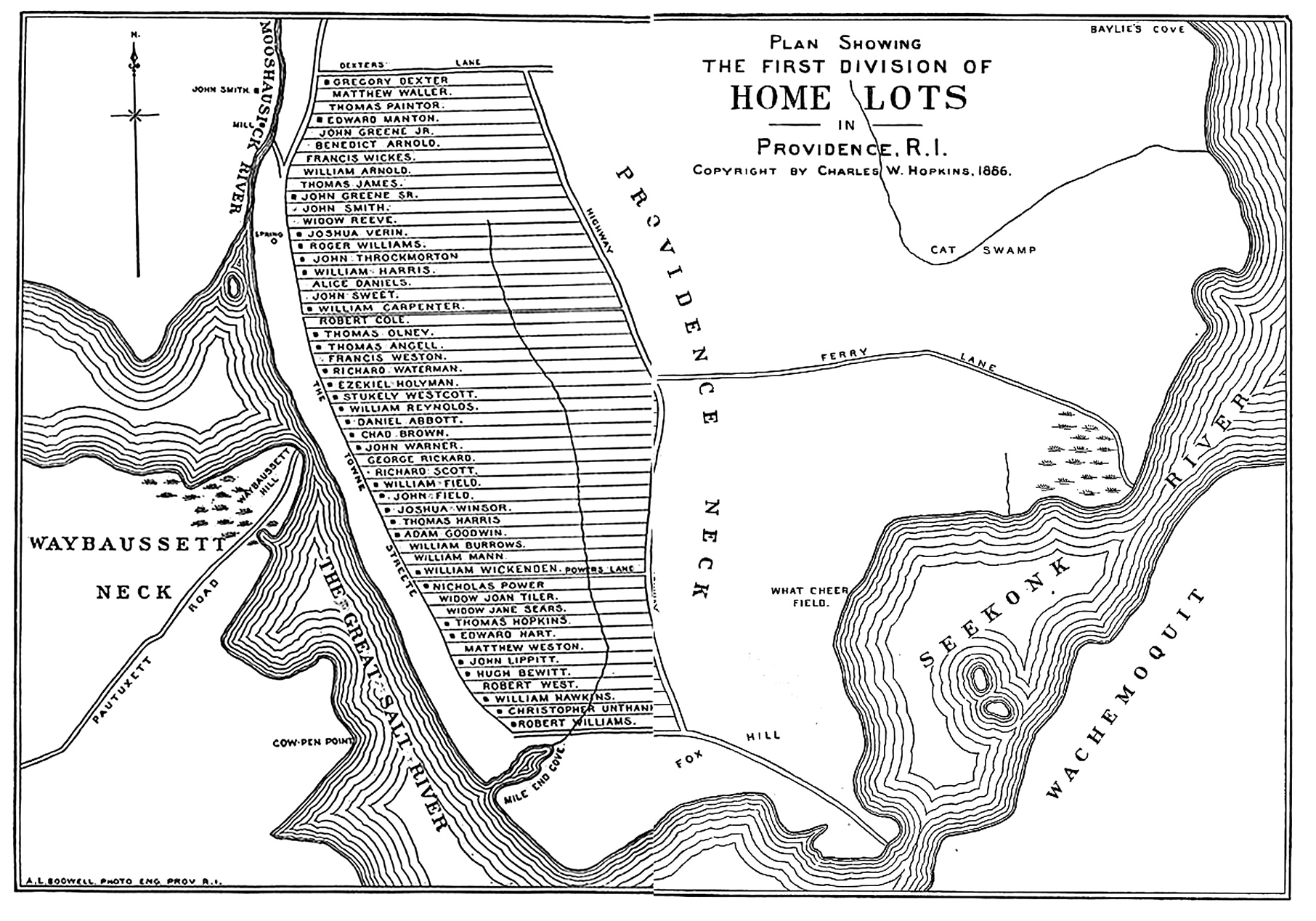
Town layout of Providence showing land plots of many of the earliest settlers

Those 39 Providence settlers who signed the Providence Combination of 1640, an agreement created on July 27, 1640:

- Chad Brown
- Robert Coles
- William Harris
- John Throckmorton
- Stukely Westcott
- Benedict Arnold
- William Carpenter
- Richard Scott
- Thomas Harris
- Francis Wickes X his mark
- Thomas Angell X his mark
- Adam Goodwin X his mark
- William Burrows X his mark
- Roger Williams
- Robert West
- Joshua Winsor
- Robert Williams
- Mathew Waller
- Gregory Dexter
- John Lippitt X his mark
- John Warner
- John Field
- William Arnold
- William Field
- Edward Cope
- Edward Manton X his mark
- William Man
- Nicholas Power
- William Reynolds X his mark
- Thomas Olney
- Richard Waterman
- William Wickenden
- Edward Hart
- Hugh Bewit
- Thomas Hopkins X his mark
- Joan Tiler (widow)
- Jane Sears X her mark (widow)
- Christopher Unthank
- William Hawkins X his mark

== Settlers of Cocumscussoc (Wickford) area ==
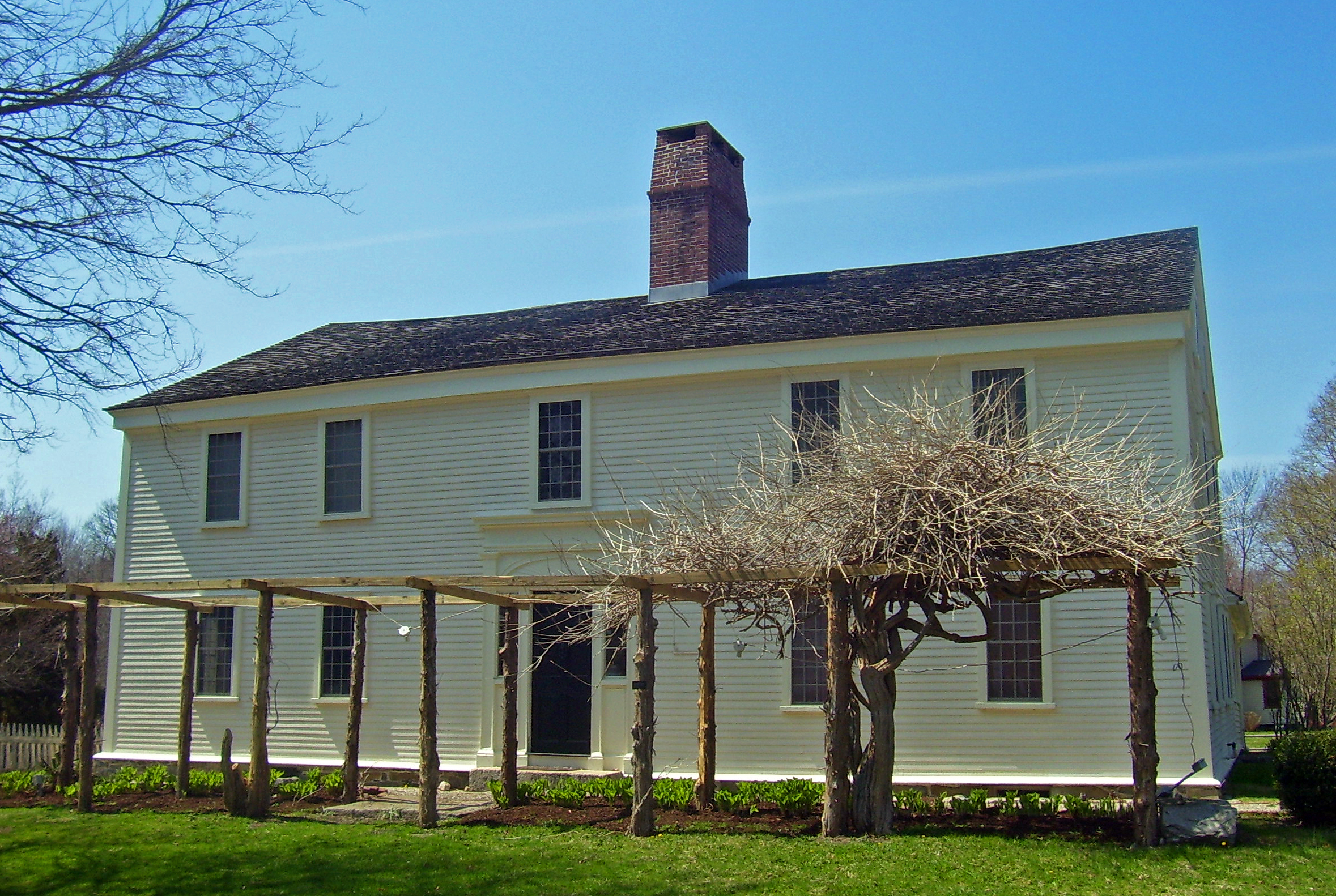
Smith's Castle, home of Richard Smith

Those early settlers who had trading posts in the area of Wickford in what was then the "Narragansett country" and later a part of North Kingstown, Rhode Island:

- Richard Smith, built a trading post established about 1637 where his house Smith's Castle still stands, rebuilt by Richard, Jr. after King Philip's War
- Roger Williams, built his trading post about a mile north from Smith's post along the Pequot Path (or Post Road) and occupied it from about 1644 to 1651 and then sold it to Smith to get funds for his proposed errand to England
- Mr. Wilcox (possibly Edward or John), built his trading post in the early 1640s in the same general area

== Founders of Portsmouth ==
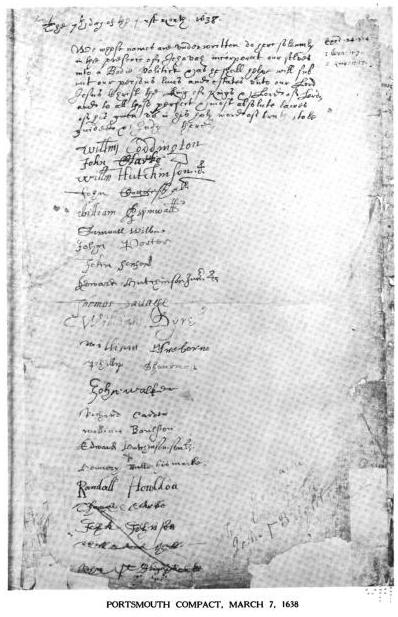
Portsmouth Compact

Supporters of Anne Hutchinson who signed the Portsmouth Compact, dated March 7, 1638:

- William Coddington
- John Clarke
- William Hutchinson, husband of Anne Hutchinson
- John Coggeshall
- William Aspinwall
- Samuel Wilbore
- John Porter
- John Sanford
- Edward Hutchinson, Jr., oldest son of William and Anne Hutchinson
- Thomas Savage
- William Dyer, husband of Mary Dyer
- William Freeborn
- Philip Shearman
- John Walker
- Richard Carder
- William Baulston
- Edward Hutchinson, Sr., brother of William Hutchinson
- Henry Bull (signed with a mark)
- Randall Holden
- Thomas Clarke
- John Johnson
- William Hall
- John Brightman

The last four names on the list were crossed out, but these men nevertheless came to Portsmouth or Newport.

== Inhabitants of Aquidneck Island (1638) ==
The following individuals were among the earliest settlers of Aquidneck Island in the Narragansett Bay; the island was officially named Rhode Island by 1644, from which the entire colony eventually took its name. The first group of 58 names appears to be settlers of Pocasset (later Portsmouth), while the second group of 42 appears to be settlers of Newport. These two lists come from Bartlett's Records of the Colony of Rhode Island, and apparently they were compiled and incorporated into the town records of Newport on November 25, 1639. The actual arrival dates of the individuals likely span over several months during 1638; a few individuals have legible dates next to their names, while several others have illegible dates.

A Catalogue of such who, by the Generall consent of the Company were admitted to be Inhabytants of the Island now called Aqueedneck, having submitted themselves to the Government that is or shall be established, according to the word of God therein [1638]

- Samuel Hutchinson
- Thomas Emons
- Richard Awards
- Edward Willcoks
- George Gardiner
- William Witherington
- Mr. Samuel Gorton
- John Wickes
- Ralph Earle
- Nicholas Browne
- Richard Burden [Borden]
- Richard Maxon
- Mr. Nicholas Esson
- Thomas Spicer
- Robert Potter
- William Nedham
- Sampson Shatton
- Adam Mott
- John Mott
- Mr. Robert Jefferyes
- Thomas Hitt
- James Tarr
- John Roome
- Robert Gilham
- Jeremy Clarke
- Nicholas Davis
- Wm. Baker
- John More
- Anthony Pain
- George Potter
- Wm. Richardson
- Wm. Quick
- Thomas Clarke
- John Johnson
- William Hall
- John Briggs
- James Davis
- George Parker
- Erasmus Bullock
- George Cleer
- Thomas Hazard
- William Cowlie
- Jeffery Champlin
- Richard Sarle
- John Sloff
- Thomas Beeder
- John Tripp
- Osamund Doutch
- John Marshall
- Robert Stanton
- Joseph Clarke
- Robert Carr
- George Layton
- John Arnold
- William Havens
- Thomas Layton
- Edward Poole
- Mathew Sutherland

"Inhabitants admitted at the Town of Nieu-port since the 20th of the 3:1638" (since 20 May 1638)

- Marmaduke Ward
- Robert Field
- Thomas Stafford
- Job Tyler
- Thomas Sauorie
- Hugh Durdall
- William Baker
- John Layton
- Mr. Will Foster
- John Hall
- Tobye Knight
- John Peckum
- Michel Williamson
- Mr. Robert Lintell
- Richard Smith
- James Rogers
- John Smith
- Wm. Parker
- John Grinman
- Edward Rero
- John Macummore
- Robert Root
- Ezekiah Meritt
- James Burt
- John Bartlett
- Edward _________
- Sampson Salter
- Nicholas Cottrell
- John Vaughan
- John Smith
- John Merchant (2 July)
- Jeremy Gould
- Enoch Hunt
- Nathaniel Adams
- Samuel Allen
- George Allen
- Ralph Allen
- Mr. Thomas Burton
- Henry Bishop
- John Hicks
- Edward Browce
- Mathew Grenell (5 August)

== Residents of Portsmouth after split with Newport ==
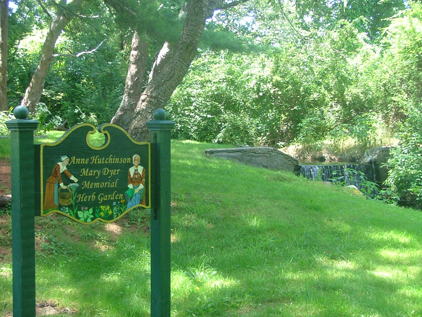
Anne Hutchinson/Mary Dyer Memorial Herb Garden at Founders' Brook Park, Portsmouth, Rhode Island

Those Portsmouth settlers who remained after the group left to found Newport and who signed an agreement for a government on April 30, 1639:

- William Hutchinson
- Samuel Gorton
- Samuel Hutchinson, did not stay long if actually here
- John Wickes
- Richard Magson
- Thomas Spicer
- John Roome
- John Geoffe (?)
- Thomas Beddar
- Erasmus Bullock
- Samson Shotten
- Ralphe Earle
- Robert Potter
- Nathaniel Potter
- George Potter
- William Havens
- George Shaw
- George Lawton
- Anthony Paine
- Job Hawkins
- Richard Awarde
- John Moore
- Nicholas Browne
- William Richardson
- John Tripp
- Thomas Layton
- Robert Stanton
- John Briggs
- James Davis
- William Aspinwall (did not sign agreement, but did remain here)

== Founders of Newport ==
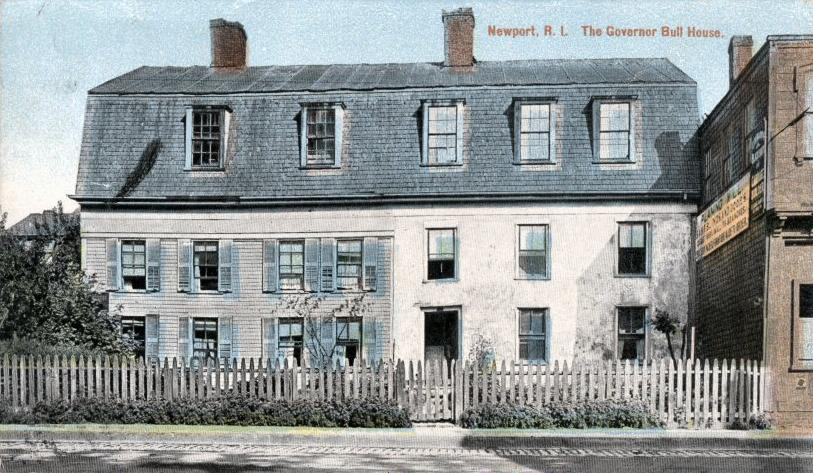
Henry Bull house, c. 1639, from a 1900 post card

Those who signed an agreement for a new government on April 28, 1639:

- William Coddington
- Nicholas Easton
- John Coggeshall
- William Brenton
- John Clarke
- Jeremy Clarke (his wife was Frances (Latham) Clarke)
- Thomas Hazard
- Henry Bull
- William Dyer

== Founders of Warwick ==
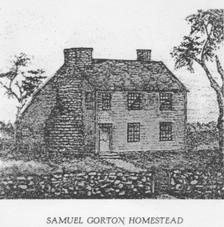
Samuel Gorton's house, built after King Philip's War

Those who purchased the land from the Indians on January 12, 1642:

- Randall Holden
- John Greene
- John Wickes
- Francis Weston
- Samuel Gorton
- Richard Waterman
- John Warner
- Richard Carder
- Samson Shotten
- Robert Potter
- William Wodell
- Nicholas Power
- John Sweet

== Pettaquamscutt purchasers ==
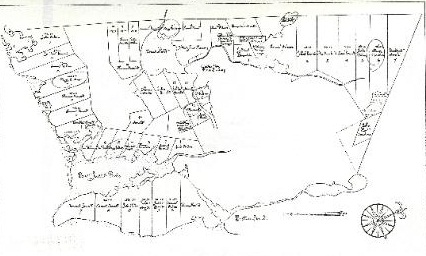
Pettaquamscutt Purchase in 1724

Those who purchased the Pettaquamscutt lands (later South Kingstown) from the Indian sachems in 1657:

Original purchasers:

- John Porter
- Samuel Wilbore
- Thomas Mumford
- Samuel Wilson
- John Hull (Boston goldsmith and minter)

Later purchasers:

- William Brenton
- Benedict Arnold

In 1659 a second group set up the Atherton Trading Company, with perceived rights to land in Narragansett, in an area south of the North Kingstown, which included Wickford. Their claim was declared void years later.

== Early inhabitants of New Shoreham (Block Island) ==
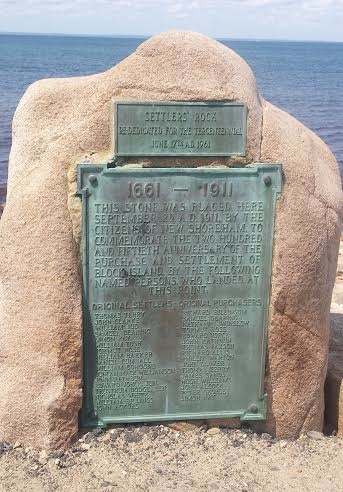
Plaque showing both the names of the original purchasers, and names of the first settlers of Block Island

The original purchasers of Block Island in April 1661, whose names appear on a plaque at the north end of the island:

- Thomas Terry
- John Clarke
- William Jud
- Samuel Dearing
- Simon Ray
- William Tosh
- Tormut Rose
- William Barker
- Daniel Cumball
- William Cohoone
- Duncan Mack Williamson
- John Rathbun
- Edward Vorce, Jun.
- Trustrum Dodge, Sen.
- Nicholas White
- William Billings
- John Ackurs (Acres).

The early settlers whose names appear on the plaque:

- Richard Billingum
- Samuel Dearing
- Nathaniel Winslow
- Tormut Rose
- Edward Vorce
- John Rathbun
- Thomas Faxson
- Richard Allis
- Phillip Warton
- John Glover
- Thomas Terry
- James Sands
- Hugh Williams
- John Alcock
- Peter George
- Simon Ray
- Trustrum Dodge was also an early settler, though his name only appears on the plaque as an original purchaser

== Those named in the Royal Charter of 1663 ==
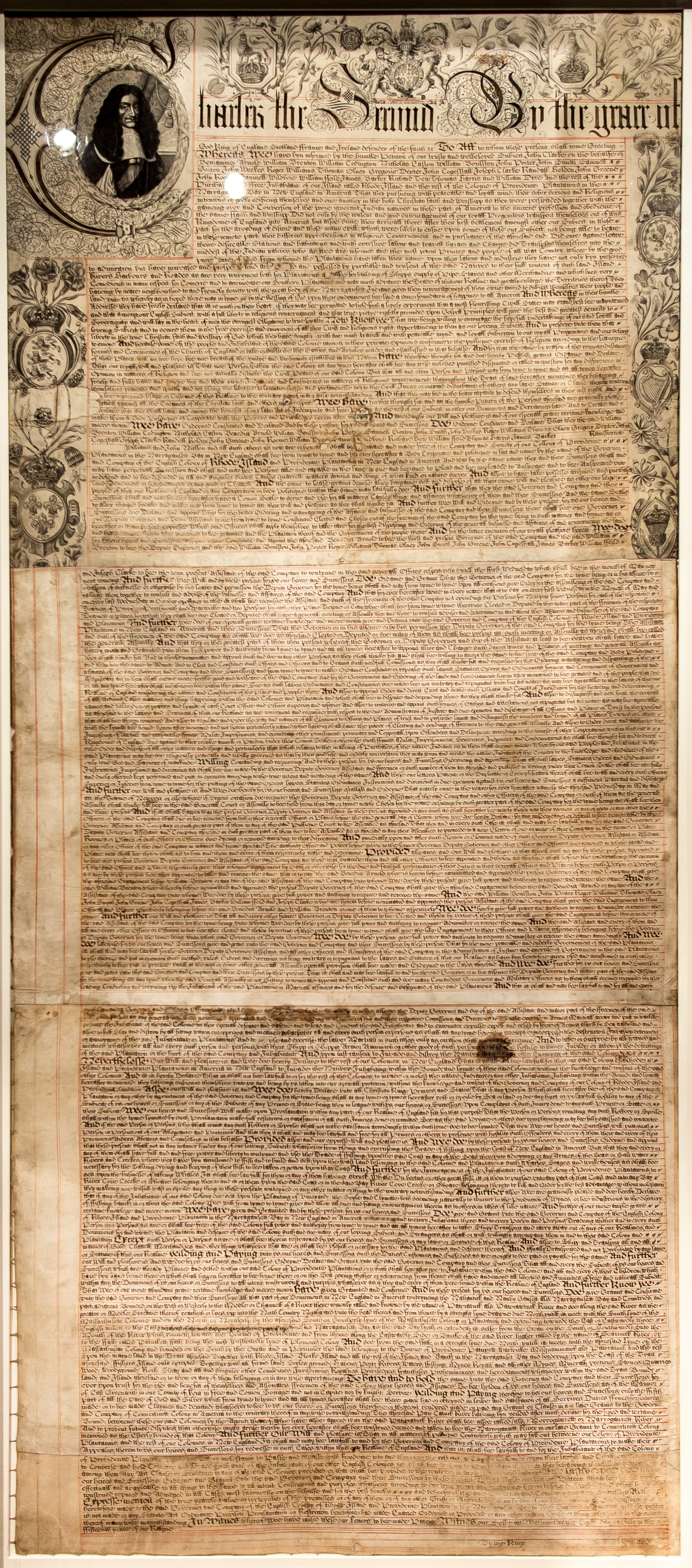
Rhode Island's Royal Charter of 1663

The early Rhode Island inhabitants named in the Rhode Island Royal Charter, dated July 8, 1663 and signed with the royal seal by King Charles II; this charter was the basis for Rhode Island's government for nearly two centuries:

- Author: John Clarke
- Governor: Benedict Arnold
- Deputy Governor: William Brenton

Assistants:

- William Baulston
- John Porter
- Roger Williams
- Thomas Olney
- John Smith
- John Greene
- John Coggeshall
- James Barker
- William Field
- Joseph Clarke

Others named in the document:

- William Codington
- Nicholas Easton
- Samuel Gorton
- John Wickes
- Gregory Dexter
- Randall Holden
- John Roome
- Samuel Wildbore
- Richard Tew
- Thomas Harris
- William Dyre
- ________ Rainsborrow (given name omitted)
- ________ Williams (this is undoubtedly Robert Williams, brother of Roger Williams)
- John Nickson

== Early inhabitants of Westerly ==
Westerly, at first called Misquamicut, was purchased on 27 August 1661 by the following Newport men: Known as the Hall & Knight Purchase:

- John Hall
- William Vaughan
- John Coggeshall, Jr.
- John Crandall
- Hugh Mosher
- James Barker
- Caleb Carr
- James Rogers
- Joseph Torry
- John Cranston

Of these men, only John Crandall appears to have settled in Westerly.

Westerly inhabitants appearing in the town records of 18 May 1669:

- John Crandall
- Edward Larkin
- Stephen Wilcox
- John Lewis
- James Cross
- Jonathan Armstrong
- John Maxson
- Jeffrey Champlin, Sr.
- John Fairfield
- Daniel Cromb
- Nicholas Cottrell
- Shubael Painter
- Tobias Saunders
- Robert Burdick
- John Randall
- John Sharp
- Daniel Stanton
- James Babcock, Sr.
- Thomas Painter
- James Babcock, Jr.
- John Babcock
- Job Babcock
- Josiah Clarke

Daniel Crombe (aka Crumb) was the progenitor of the American Crumb family that includes such notable descendants as the composer George Crumb and the cartoonist Robert Crumb.

== Colonial leaders during King Philip's War ==
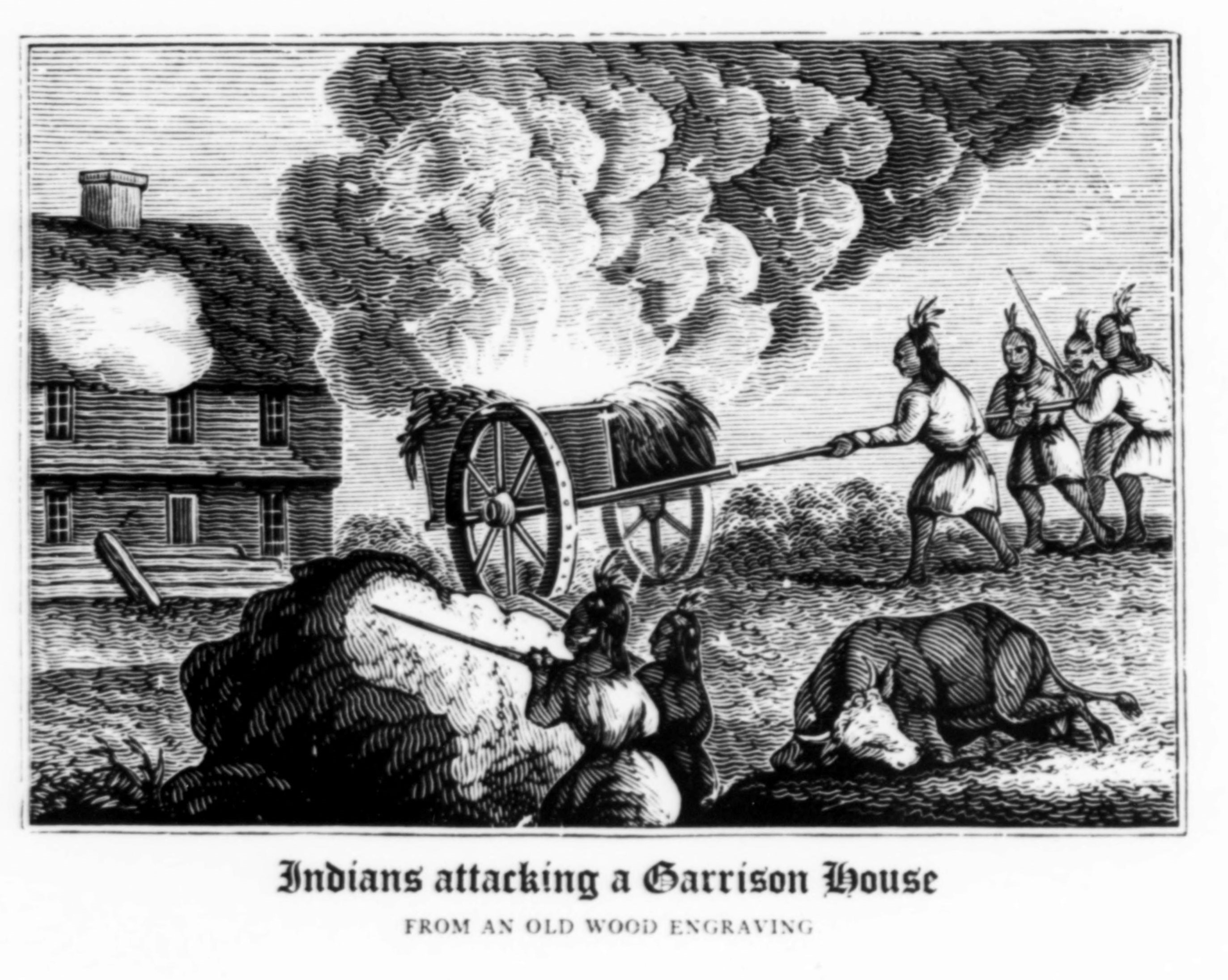
Garrison house being attacked during King Philip's War

During the devastating events of King Philip's War (1675-1676), the Rhode Island General Assembly sought the counsel of 16 prominent citizens of the colony with the resolution, "Voted that in these troublesome times and straites in this Collony, this Assembly desiringe to have the advice and concurrance of the most juditious inhabitants, if it may be had for the good of the whole, doe desire at their next sittinge the Company and Councill of":

- Benedict Arnold
- John Clarke
- James Barker
- Obadiah Holmes
- William Vaughan
- William Hiscocks
- Christopher Holder
- Phillip Shearman
- Capt. John Albro
- William Wodell
- George Lawton
- Robert Hodgson
- William Carpenter
- Gregory Dexter
- Capt. Randall Holden
- Capt. John Greene

== Original proprietors of East Greenwich ==
At a meeting of the General Assembly in Newport in May 1677, the following 48 individuals were granted 100-acre tracts in East Greenwich "for the services rendered during King Philip's War."

- John Spencer
- Thomas Nichols, father of Deputy Governor Jonathan Nichols
- Clement Weaver
- Henry Brightman
- George Vaughan
- John Weaver
- Charles Macarty
- Thomas Wood
- Thomas Frye, father of Deputy Governor Thomas Frye
- Benjamin Griffin
- Daniel Vaughan
- Thomas Dungan, son of William and Frances (Latham) Dungan
- John Pearce
- Stephen Peckham
- John Crandall, son of John Crandall
- Preserved Pearce
- Henry Lilly
- John Albro, son of John Albro
- Samuel Albro, son of John Albro
- Philip Long
- Richard Knight
- John Peckham
- Thomas Peckham
- William Clarke
- Edward Day
- Edward Richmond
- Edward Calvery
- John Heath
- Robert Havens
- John Strainge
- John Parker
- George Browne
- Richard Barnes
- Samson Ballou
- John Remington
- Jonathan Devell
- Benjamin Mowrey
- Joseph Mowrey
- William Wilbore, cousin of Samuel Wilbore
- James Eyles Pearce
- James Batty
- Benjamin Gorton, son of Samuel Gorton
- Henry Dyre, son of William and Mary Dyer
- John Knowles
- Stephen Arnold, son of William Arnold and brother of Governor Benedict Arnold
- John Sanford, son of Governor John Sanford
- William Hawkins
- John Holden, son of Randall Holden

== Early Settlers of Bristol (1680) ==
Bristol's early history began as a commercial enterprise when John Gorham was awarded 100 acres of land if it could be "honorably purchased from the indians." Gorham's enterprise succeeded on 18 Sep 1680 when four proprietors were awarded the deed to Mt. Hope Lands:

- John Walley
- Nathaniel Byfield
- Stephen Burton
- Nathaniel Oliver (sold share to Nathan Hayman)
- Nathan Hayman

On 27 Aug 1680, twelve men signed Articles agreeing to purchase lands:

- Capt. Benjamin Church
- Doctor Isaac Waldron
- Timothy Clarke
- William Ingraham
- Nathaniel Paine
- Nathaniel Reynolds
- Christopher Saunders
- John Wilkins
- Nathaniel Williams
- Samuel Woodbury
- Nathaniel Bosworth
- Benjamin Jones

On 1 Sep 1681, more than 60 families were present at the first town meeting and named these lands Bristol after Bristol, England. Bristol was originally part of Massachusetts, but it became part of Rhode Island when disputed lands were awarded to the Colony of Rhode Island in 1747.

- Eliashib Adams
- Watching Atherton
- Joseph Baster
- John Bayley
- John Birge
- Thomas Bletsoe
- Benjamin Bosworth
- Edward Bosworth
- William Brenton
- William Brown
- James Burrill
- James Burroughs (Burrows)
- David Cary (Carey)
- John Cary (Carey)
- Samuel Cobbett
- John Corps (Cope)
- Solomon Curtis
- Zachariah Curtis
- Thomas Daggett
- Jonathan Davenport
- Robert Dutch
- Jeremiah Finney
- John Finney
- Jonathan Finney
- Joseph Ford
- Anthony Fry
- Samuel Gallop
- John Gladding
- Jabez Gorham
- Richard Hammond
- Henry Hampton
- William Hedge
- William Hoar
- Jabez Howland
- Benjamin Ingell (Ingalls)
- Joseph Jacob(s)
- Daniel Landon (Langdon)
- Thomas Lewis
- John Martin Jr.
- Nicholas Mead
- George Morye (Mowrey)
- Jeremiah Osborne
- Peter Pampelion (Papillon)
- Samuel Penfield
- John Pope
- Edmund Ranger
- Increase Robinson
- John Rogers
- John Saffin
- Joseph Sandy
- John Smith
- Richard Smith
- Widdo (Elizabeth) Southard (Southworth)
- Robert Taft
- Major Robert Thompson
- William Throope
- John Thurston
- George Waldron
- Thomas Walker
- Uzal/Uzell Wardwell
- Richard White
- John Wilson
- Hugh Woodbury

== Settlers of Frenchtown ==
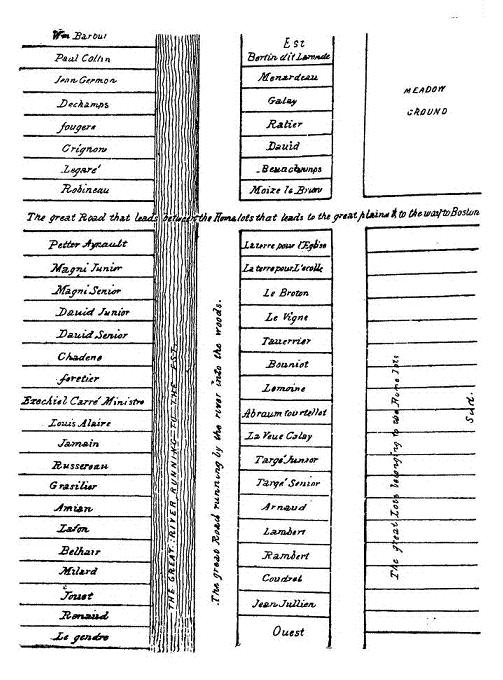
Original plat map of Frenchtown

French Huguenots settled in what is now East Greenwich in 1687. On 12 October 1686, an agreement was signed between the following, representing the French settlers and the land owners:

Representing Land Owners

- Richard Wharton
- Elisha Hutchinson (son of Edward Hutchinson)
- John Saffin

Representing Huguenot Settlers

- Ezechiel Carre'
- Peter Le Breton

Those who signed the agreement

The following individuals signed the follow-on agreement, usually giving only their surname, and these same names are found on a plat map of the settlement.

- William Barbret
- Paul Collin
- Jean Germon
- Dechamps
- Fougere
- Grignon
- Legare'
- Robineau
- Petter Ayrault
- Magni, Junior
- Magni, Senior
- Dauid, Junior
- Dauid, Senior
- Chadene
- foretier
- Ezechiel Carre', Ministre
- Louis Alaire
- Jamain
- Bussereau
- Le moine (Moses LeMoine, father of Colonel Peter Mawney)
- Abraum tourtellot
- La Veue Galay
- Targe', Junior
- Targe', Senior
- Grasilier
- Amian
- Lafon
- Belhair
- Milard
- Jouet
- Renaud
- Le gendre
- Bertin dit Laronde
- Menardeau
- Galay
- Ratier
- Dauid
- Beauchamps
- Moize le Brun
- Le Breton
- La Vigne
- Tauerrier
- Bouniot
- Arnaud
- Lambert
- Rambert
- Coudret
- Jean Julien

Also on the map are two additional lots: "La terre pour L'Eglise" (land for the church) and "La terr pour L'ecolle" (land for the school). Almost all of these people left Rhode Island to settle in Massachusetts and New York following some severe civil clashes with the English settlers. Two families remained on their original land, however:

- LeMoine (later anglicized to Money, and then Mawney)
- Targe' (which became Tourgee)

The Ayrault family moved to Newport.

== Other prominent early settlers (pre-1700) ==
- Jireh Bull, early settler of Pettaquamscutt (South Kingstown)
- Thomas Cornell (settler)
- Joseph Jenckes Jr., early settler of Pawtucket, Warwick, and Providence
- Stephen Northup, built house that remains as one of oldest in the state
- John Steere, early settler of Providence and Smithfield, Rhode Island
- Pardon Tillinghast, early pastor of the First Baptist Church in America
- John Whipple, early settler of Providence
- Reverend William Vaughn, first Baptist minister of Newport
- Reverend Thomas Dungan, Baptist minister of Newport
- Captain Arthur Fenner, established RI boundaries, military leader of the Providence Plantations during King Phillip's War

== See also ==
- History of Rhode Island
- Colony of Rhode Island and Providence Plantations
