= George Lawton (settler) =

Colonial Rhode Island settler (1607–1693)

- Born: baptized 23 September 1607; Cranfield, Bedfordshire, England
- Died: 5 October 1693; Portsmouth, Rhode Island
- Spouse: Elizabeth Hazard
- Children: Isabel, John, Mary, George, Robert, Susanna, Ruth, Mercy, Job, Elizabeth
- Parent(s): George Lawton and Isabel Smith

George Lawton (1607-1693) was an early settler of Portsmouth in the Colony of Rhode Island and Providence Plantations. Late in life Lawton became active in the affairs of the colony, and served for several years as both Deputy to the General Assembly, and Assistant to the governor. His house was sometimes used for meetings of colonial leaders and committees. He became such a highly esteemed member of the colony, that in 1676 he was one of 16 individuals whose counsel was requested by the General Assembly during the chaotic events of King Philip's War.

== Life ==
Baptized in the parish of Cranfield in Bedfordshire, England on 23 September 1607, George Lawton was the oldest of eight children of George Lawton and Isabel Smith. About 1637 he left England for New England, probably accompanied by his younger brother Thomas. In 1638 Lawton was accepted as an inhabitant of Aquidneck Island, in what was soon to become the town of Portsmouth in the Colony of Rhode Island and Providence Plantations. Dissension arose among the leaders of this colony, and in April 1639 a group of nine individuals signed an agreement for a government and moved to the south end of the island to establish the town of Newport. Within days of this, on 30 April, Lawton was one of 29 inhabitants remaining in Portsmouth who signed their own compact for a government. In 1648 he was granted 40 acres of land, near that of his brother Thomas, and this same year he became a member of the Court of Trials. His name appears on a list of Portsmouth freemen in 1655, and in 1665 he became involved in the service of the colony as a Deputy to the General Assembly, a position he held for five of the next 15 years. Lawton had a land interest in Conanicut Island (now Jamestown, Rhode Island), and in March 1672 sold 24 acres to merchant Richard Smith of Newport.

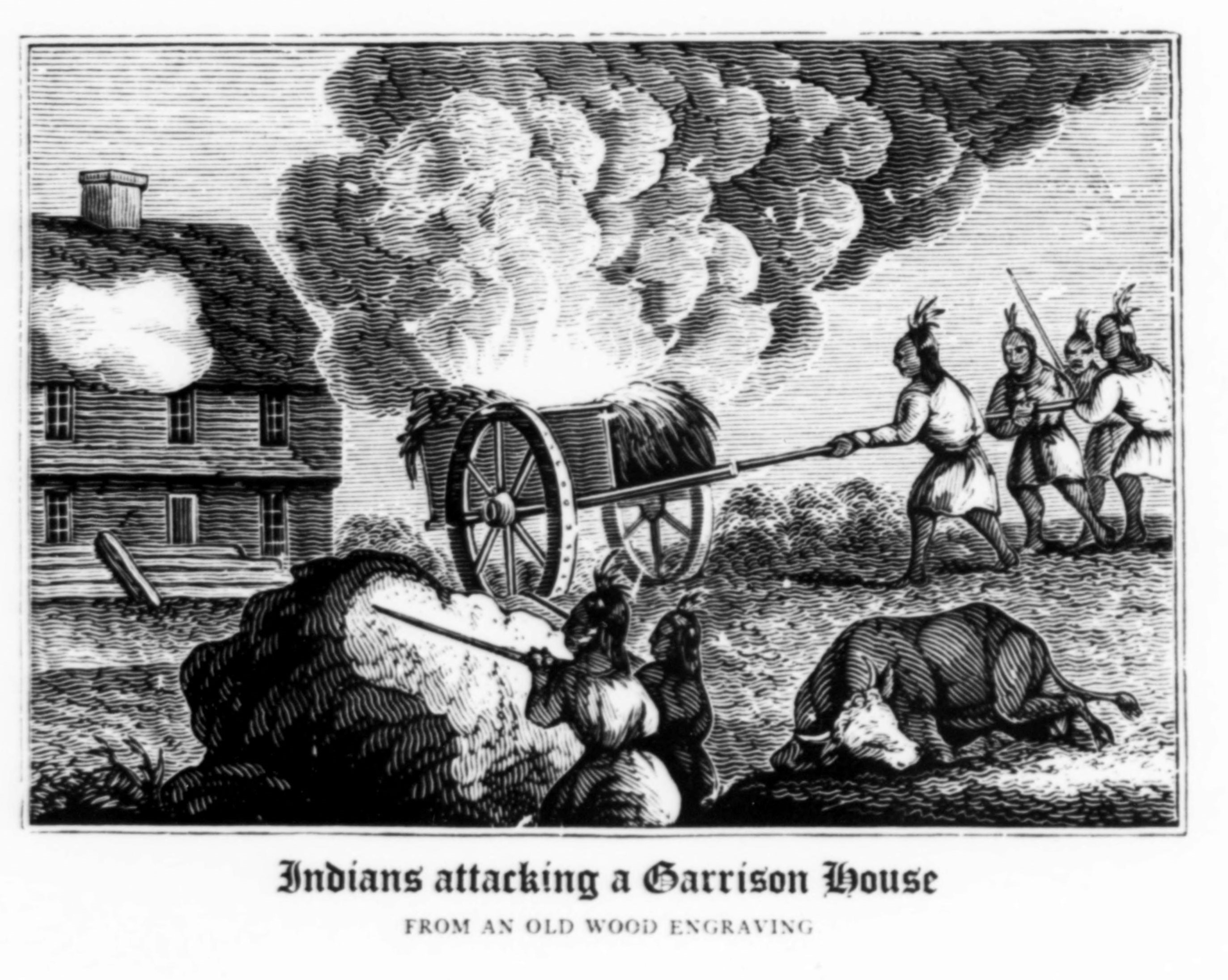
Lawton was one of 16 prominent citizens whose counsel was sought during King Philip's War.

The year 1675 brought about the beginning of King Philip's War, the most devastating event to occur in the Rhode Island colony prior to the American Revolutionary War. During this war all of Warwick, all of Pawtuxet, and much of Providence were destroyed. In April 1676 the General Assembly voted "That in these troublesome times and straits in this colony, the Assembly desiring to have the advice and concurrence of the most judicious inhabitants, if it may be had for the good of the whole, do desire at their next sitting, the company and counsel of.." and 16 names are thereafter written, among which is the name of George Lawton. In May 1676 Lawton and John Easton were directed to go to Providence to determine if garrison houses there should be maintained at the colony's expense. In October 1678 the Assembly determined that a meeting was to be held at Lawton's house the following January to audit the accounts between Newport and Portsmouth concerning the expenses from the recent war.

In May 1680 Lawton and two others were empowered to purchase a bell for the colony, to be used for giving notice of the sittings of the assemblies, courts of trial, and general councils. Previously these assemblies were gathered by drum beat. A bell was purchased for £3 10s from Freelove Arnold, the daughter of the late Governor Benedict Arnold.

In 1680 Lawton was elected to the position of Assistant, and held this position for seven of the next ten years. In January 1690 he was one of six Assistants who drafted a letter to the new English monarchs, William III and Mary II, congratulating them for their accession to the throne, and also mentioning the seizure of Governor Andros in Rhode Island, and his removal to Massachusetts for trial.

Lawton died on 5 October 1693 and was buried in his orchard in Portsmouth.

== Family ==
Although the exact date is unknown, it is believed that in 1647 Lawton married the much younger Elizabeth Hazard, the daughter of early Newport founder Thomas Hazard (Lawton may have been older than his father-in-law). The couple had ten known children, of whom Isabel married Major John Albro, Mary married John Babcock, and John married Mary Boomer. George married Naomi Hunt, Robert married Mary Wodell, and Ruth married William Wodell. Susanna married Thomas Cornell, Mercy married James Tripp, Elizabeth married Robert Carr, Jr., and Job did not marry.

Lawton's brother, Thomas Lawton (1614-c.1681) was also an early inhabitant of Portsmouth. Among George Lawton's descendants is Gideon Cornell, the first Chief Justice of the Rhode Island Supreme Court.

== See also ==
- List of early settlers of Rhode Island
- Colony of Rhode Island and Providence Plantations
