= Governor Cranston =

Governor Cranston may refer to:

- John Cranston (governor) (1625–1680), Governor of the Colony of Rhode Island and Providence Plantations from 1678 to 1680
- Samuel Cranston (1659–1727), Governor of the Colony of Rhode Island and Providence Plantations from 1698 to 1727
