= John Whipple =

John Whipple may refer to:

- John Adams Whipple, American inventor and early photographer
- John Whipple (settler), early settler of Dorchester in the Massachusetts Bay Colony
