= Thomas Angell =

Early settler in New England

- Born: c. 1616; England
- Died: 1694 (aged 77–78); Providence, Rhode Island, British America
- Spouse: Alice Ashton
- Children: John, Anphilis, Mary, Deborah, Alice, James, Hope, Margaret

Thomas Angell (c.1616–1694) was one of the first settlers of Providence Plantation in what became the Colony of Rhode Island and Providence Plantations, and his name appears on several of the town's earliest documents. Angell Street on Providence's East Side is named for him.

== Life ==
Thomas Angell probably came to the new settlement of Providence Plantation in 1637, as his name was listed on a document there in early 1638. Starting in late 1638, he and 12 other men signed a compact which offered civil equality with the earlier settlers of the town. One of Thomas Angell's grandsons believed that Thomas was one of Roger Williams's initial companions who settled Providence in 1636, but twentieth-century scholars showed that this family legend could not have been true.

On 27 July 1640, Thomas Angell was one of 39 inhabitants of Providence who signed a document for a form of government; he signed by mark.

In 1652, Angell was selected as a commissioner, and he was a juryman in 1655 and also served as constable. Also in 1655, his name appears on a list of freemen within the colony. His name last appears on a public record in 1685 when he and his son James were taxed. He wrote his will in May 1685 but he lived until 1694, when his will was proved in September of that year.

== Family ==
Angell married Alice Ashton, the daughter of James Ashton of Saint Albans in Hertfordshire, England. Alice's sister Mary married Thomas Olney, another Providence settler, and her brother James also came to New England. Thomas and Alice had eight children. Their daughter Alice married Eleazer Whipple, the son of John and Sarah Whipple and brother of Colonel Joseph Whipple, and their daughter Margaret married Jonathan, another son of John and Sarah Whipple. Their son James married Abigail Dexter, the daughter of colonial President Gregory Dexter. His descendant James Burrill Angell was the president of the University of Vermont and the University of Michigan, as well as an ambassador to China and Turkey.

== See also ==
- List of early settlers of Rhode Island
- Colony of Rhode Island and Providence Plantations
