= Joseph Whipple =

Col. Joseph Whipple Sr.
- Born: 1662; Providence, Rhode Island
- Died: 28 April 1746 (aged 83–84); Providence, Rhode Island
- Resting place: North Burial Ground, Providence
- Occupations: Deputy, Councilman, Assistant, Colonel
- Spouse: Alice Smith
- Children: John, Jeremiah, Joseph, Anphillis, Sarah, Susannah, Freelove, Alice, Amey, Christopher, Mary, Christopher

Col. Joseph Whipple Sr. (1662 – 28 April 1746) was a wealthy merchant in the Colony of Rhode Island and Providence Plantations, and active in the civil affairs of the colony during the first half of the 18th century. The son of John Whipple and Sarah Whipple, who were early settlers of Dorchester in the Massachusetts Bay Colony and later of Providence, Whipple was born in Providence, the 10th of 11 children. He began his public service to the colony in 1698, selected as a Deputy from Providence, and served in that capacity for a majority of the years until 1728. He also served on the Providence Town Council for 15 years between 1703 and 1729, and was an Assistant in 1714. From 1719 to 1720 he was Colonel of the regiment of militia for the mainland. In 1696 he and others were granted a lot on which to build a schoolhouse, and in 1710 he was licensed to keep a public house, paying 20 shillings for the privilege. Whipple died in 1746, leaving a sizable estate to his children and grandchildren. He was buried in the North Burial Ground in Providence.

Whipple married Alice, the daughter of Edward and Anphillis (Angell) Smith, and granddaughter of Thomas Angell who was one of the five men who accompanied Roger Williams in settling Providence. Together they had 12 children, the third of whom was Joseph Jr. who became a Deputy Governor of the colony and a very wealthy merchant. Whipple's sister, Abigail, with her husband William Hopkins, were grandparents of Rhode Island Governor and signer of the Declaration of Independence, Stephen Hopkins, and Whipple's granddaughter, Mary Gibbs, married John Hopkins, a son of Stephen.

== See also ==
- List of lieutenant governors of Rhode Island
- Colony of Rhode Island and Providence Plantations

== Images ==
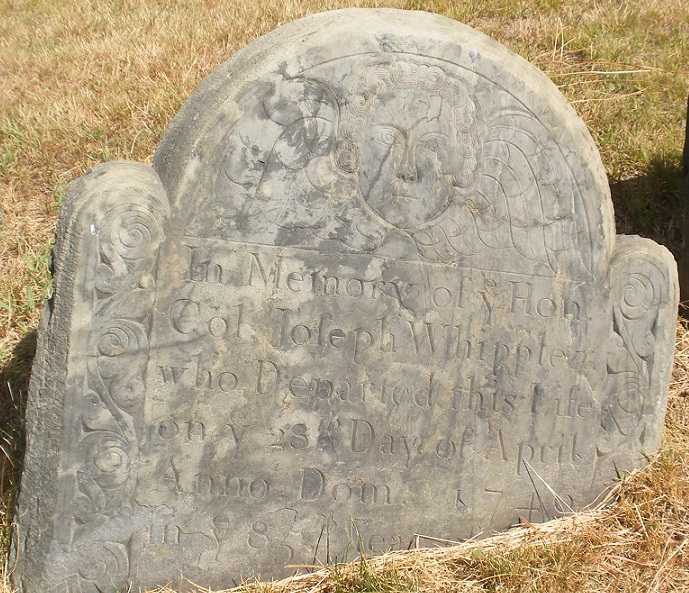
Joseph Whipple grave marker, North Burial Ground, Providence

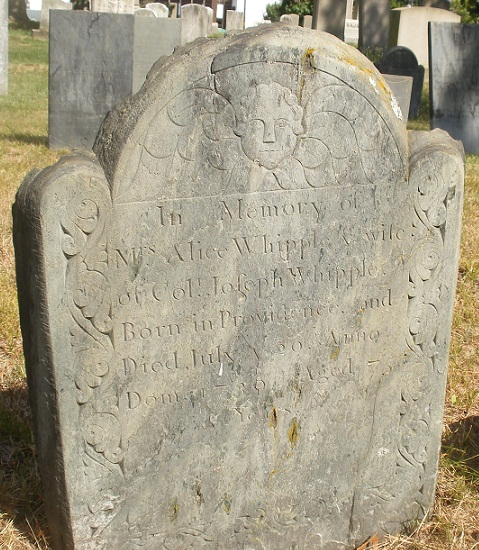
Alice, wife of Joseph Whipple, North Burial Ground

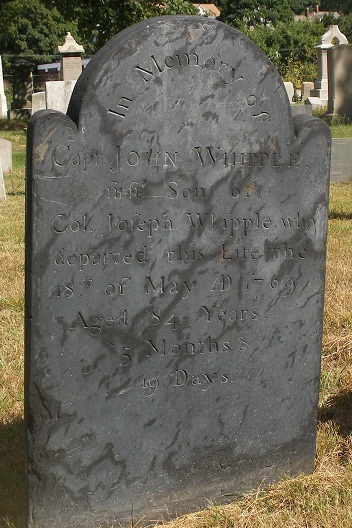
Captain John Whipple, son of Colonel Joseph and Alice Whipple, North Burial Ground
