= Francis Weekes (settler) =

First settler of Providence, Rhode Island

- Born: c. 1616; England
- Died: 1688/1689; Oyster Bay, Long Island
- Burial place: Weekes Cemetery, Oyster Bay Cove, Long Island; 40.86996°N 73.52182°W
- Known for: First settler of Providence
- Spouse: Elizabeth (unknown surname)
- Children: 8

The mark of Francis Weekes 1656

Francis Weekes (c. 1616 – 1688/1689), also spelled Wickes or Weeks, was a founding settler of Providence in what would become the Colony of Rhode Island and Providence Plantations.

== Life ==
=== Early life and immigration ===
Weekes immigrated from England, likely arriving in New England around 1635. According to historian Howard M. Chapin, he was probably born around 1616 and came as a servant or apprentice to John Smith, the miller, initially residing with or working for him in Dorchester, Massachusetts.

=== Providence settlement ===
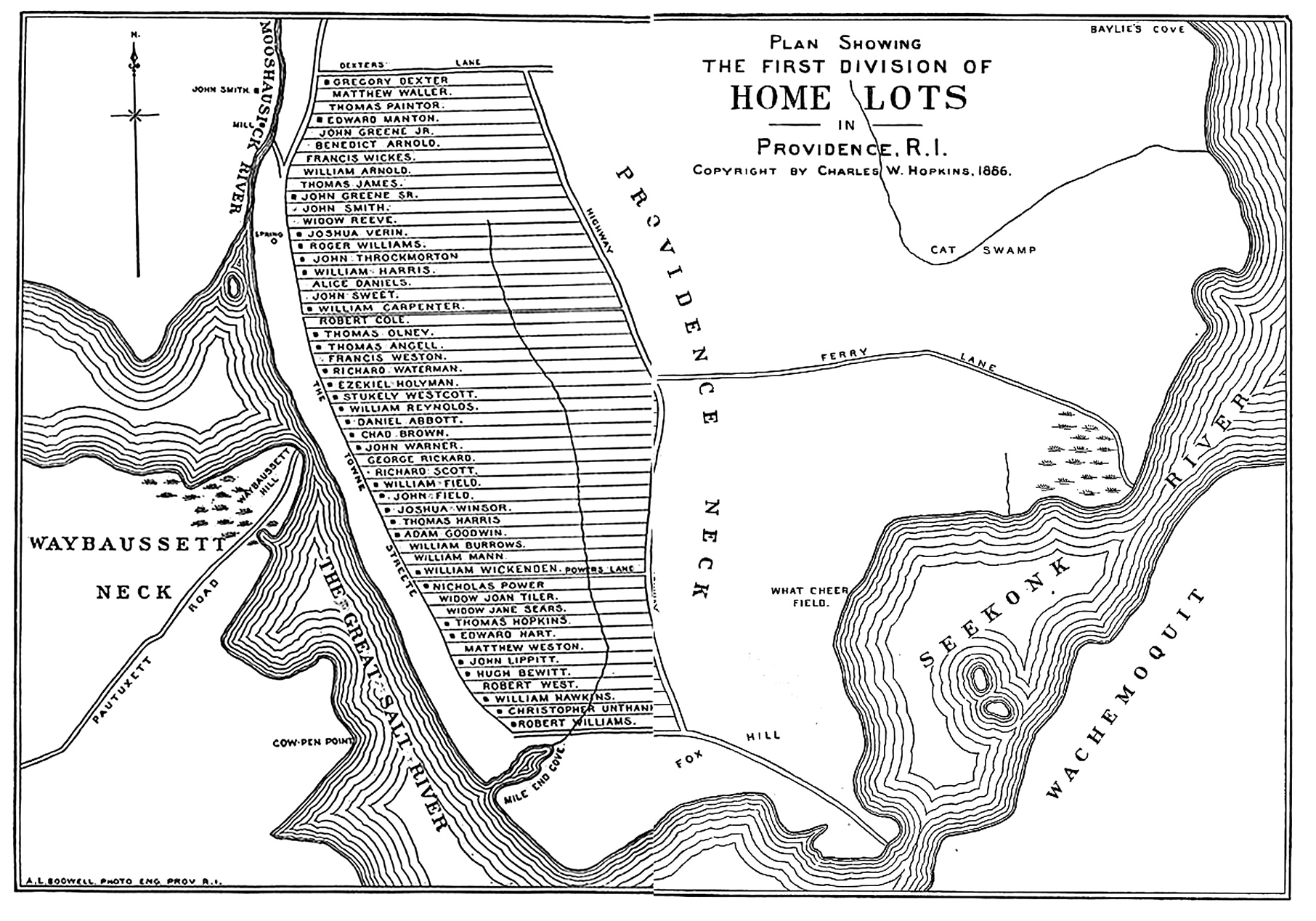
Weekes' home lot is the 7th from the top.

In 1677 court testimony, Roger Williams described how Francis Weekes joined his expedition to found Providence: "I consented to John Smith, miller at Dorchester (banished also) to go with me and at Smith's desire, to a poor young fellow, Francis Wickes, as also a lad of Richard Waterman's." Weekes was one of five men who accompanied Williams in founding Providence in 1636. As a minor at the time, his name does not appear on the original deed, but he received a home lot on Towne Street (later Main Street). In addition to his 6-acre lot, Weekes subsequently acquired 60 acres at a small brook, 5 acres at Saxifrage by the water side, and 20 acres on the "hether Plaine" adjoining Robert Williams' land.

Weekes signed both the 1637 Compact and the 1640 Combination with his mark, as he was unable to write. The 1640 Combination represents the last record of his presence in Providence, though he was granted land in subsequent divisions.

His Providence home lot later became the property of John Whipple by 1663, and was located where the old Whipple Tavern stood at 369 North Main Street.

=== Long Island years ===
Weekes left Providence around 1641 and moved to New Amsterdam, where his family lived before relocating to Gravesend, Long Island around 1645, where he was among the original lot owners in Lady Deborah Moody's planned settlement. On 25 March 1650, he was appointed arbitrator in a dispute between Thomas Cornell and Lady Moody. In 1657, he served as a selectman in Hempstead, Long Island, where town records show he owned cattle and maintained significant landholdings.

By 1661, the Weekes family had settled in Oyster Bay, Long Island, where Francis owned a home, a home lot, and ten acres of farmland. Around 1673, he moved to a homestead located half a mile east in Oyster Bay Cove, where he spent his remaining years.

In Oyster Bay, Weekes served in various civic roles, including as surveyor and arbitrator of land disputes. In 1664, he was chosen along with Jacob Young and John Cole to negotiate the purchase of Matinecock land from local Native Americans.

In 1673, Weekes divided his lands among his sons through a series of deeds, reserving his homestead for his youngest son Daniel with the stipulation that Daniel provide him with "two Bushels of good Winter wheat yearly, and every year during my natural life and eight Bushels of Endian corn, and ye moiety, or half of ye fruit of my orchard yearly during my life."

== Family ==
Weekes married Elizabeth (surname unknown) around 1640. They had eight children born between 1641 and 1654, whose baptisms were recorded at the Dutch Reformed Church in New Amsterdam.

Elizabeth Weekes became a Quaker and was fined in 1658 in Hempstead for attending a meeting in the woods with Quakers. The fine was levied for "absenting herself from public worship and profaning the Lord's day."

== Death and legacy ==
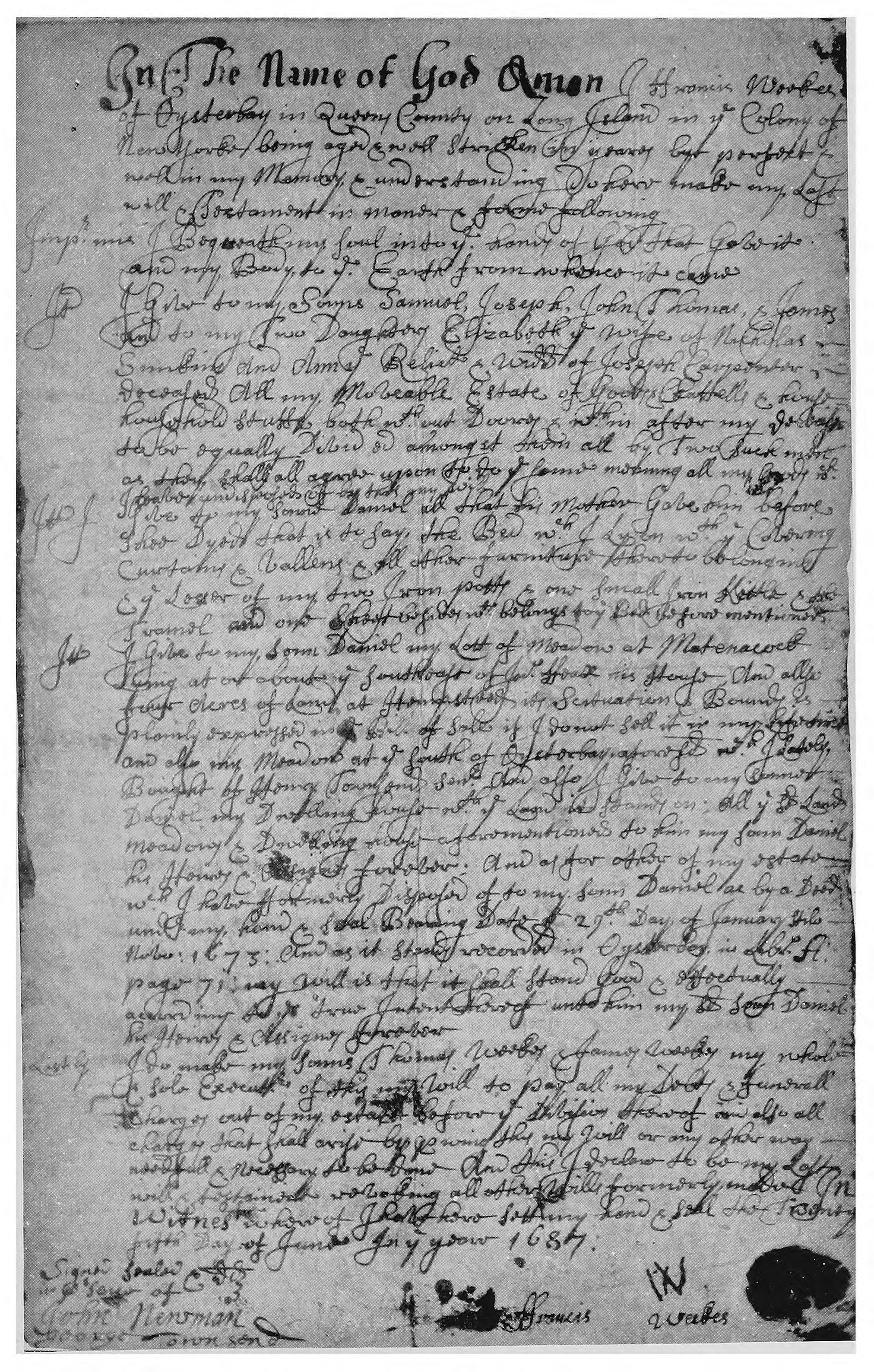
Will of Francis Weekes, dated 25 June 1687

Weekes made his will on 25 June 1687, with a codicil added concerning his son Daniel, who was serving as a soldier at Albany. The codicil addressed the disposition of Daniel's inheritance should he not return from military service. The original will was signed with his mark—a "W" with "Francis Weekes" written beneath it. He died during the winter of 1688–1689 and was buried in the family graveyard on the hill above his homestead.

The Weekes Cemetery is on the east side of Sandy Hill Road in Oyster Bay Cove and contains the remains of six generations of his descendants. In his will, Francis Weekes referred to "ye bewing place, wch is to be left free for ever for ye use of my Gennera" (the burying place, which is to be left free forever for the use of my generation). The last member of the Weeks family to be buried there was Charles Weeks, his 4th great-grandson, who died in 1831. The cemetery was also used by the Latten, Albertson, Parish, Ludlam, Smith, and other families.

A street in Oyster Bay is named Weeks Avenue and there is a Weeks Point on Oyster Bay Cove.

== Bibliography ==
- Bicknell, Thomas Williams (1920). The History of the State of Rhode Island and Providence Plantations. American Historical Society. p. 145.
- Chapin, Howard M. (1916). Documentary History of Rhode Island. Preston & Rounds.
- Chapin, Howard M. (1922). "Francis Weekes". Rhode Island Historical Society Collections.
- Field, Edward (1902). State of Rhode Island and Providence Plantations at the End of the Century: The sea force in war time. Mason Publishing Company. p. 33.
- Hopkins, Charles Wyman (1886). The home lots of the early settlers of the Providence Plantations : with notes and plats. Providence Press Co. pp. 3, 23.
- Smith, Herbert F. (1932). "Weekes and Wickes of Long Island". The American Genealogist. 9: 77–80.
- "Historic Cemeteries of Oyster Bay" (PDF). Town of Oyster Bay. 2013.
- Weekes, Alice Delano (1922). "Francis Weekes". The New York Genealogical and Biographical Record. 53: 281–282.
