= Thomas Mumford =

- Born: 1625
- Died: 1692; South Kingstown, Rhode Island
- Spouse: Sarah Sherman

Coat of Arms of Thomas Mumford

Thomas Mumford (1625–1692) is the progenitor of the Mumford family that left England and settled in Rhode Island. He was one of the earliest settlers in Rhode Island.

Mumford and several other men participated in "the Pettaquamscutt purchase" which secured a large tract of land along Narragansett Bay for the English colonists. This area now includes the towns of North and South Kingstown, RI. In 1664 Mumford was appointed High Sheriff of the region, in 1665 the Inspector General. During King Philip's War the Great Swamp Fight occurred on Mumford's land. The battle dealt a severe blow to the Narragansett Indian tribe from which they never fully recovered. From 1683 to 1686 he served as the High Constable of the colony.

In 1655 Mumford married Sarah Sherman, daughter of Philip Sherman, a prominent leader in early Rhode Island. The daughter of Philip Sherman and Sarah Odding, Sarah Sherman was born on 26 April 1636 in Roxbury, Suffolk County, Massachusetts.

Mumford died in 1692 in South Kingstown, RI.

Mumford was also jailed in Boston for speaking out on behalf of the king.

== See also ==
- List of early settlers of Rhode Island
- Colony of Rhode Island and Providence Plantations
