= Thomas Hazard =

17th-century American colonist & settler

- Born: by 1610 possibly Dorsetshire, England
- Died: after 1677; Portsmouth, Rhode Island
- Other name: Thomas Hassard
- Education: Signed name with a mark
- Occupation: Ship carpenter
- Spouse(s): (1) Martha Potter (2) Martha (_______) Sheriff
- Children: Robert, Elizabeth, Hannah, Martha

Thomas Hazard (1610^{[a]} - after 1677) was one of the nine founding settlers of Newport on Aquidneck Island (Rhode Island) in the Colony of Rhode Island and Providence Plantations. He settled in Boston and Portsmouth before settling Newport, but later returned to Portsmouth. He was the progenitor of the Hazard Family, and his descendants include Commodores Oliver Hazard Perry and Matthew C. Perry and three colonial Rhode Island deputy governors.

== Life ==
Coat of Arms of Thomas Hazard

Thomas Hazard was a founding settler of Newport, Rhode Island, who, upon arriving from England, first settled in Boston, and then came to Portsmouth before settling in Newport. Moriarity suggested that he had come from Dorsetshire, England, but Anderson concluded there is insufficient evidence for this assertion. He was a ship carpenter, and was in Boston in the Massachusetts Bay Colony as early as 1635, and admitted to the church there on 22 May 1636. He was made a freeman of Boston in 1636, but by 1638 he was admitted as an inhabitant of Portsmouth on Aquidneck Island, where many followers of Anne Hutchinson had settled.

On 28 April 1639, he and eight others signed a compact, and soon established the town of Newport at the southern end of Aquidneck Island. Once there, he was named as one of four assigned to proportion the land, and to collect four pence for each acre laid out. In September he was made a freeman of Newport, and the following March was a member of the general court of elections. On 20 June 1644 he sold to Henry Bull certain parcels of land that had been granted to him by the freemen of Newport.

In 1655 Hazard was once again in Portsmouth, where his name appears on a list of freemen, and where, in 1658, he deeded land to Stephen Wilcox, who married his daughter Hannah. The same year he was chosen to sit on the colony's petit jury, but was fined five shillings for not serving.

Hazard wrote a will on 30 November 1669, naming his son and his three married daughters. His circumstances later changed, and on 13 November 1676 he wrote another will with much different provisions (see Family, below). He was still alive on 6 August 1677 when he further modified his estate plans. Austin has him paying a tax in 1680, but Anderson does not find this to be valid.

== Family ==
Hazard first married a woman named Martha, about whom little is known. Based on the probable birth dates of his children, his wife and at least two children likely sailed with him from England to New England. Hazard had a friendly relationship with Thomas Sheriff of Portsmouth, and when the latter died, Hazard married, as his second wife, Sheriff's widow, also named Martha. In his first will in 1669, Hazard made his son executor, and named all three daughters, but in his later will, his son and daughters were disinherited, with all of his estate going to his "beloved yoakfellow Martha Hassard now living." Following Hazard's death, his widow then married Lewis Hues, who abandoned her within a few weeks, apparently "taking away great part of her estate, that was hers in her former husband's time."

Of Hazard's four known children, Robert married Mary Brownell; Elizabeth married George Lawton; Hannah married Stephen Wilcox; and Martha married first Ichabod Potter, and later married Benjamin Mowry. Hazard's great grandson, George Hazard was the deputy governor of the Rhode Island colony from 1734 to 1738, and his great grandson Robert Hazard was the deputy governor from 1750 to 1751. Colonial deputy governor Jonathan Nichols, Jr., and the first Chief Justice of the Rhode Island Supreme Court, Gideon Cornell were descendants, as were the brothers, Commodore Oliver Hazard Perry and Commodore Matthew C. Perry.

Most early writers on the family suggest that Hazard was the same person as a Thomas Hazard living in Newtown on Long Island, but Anderson presents evidence that the two are different men.

== See also ==
- List of early settlers of Rhode Island
- Colony of Rhode Island and Providence Plantations
