= John Smith (settler) =

Founding settler of Rhode Island

- Born: c. 1595; England
- Died: 1649 (aged 53–54); Providence
- Occupation: miller
- Known for: Among the first 5 settlers of Providence
- Spouse: Alice
- Children: Elizabeth and John Jr.

The mark of John Smith
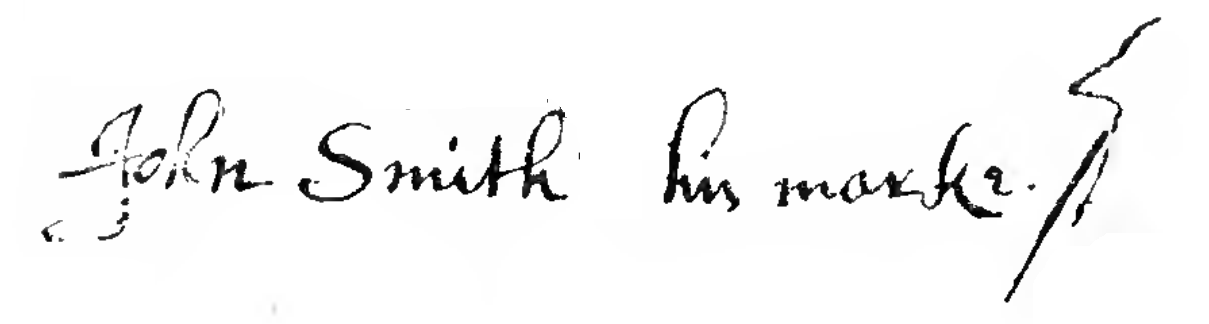

John Smith (c. 1595 – c. 1649) was a founding settler of Providence in what would become the Colony of Rhode Island and Providence Plantations. Smith joined Roger Williams at the Seekonk River in 1636 after both were expelled from Massachusetts Bay Colony. In the spring they crossed the river to found Providence where Smith later built and operated the town's gristmill.

The state capitol building in Providence is located on "Smith Hill"—a place name that memorializes John Smith and is a metonym for the Rhode Island state government.

== Life ==
=== Dorchester ===
John Smith (Note: There were several unrelated Smiths in Providence Plantations including John Smith (President of Rhode Island) who served on the General Court in 1647 representing Providence and later Warwick.) was born in England and migrated to Dorchester, Massachusetts Bay Colony in the early 1630s. His family included his wife, Alice, and two children, Elizabeth and John Jr. (Note: Some sources give the birthyear for John Smith's son, John Smith Jr., as 1641. But John Jr. was likely born in the 1620s or early 1630s, before the family moved to Providence, since he took over the mill by 1649 and was an ensign in the militia by 1654.) Smith was a miller in Dorchester in 1635 and probably worked at the colony's only grist mill. The Dorchester mill was built on the Neponset River in 1634 and operated by Israel Stoughton. Stoughton was barred from holding public office in 1634 after he wrote a book, which was burned, that criticized (Note: Stoughton argued that the assistants exercised illegitimate veto power over decisions made by deputies in the General Court.) the General Court.

In September 1635, John Smith was banished from Massachusetts Bay Colony by the General Court: "Ordered, that John Smyth shall be sent within these six weeks out of this jurisdiction, for divers dangerous opinions which he holdeth and hath divulged, if in the meantime he removes not himself out of this plantation." Both John Smith and his wife called the magistrates "devils." A month later, in the same court, Roger Williams—a Salem preacher who advocated for church-state separation and Native American land rights—would be banished for "newe & dangerous opinions."

In the winter of 1635/36, Smith and others — William Harris, Francis Wickes (a minor possibly working at Stoughton's mill), and Thomas Angell — joined Roger Williams on the east side of the Seekonk River before establishing Providence. Williams wrote the following account of the gathering: "...out of pity I gave leave to William Harris to come along. I also consented to John Smith, miller of Dorchester (banished also) to go with us, and at John Smith's desire to a young fellow named Frances Wickes, as also to a lad of Richard Waterman's."

=== Providence ===
==== Smith's mill and property ====
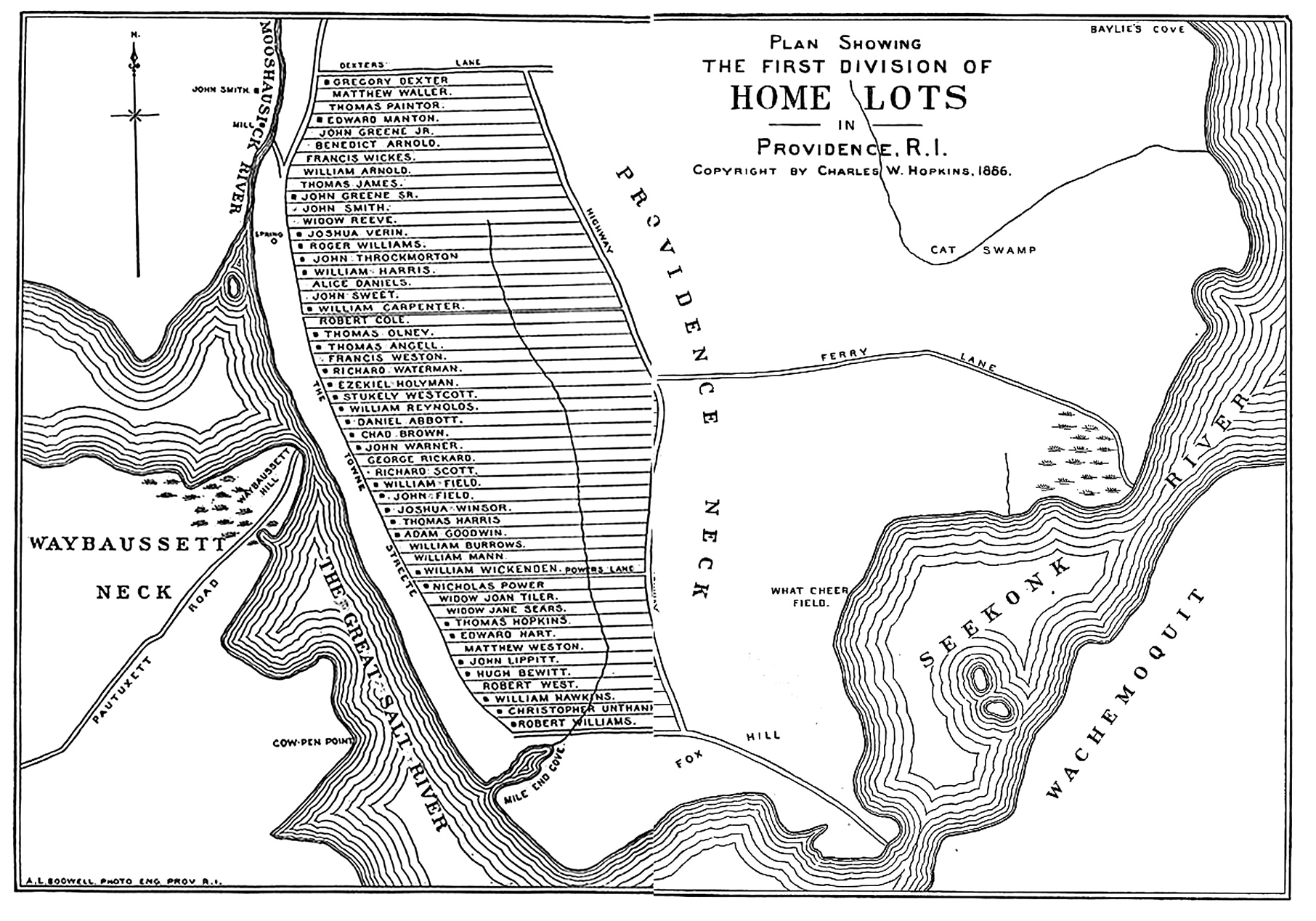
Town layout of Providence with Smith's original lot eleventh from the top. His mill and home are shown in the upper left.

In 1636, Smith was granted a narrow home lot on Towne Street where he built his first house. The west end of his lot began at the intersection of present-day Smith and North Main Streets (near the Episcopal Diocese of Rhode Island offices) and continued eastward to present-day Hope Street.

In January 1646, John Smith received 25 acres of land, but the grant excluded voting rights. He signed the agreement with his mark, which indicates he was not able to read or write. That year Smith built a house along the Moshassuck River and at a monthly town meeting it was “agreed that John Smith shall have the valley where his house stands, in case he sets up a mill, as also excepting sufficient highways." Smith erected the town's gristmill on the Moshassuck River near the intersection of present-day Mill and Charles Streets. According to historian Norman Isham, the mill ground the town's flour two days a week and on other days it was "a place for informal gatherings by the townspeople and for occasional town meetings and religious services."

In 1647, according to town records, Smith was granted more than 20 acres of land on either side of the Moshassuck River. (Note: Town records: "...ten acres more or less at or about the place where the mill now standeth, six acres more or less of meadow lying at the upper end of that which is called the great meadow on the southwestward side of the river called Moshassuck, six acres of meadow at the place commonly called the Wainscote meadow lying and being part of it on the south side and part of it on the north side of the River...") When John Smith died in about 1649 he owned at least 150 acres. According to the 1650 property tax list, his widow, Alice, was one of the wealthiest residents in Providence. The town made an agreement with Alice Smith and her son, John Jr., that they could continue to operate the town's mill if they maintained it. John Jr. continued to run the mill even though, consistent with the family's tradition of dissent, the Smiths refused to sign the agreement.

In 1676, during King Philip's War, most of the homes and the mill in Providence were burned to the ground. John Jr., the miller and the town clerk, ran from the garrison to his burning home ("The corne mill with ye house over it") and saved most of the town's records by dousing them in the mill pond.

==== Non-franchisement and disaffection ====
It is ironic that the phrase "Smith Hill" is today metonymous with "Rhode Island government" because John Smith was not allowed to—or chose not to—participate in government. Although Smith was among the very first settlers in Providence, he did not sign the Providence civil compact of 1637, was not listed by Williams among the 12 original proprietors in 1638, was not among the founding members of the First Baptist Church, and did not sign the Providence Combination of 1640. Historian Howard Chapin wrote that it is "significant" that Smith's servant, Francis Wickes, was enfranchised (given voting rights), but Smith was not. (Note: Howard Chapin: "This second omission of Smith and Reynolds is significant. Reynolds later signed the so-called 'Compact' together with Wickes, Angell, Benedict Arnold, Cope and others. I have found no record showing that Smith was ever enfranchised.")

Williams wrote to John Winthrop in 1638 that he disliked the Smiths, especially Alice, after their forceful dissent in Boston:

...it is and ever shall be (the Lord assisting) my endeavor to pacify and allay, where I meet with rigid and censorious spirits, who not only blame your actions but doom your persons: and indeed it was one of the first grounds of my dislike of John Smith, the miller and especially of his wife, viz: their judging of your persons [Winthrop and the magistrates] as devils etc."

The long-standing animosity that Williams and other Providence residents had toward Smith continued after his death. So In 1651, after Smith's death, Williams wrote to the town asking that they end their grudge against him, in part, to prevent Smith from crawling from his grave to haunt the town:

First, then, I pray be pleased to review the propositions between us and our dead friend, John Smith; and since it hath pleased the God of all mercies, to vouchsafe this town and others such a mercy, by his means, I beseech you study how to put an end to that controversy depending between us and him, (as I may so speak) and his; 'tis true, you have referred that business to some of our loving neighbors amongst you; but since there are some obstruction, I beseech you put forth your wisdoms, who know more ways to the wood than one. Ease the first, and appoint others, or some other course, than the dead clamor not from his grave against us, but that the country about us may say, that Providence is not only a wise, but a grateful people to the God of mercies, and all his instruments of mercy towards us.

== Legacy ==
=== Tributes ===
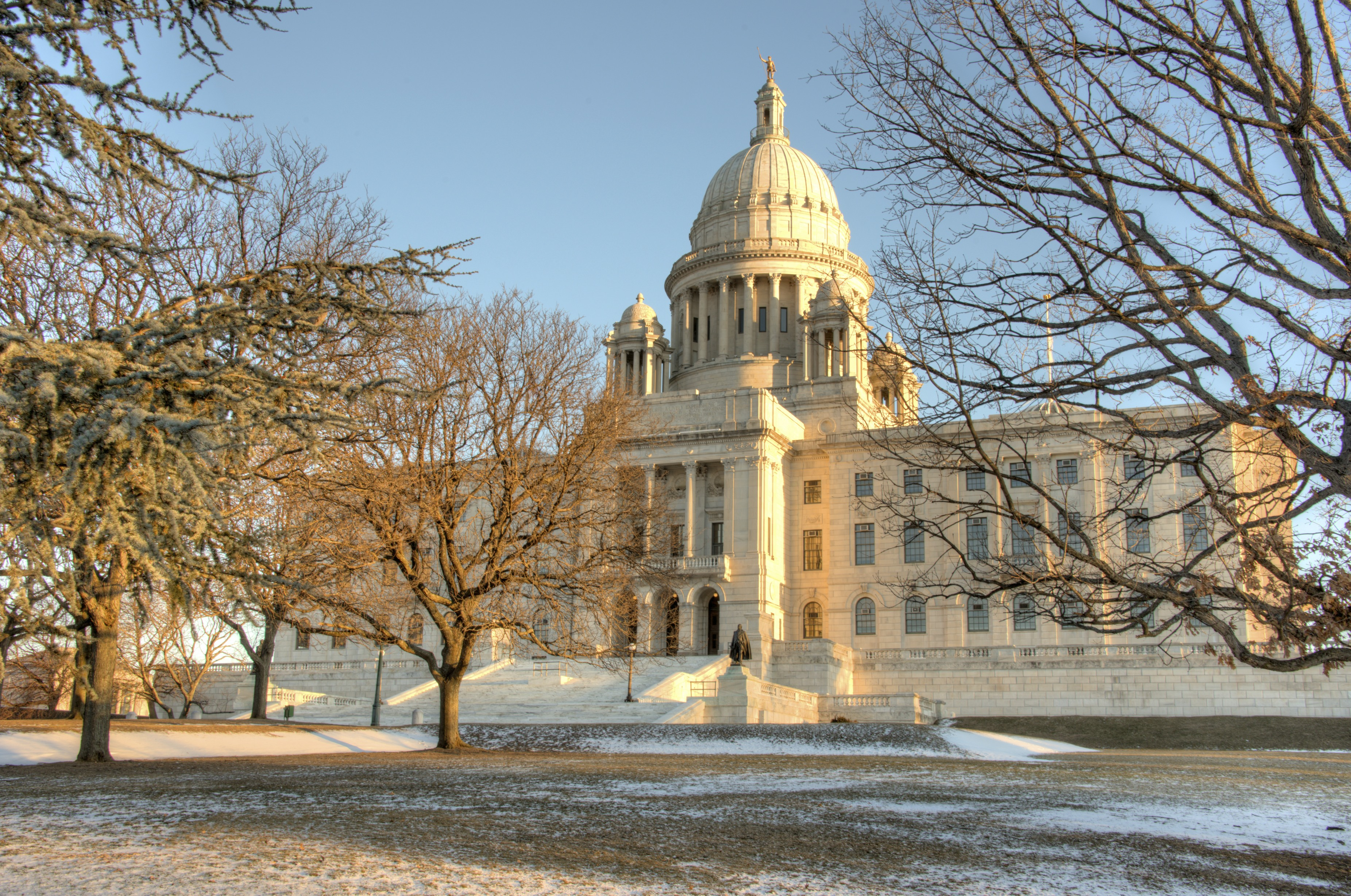
Rhode Island State House

The current Rhode Island State House — the state capitol building — is on land named for, and formerly owned by, John Smith. Constructed between 1891 and 1904, it is located on present-day Smith Hill in the Smith Hill Neighborhood on Smith Street.

The Town of Smithfield, a small town in northern Rhode Island, was named after John Smith according to the town's official website. There is an alternate oral tradition that Smithfield was named for Roger Williams's hometown of Smithfield, England.

=== Depictions ===
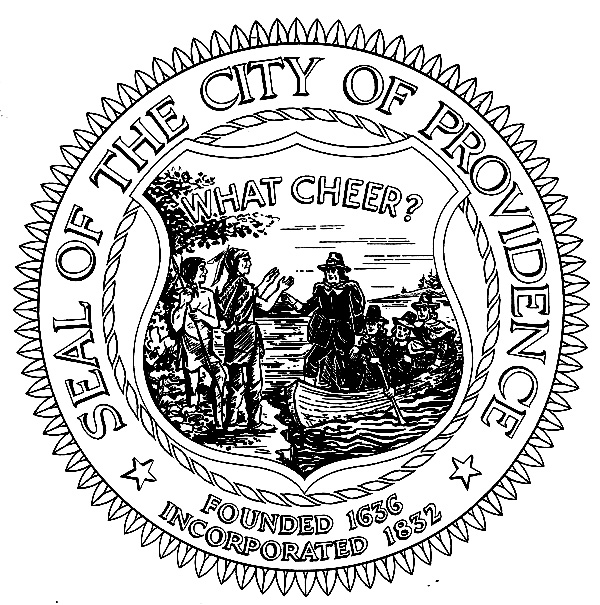
Seal of the City of Providence

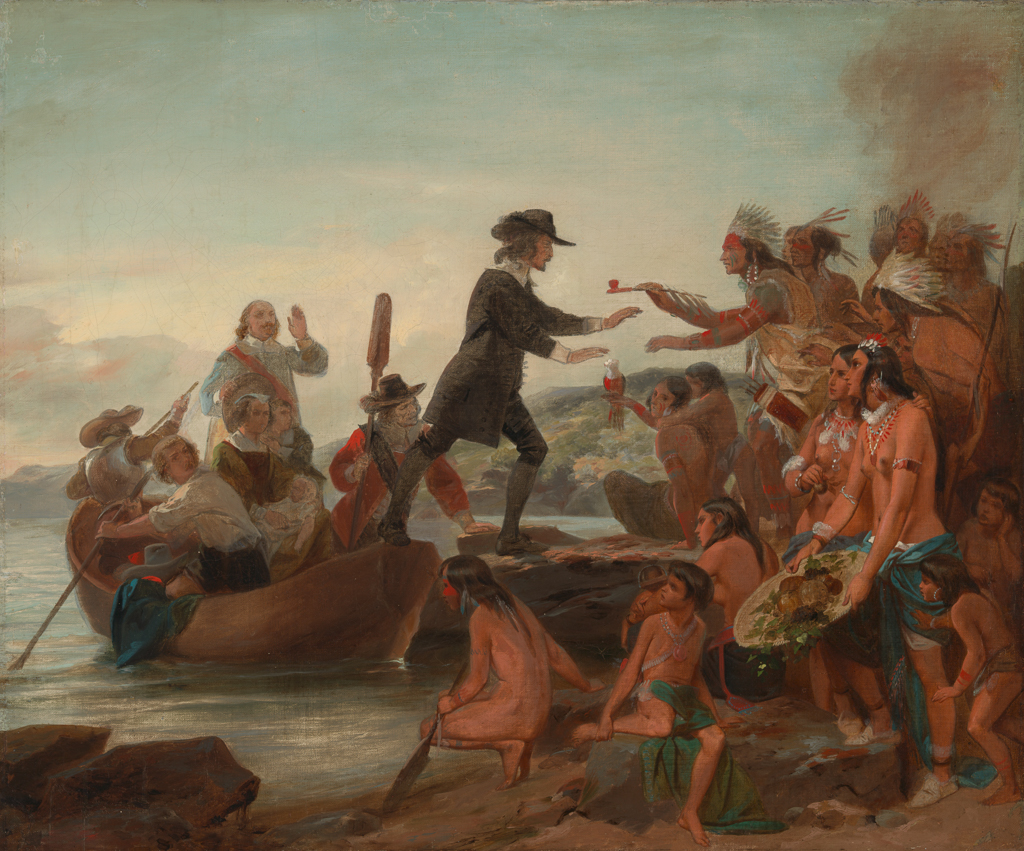
Alonzo Chappel - The Landing of Roger Williams in 1636

The current Seal of the City of Providence depicts four men in a canoe representing Roger Williams and the first settlers, including John Smith, being greeted by two Native Americans.

The famous painting, The Landing of Roger Williams in 1636 by Alonzo Chappel depicts Roger Williams, five men, two women, and a child in a canoe; presumably one of the men is Smith.

=== Historic homes of descendants ===
The Joseph Smith House at 109 Smithfield Road, North Providence, was built in 1705 by Joseph Smith, grandson of John Smith. It is the only surviving "stone-ender" in the town of North Providence.

The Smith–Appleby House at 220 Stillwater Road, Smithfield, was originally built in saltbox form in 1713 by Elisha Smith, a grandson of John Smith. It is now an historic house museum.

The mansion of Smith's great-great grandson, Henry Smith, the fifth governor of Rhode Island, was demolished in 1920 to build the capitol annex across Smith Street from the State House.
