= Thomas Hopkins (settler) =

Early Providence settler

- Born: baptized 7 April 1616; Yeovilton, Somerset, England
- Died: 1684; Oyster Bay, New York
- Education: signed name with a mark
- Occupations: Commissioner, Deputy
- Children: William, Thomas, Joseph who married Elizabeth and had two children
- Parents: William Hopkins (father); Joane Arnold (mother)
- Relatives: Nephew of William Arnold; First cousin of Governor Benedict Arnold; Great grandfather of Governor Stephen Hopkins and Commodore Esek Hopkins

Thomas Hopkins (1616–1684) was an early settler of Providence Plantations in colonial Rhode Island. He was the great-grandfather of brothers Esek Hopkins, the only Commander in Chief of the Continental Navy during the American Revolutionary War, and Stephen Hopkins, who served multiple terms as colonial governor of Rhode Island and signed the Declaration of Independence.

== Early life and migration ==
Hopkins was baptized in Yeovilton, Somerset, England, on 7 April 1616, the son of William Hopkins and Joane (Arnold) Hopkins. His mother, Joane Arnold, was the sister of early Providence settler William Arnold and the daughter of Nicholas and Alice (Gully) Arnold of Northover and Ilchester in Somerset. Hopkins’ mother died when he was five years old, after which he and his sister Frances were likely taken into the household of their uncle William Arnold. Most sources agree that Hopkins emigrated to New England in 1635, at age nineteen, with his uncle’s family. Aboard the same ship was his cousin Benedict Arnold, also aged nineteen, who would later become governor of the Rhode Island colony.

== Life in America ==
The Arnold family initially settled in Hingham in the Massachusetts Bay Colony but remained there for less than a year. In April 1636, they joined Roger Williams and became among the first settlers of Providence Plantations. Soon afterward, they established themselves along the Pawtuxet River, on the southern boundary of Williams’s Providence purchase. Hopkins was not yet of legal age when the settlement began, but upon reaching his majority, he became one of the 39 signers of the Providence Combination of 1640, an agreement to establish a local government, marking his signature with a simple mark.

Between 1652 and 1672, Hopkins served in several civic capacities in Providence, including Commissioner, Deputy, and member of the Town Council. During King Philip's War (1675–1676), most of Providence and all of the Pawtuxet settlement were destroyed. Hopkins’s eldest sons, William and Thomas, either remained in Providence or returned there shortly after the conflict. Following the death of his youngest son, Joseph, Hopkins moved with his daughter-in-law Elizabeth and her two children, Ichabod and Anna, to Oyster Bay on Long Island in the Province of New York, where they settled permanently. Elizabeth later married Richard Kirby, in whose home Hopkins was living when he died in 1684.

== See also ==
- List of early settlers of Rhode Island
- Colony of Rhode Island and Providence Plantations

== Images ==
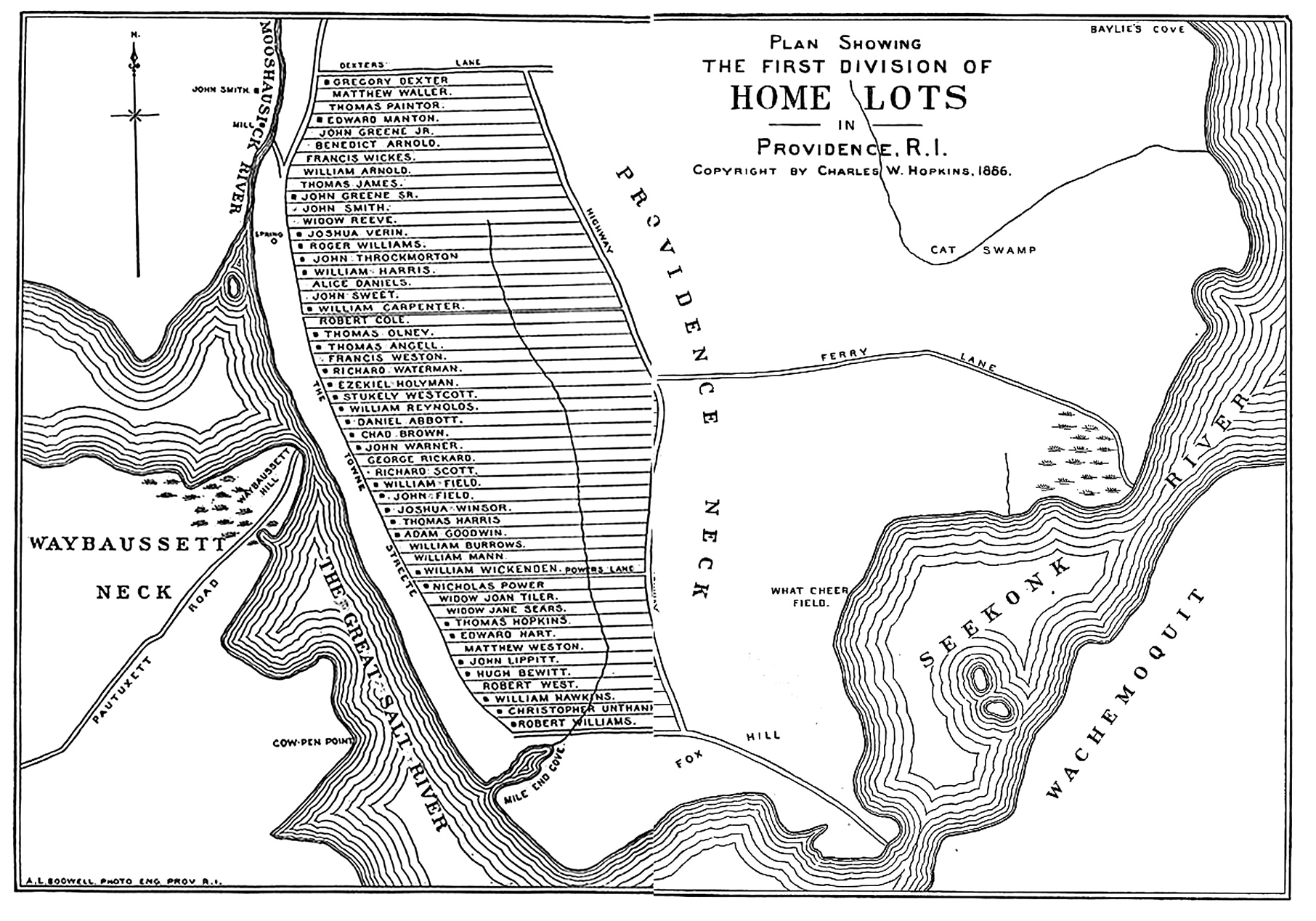
Town layout of Providence with Hopkins' lot ninth from bottom

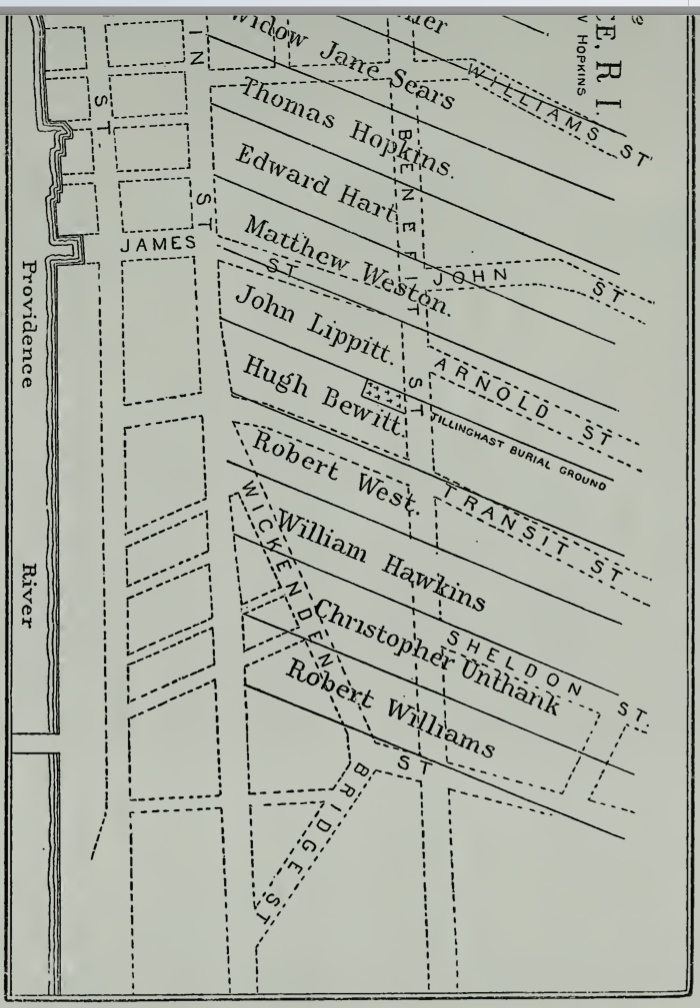
Detail showing Hopkins' lot overlaid on contemporary map
