= James Barker (Rhode Island official) =

English ensign & leader (1622–1702)

10th Deputy Governor of the Colony of Rhode Island and Providence Plantations
- In office November 8, 1678 – May 7, 1679
- Governor: Benedict Arnold; William Coddington; John Cranston
- Preceded by: John Cranston
- Succeeded by: Walter Clarke

Personal details
- Born: c. October 1622 Southwold, Suffolk, England
- Died: c. 1702 (aged 79–80) Newport, Rhode Island, English America
- Spouse: Barbara Dungan
- Occupation: Ensign; commissioner; assistant

James Barker (c. October 1622 – c. 1702) was an English-born ensign, commissioner, and assistant early leader who served as the tenth deputy governor of the Colony of Rhode Island and Providence Plantations from 1678 to 1679.

== Life ==
James Barker was baptized on 20 October 1622 at Southwold, Suffolk, England, the son of James Barker. It is possible that his father was the James Barker of Southwold whose estate was administered on 5 Feb 1626/7, leaving estate to widow Elizabeth. It is also plausible that Barker lost his mother shortly thereafter, and as an orphan was then cared for by his aunt, Christian (Barker) (Cooper) Beecher. There had been a family tradition that young James Barker sailed to New England in 1634 with his father, who died en route, and with his aunt Christian who was married to Nicholas Easton. While there are possibly elements of truth in this tradition, there are also two serious flaws. The first is that it appears that James's father died several years before young James sailed to New England, based on the 1626 administration mentioned. Secondly, Christian was married to Thomas Beecher when she came to New England, in 1630. Beecher died in early 1637, so his widow did not marry Nicholas Easton until after then. It is most likely that young James Barker came to New England as an orphan with his aunt in 1630, but no documentation has been found to support this. It is almost certain, however, that Barker came to Rhode Island from Massachusetts with his aunt and her third husband, Nicholas Easton, about 1638.

Once reaching adulthood, Barker became active in the civil affairs of the colony, undertaking positions as commissioner, assistant, and deputy over a period of many years. In the Rhode Island Royal Charter adopted in 1663, which became the basis for Rhode Island's government for nearly two centuries, Barker was named as one of the ten Assistants (magistrates) of the colony. In 1676, during King Philip's War, it was voted that the advice of the most judicious inhabitants of the colony be obtained, and that these people sit at the next session of the assembly. Barker was one of the 16 men whose counsel was sought in this request. In 1678 he was elected as Deputy Governor, serving under governors Benedict Arnold, William Coddington, and John Cranston, the first two both dying in office in 1678. He was a Baptist minister, assisting in the ordination of Rev. Richard Dingley in 1690. His wife was Barbara Dungan, the oldest daughter of Frances Dungan and her husband William.

== Family ==
Coat of Arms of James Barker

The English background of James Barker has been discovered largely through his connection with his Aunt Christian Barker, sister of his father James. Christian and the elder James were children of an earlier James Barker and his wife, Christian King. The first James Barker was a son of William Barker, who was a son of Robert Barker. Christian Barker was married three times, first, in 1610, to Thomas Cooper, second, in 1626, to Thomas Beecher, and third, about 1637, to Nicholas Easton, who later became governor of the Rhode Island colony. This is why James Barker was called a nephew of Nicholas Easton in a 1663 deed. Christian first came to New England in 1630 with her second husband who was a mariner, and became member #17 of the Boston church in late summer of that year. It is plausible that Barker, her nephew, was orphaned at the time, and came with her.

James and Barbara Barker had eight known children, all born in Newport, Rhode Island from about 1645 to 1662.

=== Ancestry ===
The ancestry of James Barker was published by Jane Flether Fiske and William Wyman Fiske in the New England Historic Genealogical Register in 2015 and 2016.

Ancestors of James Barker (Rhode Island official)

16. Robert Barker (say 1475 - 1525/6)
8. William Barker (say 1500 - 1558)
17. ? Agnes Smith
4. James Barker (say 1546 - 1621)
18. William Barrett
9. Audrey Barrett (c. 1514 - c. 1590)
19. Margaret Love
2. James Barker (1587-1626?)
10. Raymond King (died 1600)
5. Christian King (died 1617)
1. James Barker (1622-1702)
3. Elizabeth (?)

One of many Barker Lines (continuing today): (1) Robert Barker d. bef. 29 Jan 1525 (2) William Barker d. bef. 20 Jun 1558 (3) James Barker b. 1555, Harwich, Essex, England (4) James Barker b. 1587, Harwich, Essex, England; d. 1634, Aboard Ship Mary & John enroute to MA(?) (5) James Barker b. 1623, Harwich, Essex, England; d. 1702 (6) James Barker b. btw. 1647 and 1648, Newport, RI; d. 1 Dec 1722 (7) James Barker b. 4 Dec 1675, Newport, RI; d. 26 Mar 1758 (8) John Barker b. 18 Dec 1710, Middletown, RI; d. 17 Mar 1777 (9) Elisha Barker b. 27 Dec 1744, Newport, RI; d. 10 May 1827 (10) Arnold Barker b. 7 Apr 1777, Middletown, RI; d. 14 Oct 1859 (11) Alanson L. Barker b. 27 Sep 1817, PA; d. 1875 (12) Joseph Cornell Barker b. 10 Oct 1858, Mt. Zion, IA; d. 17 Sep 1937 (13) Marvin Urias Barker b. 5 Jul 1885, Mt. Zion, IA; d., 2 Dec 1918 (14) Paul DeVere Barker b. 5 Jan 1908, Kansas; d. 13 Feb 1974.

== See also ==
- List of lieutenant governors of Rhode Island
- Colony of Rhode Island and Providence Plantations

== Bibliography ==
- Anderson, Robert Charles (1995). The Great Migration Begins, Immigrants to New England 1620–1633. Vol. I (A-F). Boston: New England Historic Genealogical Society. ISBN 0-88082-044-6.
- Austin, John Osborne (1887). Genealogical Dictionary of Rhode Island. Albany, New York: J. Munsell's Sons. ISBN 978-0-8063-0006-1.
- Fiske, Jane Fletcher; Fiske, William Wyman (Summer 2015). "The Rhode Island Barker Family: Suffolk Background and Connections to Other New England Immigrants". New England Historical and Genealogical Register. 169: 205–215. ISBN 978-0-7884-0293-7.
- Fiske, Jane Fletcher; Fiske, William Wyman (Winter 2016). "The Rhode Island Barker Family: Suffolk Background and Connections to Other New England Immigrants". New England Historical and Genealogical Register. 170: 66–78. ISBN 978-0-7884-0293-7.
