= John Whipple (settler) =

American settler (c. 1617–1685)

- Born: c. 1617
- Died: 16 May 1685; Providence, Rhode Island
- Resting place: North Burial Ground, Providence
- Education: He signed his name to deeds
- Occupations: Deputy, carpenter, tavernkeeper
- Spouse: Sarah
- Children: John, Sarah, Samuel, Eleazer, Mary, William, Benjamin, David, Abigail, Joseph, Jonathan

John Whipple (c. 1617–1685) was an early settler of Dorchester in the Massachusetts Bay Colony, who later settled in Providence in the Colony of Rhode Island and Providence Plantations, where the family became well established.

== Life ==
John Whipple arrived in New England on 3 November 1631 aboard "The Lyon," which also carried Roger Williams and John Eliot. The first mention of Whipple's name in colonial records was in October 1632 when he was ordered to pay a small fine for wasting powder and shot of his master, the Dorchester mill owner, Israel Stoughton, for whom Whipple worked as a carpenter. In 1637 Whipple received a grant of land in Dorchester near the Indian lands (his land was near modern-day Butler Street near the current Dorchester-Milton Lower Mills Industrial District bordering Phillips Creeke and the Neponset River). At some point in the late 1630s Whipple married a woman named Sarah (of unknown origin), and no record of their marriage is known to exist, and Sarah's gravestone states that she was born in Dorchester, Massachusetts in 1624 (despite this pre-dating the founding of the town). In 1641 Sarah Whipple joined the First Parish Church of Dorchester (John Whipple presumably joined earlier), and in 1650 Sarah joined a petition by the women of Dorchester to allow Alice Tilly to work as a midwife. For at least 17 years in Dorchester, the Whipples raised a large family in Dorchester, where eight of his 11 children were baptized. In a deed recorded in 1658 John was reported as living adjacent to Stoughton's mill in 1655 in a house owned by Israel Stoughton's heirs. In 1658 he sold his homestead and lands in Dorchester to George Minot and moved with his family to Providence, where he was received as a purchaser on 27 July 1659. By January 1660 Whipple was granted land in the Louisquisset area to acquire title from the Indians there.

In February 1665 he was given a lot in a division of lands, and the following year took an oath of allegiance in Providence. In 1666 he served as a deputy to the General Assembly, a position he held for seven of the next 11 years. In 1669 and again in 1670 he was paid for allowing the Providence Town Council to meet at his house, probably referring to his tavern for which he was later granted a license in 1674. He held a number of positions in Providence, including treasurer in 1668, surveyor in 1670 and 1671, selectman in 1670 and 1674, and moderator in 1676.

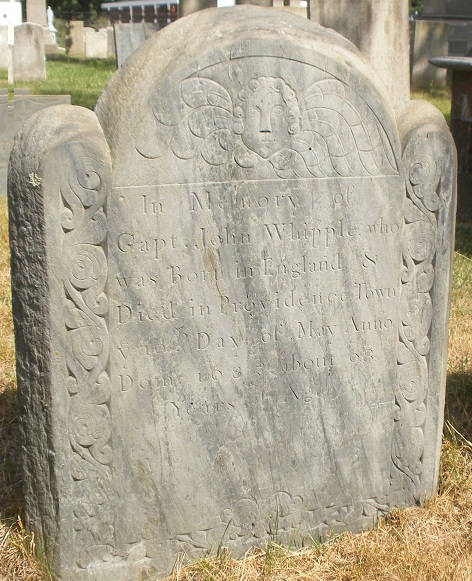
Grave stone for John Whipple, North Burial Ground, Providence

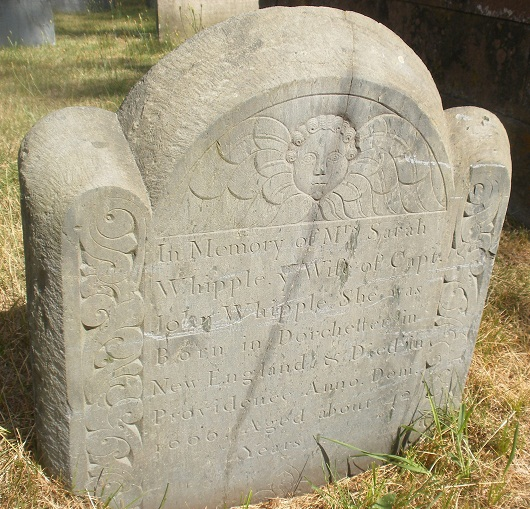
Grave stone for Sarah Whipple, wife of John

The year 1675 brought the most devastating event to afflict Rhode Island for the entire colonial period when King Phillips War erupted, bringing the bulk of its destructive force on the Rhode Island colony. All of Warwick and Pawtuxet were destroyed, and much of Providence was as well. As the war wound down in 1676, Indian captives were given as slaves to those residents who remained during the war, and on 14 August 1676 Whipple was so entreated as being one of those "who staid and went not away."

Whipple wrote his will on 8 May 1682, and it was proved three years later on 27 May 1685. His wife had died in 1666, aged about 42, and he and his wife were buried on their own land, but were later moved to the North Burial Ground after its opening in 1700.

== Family ==
With his wife Sarah, Whipple had 11 children, the first eight born in Dorchester, and the remainder born in Providence. His oldest son, John, married first Mary Olney, the daughter of Thomas Olney and Mary Small, and secondly Rebecca Scott, the widow of John Scott (son of Richard Scott and Catharine Marbury). Sarah married John Smith, Samuel married Mary Harris, and Eleazer married Alice Angell, the daughter of Thomas and Alice Angell. Mary married Epentus Olney, the son of Thomas Olney and his first wife Mary or Maria Ashton Epentus mother is incorrectly shown as Mary Small, Thomas Olney's second wife in Austin's The Genealogical Dictionary of Rhode Island. William's wife was named Mary, and Benjamin married Ruth Mathewson. David married first Sarah Hearndon, and secondly Hannah Tower, and Abigail married first Stephen Dexter, the son of colonial President Gregory Dexter, and secondly William Hopkins, the son of Thomas Hopkins. Whipple's tenth child, prominent merchant Joseph Whipple, married Alice Smith, and his youngest child, Jonathan, married first Margaret Angell, the daughter of Thomas Angell, and secondly a woman named Anne.

A grandson of Whipple, Joseph Whipple Jr. became deputy governor of the colony, and a great-grandson, Joseph Whipple, III, was also a deputy governor. Another great-grandson, Stephen Hopkins was a governor of the colony, Chief Justice of the Rhode Island Supreme Court, and signer of the Declaration of Independence.

== See also ==
- List of lieutenant governors of Rhode Island
- Colony of Rhode Island and Providence Plantations
