= William Mann (settler) =

Providence founding settler

- Born: c. 1610; England
- Died: 1650
- Known for: A first settler of Providence, Rhode Island, in 1636
- Spouse: Frances Hopkins
- Children: 2

Signature
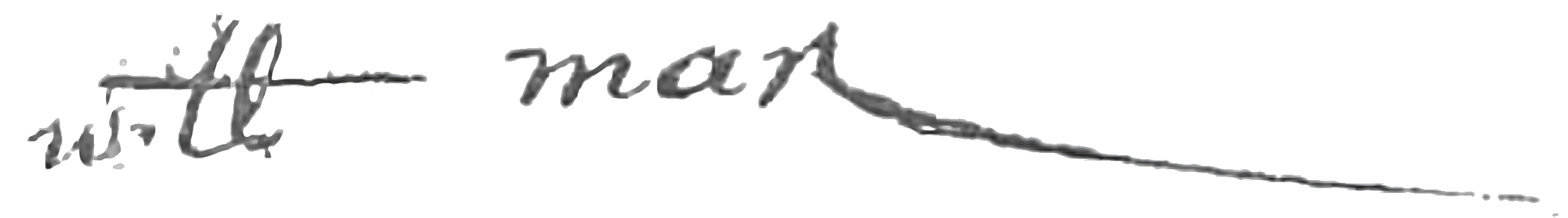

William Mann (c. 1610 – 1650), alternatively spelled Man, along with his wife Frances (née Hopkins) Mann, was among the original settlers in 1636 who founded Providence in the future Colony of Rhode Island and Providence Plantations.

== Life ==
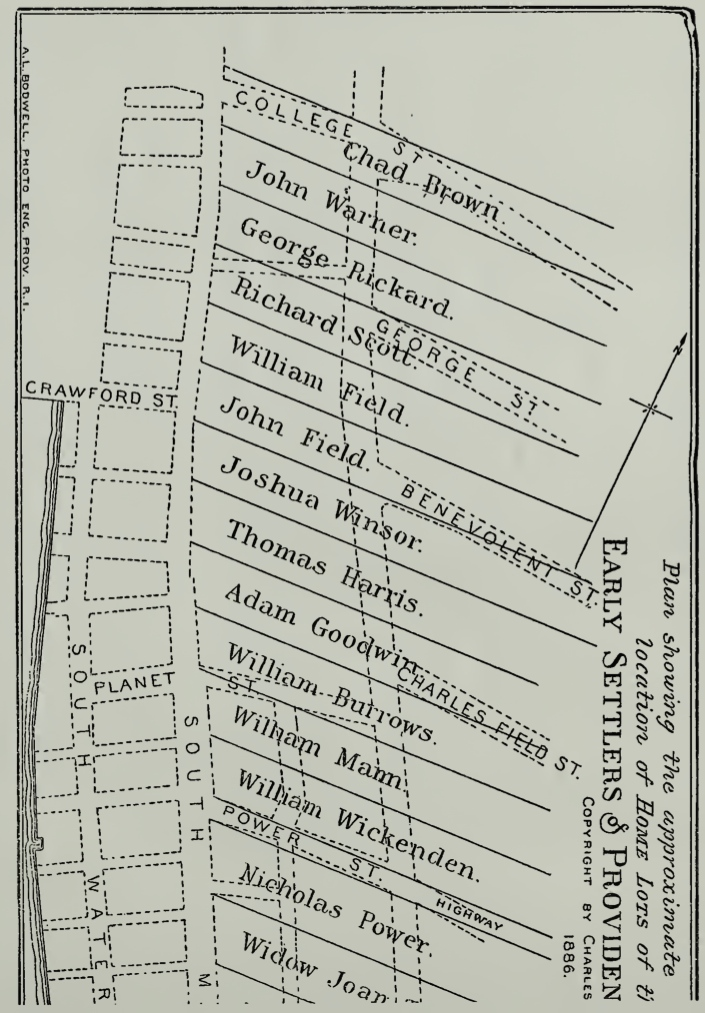
Map showing Mann's home lot

William and Frances Mann came to New England from Somerset County, England and became founding settlers of Providence with Roger Williams in 1636. William Mann received a six-acre Towne Street home lot on what is now South Main Street, situated at the intersection of today's Planet Street and extending to Hope Street. Between 1636 and 1645, he acquired more than 100 acres of meadow land in present-day Cranston and Providence.

William Mann signed the 1640 Providence Agreement which established the first secular, representative government in America. In 1641, he and twelve others signed a letter asking Massachusetts Bay Colony to intervene after the followers of Samuel Gorton caused a riot.

William and Frances had two children, both born in Providence. Their son Abraham was born about 1638 and their daughter Mary was born about 1640. William Mann died in 1650 at about the age of 40. Soon after his death his widow appeared before the town council, with Roger Williams presiding, and charged the council with negligence in overseeing her husband's will. In a letter, Roger Williams instructed the town to help organize William Mann's estate for the benefit of his widow and children:

Let me crave your patience, while once more I lead your consideration to the grave, amongst the dead, the widows and the fatherless. From some neighbors and the widow Mann herself, I understand, that notwithstanding her motherly affection, which will make all burthens lighter for her children's good, yet she is not without fears, that if the town be not favorable to her in after times, some hard measure and pressures may befall her. My request is, therefore, that it would please you to appoint some of yourselves to review the will, and to consider whether the pains of the father, deceased, or want of time, hath not occasioned him to leave some of his purposes and desires imperfect, as also to propose to the town wherein, according to the rules of justice and mercy, what the deceased intended, may be perfected, for the greater comfort both of his widow and orphans.

His widow, Frances, bought more land in 1657 and two years later she sold 64 acres of land near Mashapaug Pond to William Carpenter while keeping other meadow land. In 1660, the town looked into why she failed to pay the tax to support the infirmed William Borrows.

The home on Towne Street in Providence was destroyed in 1676 during King Philip's War. After the war, Frances Mann joined her daughter, Mary, and son-in-law, John Lapham, in Dartmouth, Massachusetts. Frances died in 1700 but the original Towne Street home lot remained in the family until 1706.
