= John Cranston (governor) =

Rhode Island colonial governor (1625–1680)

9th Governor of the Colony of Rhode Island and Providence Plantations
- In office 8 November 1678 – 12 March 1680
- Preceded by: William Coddington
- Succeeded by: Peleg Sanford

6th and 9th Deputy Governor of the Colony of Rhode Island and Providence Plantations
- In office May 1672 – May 1673
- Governor: Nicholas Easton
- Preceded by: Dr. John Clarke
- Succeeded by: William Coddington
- In office May 1676 – 8 November 1678
- Governor: Walter Clarke; Benedict Arnold; William Coddington
- Preceded by: John Easton
- Succeeded by: James Barker

2nd Attorney General of Rhode Island
- In office May 1654 – May 1656
- Governor: Nicholas Easton; Roger Williams
- Preceded by: William Dyer (before Coddington Commission)
- Succeeded by: John Easton

Personal details
- Born: 1625
- Died: 12 March 1680 (aged 54–55) Newport, Rhode Island
- Resting place: Common Burying Ground, Newport
- Spouse: Mary Clarke
- Occupation: Physician, surgeon, deputy, assistant, major-general, deputy governor, governor

John Cranston (1625–1680) was a colonial physician, military leader, legislator, deputy governor and governor of the Colony of Rhode Island and Providence Plantations during the 17th century.

== Biographical summary ==
Cranston was sent to New England as a boy; he was put under the care of Jeremiah Clarke, who became an early president of the colony, and he eventually married Clarke's daughter, Mary.

Elected a drummer in the militia of Portsmouth while a teenager, Cranston had several military positions of authority throughout his life, and during King Philip's War he commanded the colony's militia. He also became the colony's first licensed physician and surgeon in March 1663.

Later in life, Cranston was elected to a variety of offices, including attorney general, deputy, assistant and commissioner. In 1672 he was elected for the first time to the office of deputy governor, for a year, and then in 1676 during King Philip's War was elected again to that office. In 1678, following the deaths of two colonial governors in rapid succession, Cranston was elected to the office of governor, which position he held for nearly two years until his own death in March 1680.

== Family background ==
Coat of Arms of John Cranston

Born in Scotland or England, John Cranston was the son of Rev. James Cranston, the rector of St. Mary Overie Church in Southwark, London, later known as St. Saviour's Church, and now called Southwark Cathedral. Reverend Cranston was also one of the chaplains of King Charles I. The details of how Cranston came to New England were provided by his son, Governor Samuel Cranston, who wrote in a 26 December 1724 letter to his cousin Elizabeth Cranston in Edinburgh, Scotland, "My father being a sprightly youth of a roving fancy, my Grandfather Recommended him to the care and tuition of one Capt. Jeremiah Clarke, Merchant and Cittysen of London, with whome he came into this country and Setled on this Island." Jeremy Clarke came to New England in 1637 and in 1638 became an inhabitant of Aquidneck Island, later called Rhode Island. Rev. James Cranston was the son of John Cranston of Bold, or Bool, Peebles County, Scotland, and the family descends from one Andrew de Cranston who died before 1338.

== Early career ==
Cranston first appears on the public record in March 1644 when he was elected to be a drummer in the military company of Portsmouth in the Rhode Island colony. Ten years later he was on the mainland, and was the attorney general for Providence and Warwick, when these two towns were separated from the island towns of Portsmouth and Newport. In 1654 the four towns re-united under one government, and he was then attorney general for the entire colony from that year until 1656. In 1655 he was made a freeman and during the same year he was on one committee to build a prison, and on another committee to prevent the sale of ammunition to the Indians. During most years from 1655 to 1663 he was a Commissioner from Newport, and in 1658 he married Mary, the daughter of Jeremy Clarke who had brought him to New England.

== Physician, legislator and military commander ==
Cranston became proficient as a medical practitioner during his early life, and was recognized for his skills by the General Assembly. On 1 March 1664, the Assembly wrote, "Whereas the court have taken notice of the great blessing of God on the good endeavours of Captain John Cranston, of Newport, both in physic and chirurgery [surgery], to the great comfort of such as have had occasion to improve his skill and practice." It was therefore unanimously enacted in March 1663/4 that he should be licensed "to administer physic, and practice chirurgery throughout this whole colony, and is by the court styled and recorded Doctor of Physic and Chirurgery."

Cranston was deputy to the General Assembly each year from 1664 to 1668, was a governor's assistant from 1668 to 1672, and then in 1672 was elected as deputy governor of the colony for a year. During all of this time he remained active in the military affairs of the colony. In July 1667 he was commissioned as the captain in command of the "Train Band upon the Island" (i.e. Aquidneck Island). That same year, he and two others were required with all possible speed to mount the great guns upon such carriages to allow for their easy conveyance from place to place. In 1671 he was allowed compensation for voyages he made to both New York and to Seekonk, likely for military matters. In May 1673 he was commissioned as the "Captain in Chief of the Colony Military Force". In May 1675 he was promoted to the rank of major and retained this position until May 1679 when he was succeeded by Major Peleg Sanford.

In 1675 the New England colonies became embroiled in a major war with members of several native tribes. King Philip's War, named for the Wampanoag chief, Metacomet, or King Philip, was the most devastating event to visit the Rhode Island colony prior to the American Revolutionary War. In April 1676 the General Assembly had provided for the naval defense of Aquidneck Island, adjourned for one week. They then elected Captain Cranston, with a promotion to the rank of major (not, as some sources state, major-general), to command all of the colony's militia companies. He simultaneously served as deputy governor for the following two years.

== Governor ==
Cranston had been deputy governor under his brother-in-law, Walter Clarke for the year beginning in May 1676, but the following year the "War Party" was put in power with Benedict Arnold elected as governor. In May 1678 Arnold was once again elected as governor of the colony, and Cranston again elected as deputy governor. In a few weeks, however, Arnold was dead, and William Coddington was elected as governor, with Cranston continuing as his deputy. The tax law was modified at this time, requiring the governor to give legal notice to every town before levying a tax. The population of the colony was deemed to be about 1000 to 1200 freemen able to bear arms. At the beginning of November 1678, Coddington had also died in office. On 4 November Conanicut Island was incorporated as a township and called Jamestown in honor of the Duke of York, who soon became king (as James II & VII.)

During a special session of the General Assembly held from 8 to 15 November, Cranston was elected governor of the colony, with James Barker elected as his deputy. The Charter and other papers were obtained from Mrs. Coddington and put into the custody of the new governor. Many of the agenda items during his administration dealt with financial issues, and several finance or taxation laws were passed or repealed. One of the first acts was to pass the first tax levy since the recent war. A rate of 300 pounds was assessed, broken down by town as follows: Newport, 136; Portsmouth, 68; New Shoreham (Block Island), 29; Jamestown, 29; Providence, 10; Warwick, 8; Kingston, 16 (reduced to 8); Greenwich, 2; and Westerly, 2. Never, in the history of the colony, had there been such a disproportionate share in taxation, and the numbers clearly show the relative degree to which the various towns had suffered as a result of the war.

In 1679 the Crown confirmed the jurisdiction of Rhode Island over the Narragansett country, within which were the recent settlements of Westerly, Kings Town, and Greenwich. A letter of thankful acknowledgment was sent to King Charles II, but also with a request that the area around Mount Hope be added to the colony. However, disputes with the Connecticut Colony had not ended, and in his final official act, Cranston sent a letter to the King dated 6 January 1679/80, concerning disputed lands in the Narragansett county still claimed by Connecticut.

== Death ==
Cranston died in office on 12 March 1680 and was succeeded as governor by Peleg Sanford, the son of a former governor of Newport and Portsmouth, John Sanford. He was buried in Newport's Common Burying Ground. His white marble gravestone (dating from the late 17th century) is still in place and is one of the oldest grave markers extant in the United States.

== Legacy ==
Rhode Island historian and Lieutenant Governor Samuel G. Arnold wrote of him, "Governor John Cranston had borne a distinguished part in the history of the Colony, and filled the highest military and civil positions in its gift. He was the first who ever held the place of major-general, having been selected to command all the militia of the Colony during Philip's War, and he was the father of a future governor, who became more distinguished for his protracted public service." (Note – Arnold's use of the term "major-general" means an officer with the rank of major having general authority and is not to be confused with the military rank of major general.)

== Family ==
Gary Boyd Roberts gives the paternal grandmother of Cranston as Christian Stewart, and through her shows a descent from King Robert III of Scotland. However, he also adds that another researcher, Andrew B. W. MacEwen, has doubts about Cranston's immediate ancestry.

Cranston's wife, Mary, was the daughter of former Rhode Island President Jeremy Clarke and his wife Frances, and sister of Rhode Island Governor Walter Clarke. The Clarkes are descendants of King Edward I of England, and therefore all of Cranston's descendants are royally descended through the Clarkes, if not through the Cranstons as well. Together, John and Mary Cranston had ten children, the oldest of whom, Samuel Cranston, became the longest-serving governor in the history of both the colony and the state of Rhode Island

Following Cranston's death, his widow married the widower Captain John Stanton, son of Robert and Avis Stanton of Newport, with whom she had one more child.

Several of his descendants, including his 4th great grandson John Cranston Manchester, and Manchester’s eldest son Andrew Howe Manchester, became members of the United States Senate and House of Representatives.

== See also ==
- List of colonial governors of Rhode Island
- List of lieutenant governors of Rhode Island
- Colony of Rhode Island and Providence Plantations
