= Thomas Olney =

English colonist in North America (c. 1610 – c. 1682)

- Born: c. 1600; St. Albans, England
- Died: c. 1682; Colony of Rhode Island and Providence Plantations
- Occupation: shoemaker
- Known for: early proprietor in Colony of Rhode Island and Providence Plantations

Thomas Olney (c. 1600 – c. 1682) was an early settler in the English Colony of Rhode Island and Providence Plantations, where he served as a minister at the First Baptist Church, Providence, and was one of the first proprietors in colony.

== Family ==
Olney was born in St. Albans, England, about 1600 and was trained as a shoemaker. He married Marie Ashton, the daughter of James and Alice Ashton, at St. Albans Abbey in Hertfordshire, England on September 16, 1629, and they had the following children: Thomas, Epenetus, Nabadiah, James, Mary, Discovered, and Lydia. His first 2 sons were baptized in St. Albans, England and the remainder were born in America. Austin's "The Genealogical Dictionary of Rhode Island" 1887, he refers to Thomas' wife as Mary Small. It is undetermined if he picked up an incorrect surname for his first wife, or if this was a second wife. No record for this marriage has been located at this point.

Olney's will was dated March 21, 1679/80 and proved October 17, 1682 in Providence, Rhode Island.

== Immigration to New England ==
Olney and his family immigrated to Massachusetts on the ship Planter, having received their permit to emigrate in April 1635. They arrived in Boston, Massachusetts on 7 June 1635 and first settled in Salem, Massachusetts.

They were asked to leave Massachusetts Bay Colony due to religious differences, and they moved to Providence in 1638 following Roger Williams. He signed the Providence agreement to form a government in 1640, and he was one of the original 12 persons to whom Roger Williams deeded land that he had purchased from Canonicus and Miantonomi on October 8, 1638. His wife Marie died between 1645 when her last child was born and 15 Aug 1659, when her husband Thomas refers to persons who might claim thirds in a piece of land he was selling.

== Political career ==
Olney served the town in various capacities including the first Treasurer, Court Assistant, Town Councilman, Clerk, Assistant to the General Court of Trials, Commissioner, Justice of the Peace, Town Moderator, Fence Viewer, juryman, tax collector and Commissioner to End Small Causes. He was on a sub-committee to prevent sale of ammunition to the Indians and numerous other committee's. He was named as one of the ten Assistants to the Governor in the Royal Charter of 1663, a document which served as the basis for Rhode Island's government for nearly two centuries.

== First Baptist Church ==
Olney was one of the original members of the First Baptist Church in Providence, but he and several others withdrew from the Six-Principle Baptists under William Wickenden's leadership to found a second church in 1653/4. He served as lay pastor for this small congregation until his death in Providence between June 16 and October 9, 1682.

== See also ==
- List of early settlers of Rhode Island
- Colony of Rhode Island and Providence Plantations
