= 1776 Rhode Island gubernatorial election =

- April 3, 1776
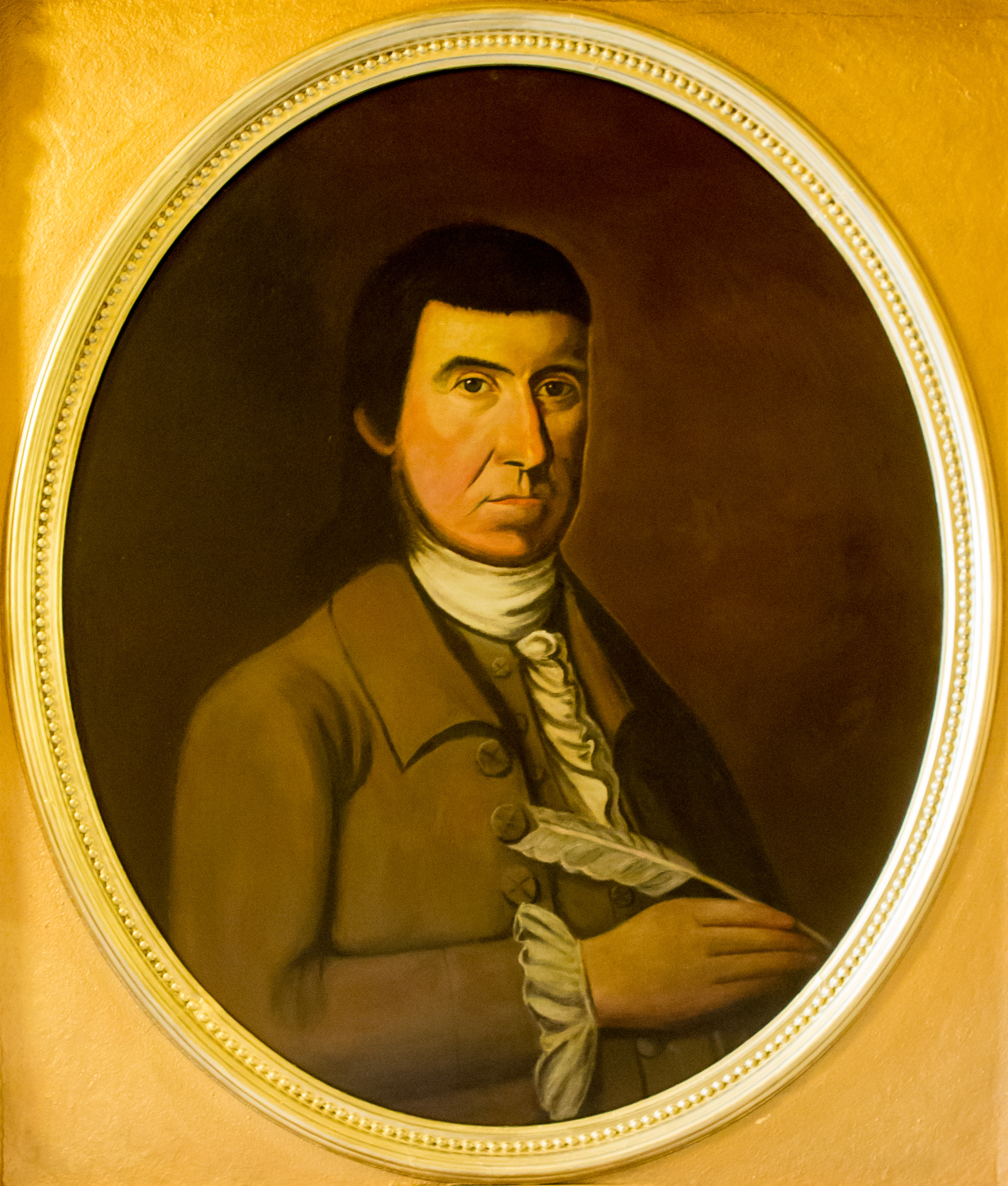
Nominee	Nicholas Cooke
Party	Independent
Percentage	100.00%

The 1776 Rhode Island gubernatorial election was the first election in the State after its secession from British colonies and joining the United States.

The election was organized for April 3, 1776, when Nicholas Cooke won unopposed with 100% of the vote.

Cooke had also governed the State when it was a Colony.
