= Nicholas Cooke =

American politician (1717 –1782

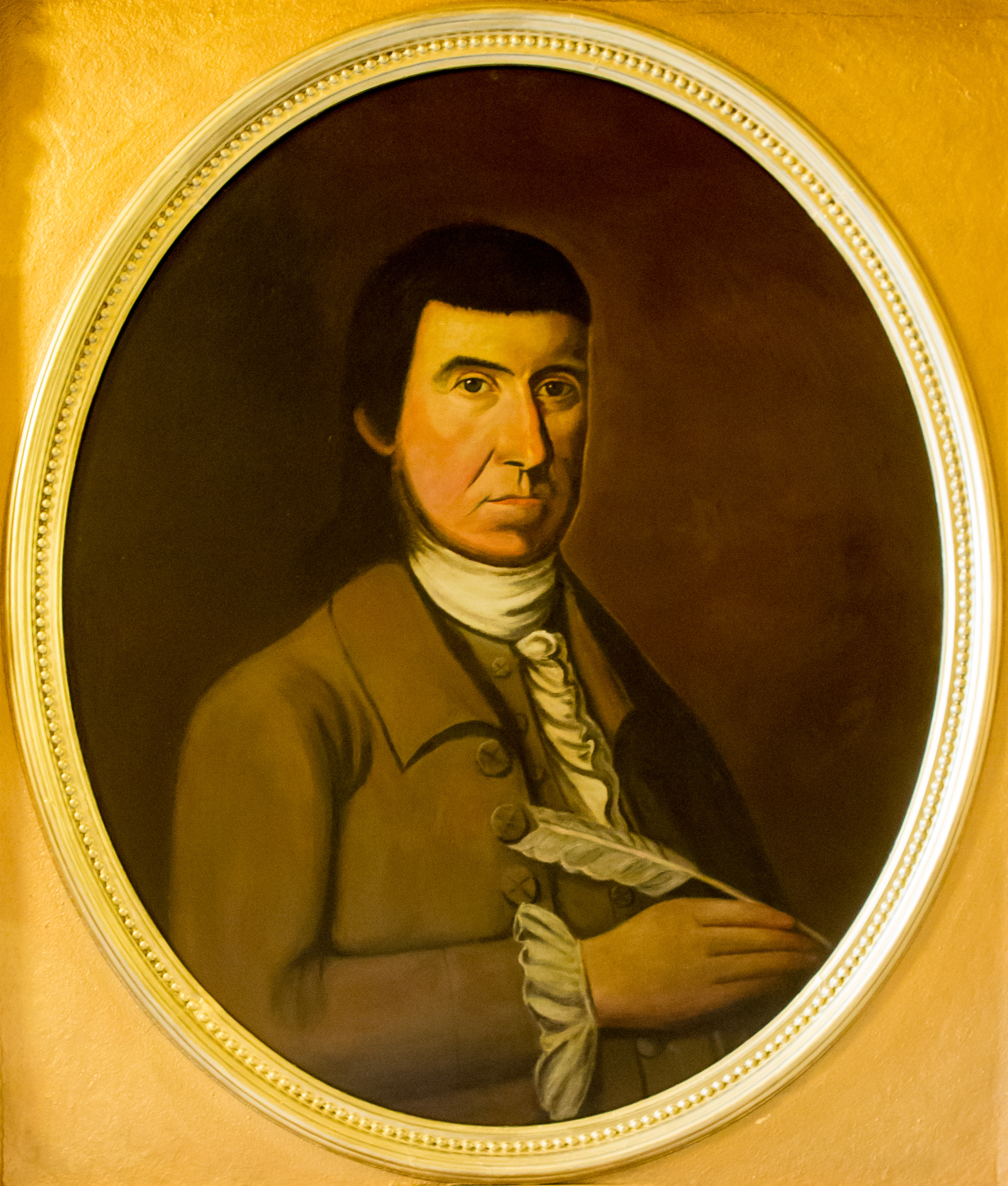
- Portrait of Cooke

1st Governor of Rhode Island
- In office 1776–1778
- Preceded by: Himself (as governor of the Colony of Rhode Island and Providence Plantations)
- Succeeded by: William Greene

37th Governor of the Colony of Rhode Island and Providence Plantations
- In office 1775–1776
- Preceded by: Joseph Wanton
- Succeeded by: himself as governor of the State of Rhode Island and Providence Plantations

41st and 43rd Deputy Governor of the Colony of Rhode Island and Providence Plantations
- In office 1768–1769
- Governor: Josias Lyndon
- Preceded by: Joseph Wanton, Jr.
- Succeeded by: Darius Sessions
- In office 1775–1775
- Governor: Joseph Wanton
- Preceded by: Darius Sessions
- Succeeded by: William Bradford

Personal details
- Born: February 3, 1717 Providence, Colony of Rhode Island, British America
- Died: September 14, 1782 (aged 65) Providence, Rhode Island, U.S.
- Resting place: North Burial Ground
- Spouse: Hannah Sabin
- Occupation: Sea captain, slave trader, merchant, ropemaker, politician, governor

Nicholas Cooke (February 3, 1717 – September 14, 1782) was an American politician, slave-trader, and ropemaker who served as the governor of the Colony of Rhode Island and Providence Plantations during the American Revolutionary War, and after Rhode Island became a state, he continued in this position to become the first Governor of the State of Rhode Island. Born in the maritime town of Providence, he early in life followed the sea, eventually becoming a Captain of ships. This occupation led him to become a slave trader, becoming highly successful in this endeavor, and he ran a distillery and rope-making business as well. He is depicted as one of the affluent merchants in John Greenwood's satirical painting from the 1750s entitled Sea Captains Carousing in Surinam.

Cooke first became politically active in 1752 when elected as an assistant from Providence, which position he held for a total of four years. He devoted most of his energy to mercantile pursuits and local government in the 1760s, and in 1766 represented his Congregational Church in becoming a trustee of the new college in Rhode Island, later named Brown University. In 1768 he was elected as Deputy Governor of the Rhode Island colony under Josias Lyndon as governor. He stepped down from this position after a year, but in 1775, after the war with Great Britain had begun, he was once again elected as deputy governor, this time under Governor Joseph Wanton. Maintaining Loyalist sympathies, Wanton was officially deposed as governor in November 1775, and Cooke was then named to succeed him. When Cooke was re-elected to the governorship in May 1776, the most important act of his tenure took place: by decree of the General Assembly, the Colony of Rhode Island and Providence Plantations officially broke ties with Great Britain, this occurring two months before the signing of the Declaration of Independence by the 13 American colonies.

During the nearly three years of Cooke's tenure as governor, he had to constantly deal with issues stemming from the war with Britain. One of the most difficult situations was the British capture and occupation of Newport, which required evacuation before the British troops arrived. The war took a heavy toll on Cooke, and in 1778 he refused re-election, being replaced by William Greene. Cooke lived for four more years after his retirement, dying in Providence in November 1782. He is buried in the North Burial Ground in Providence.

== Early life ==
Born in Providence in the Colony of Rhode Island and Providence Plantations on February 3, 1717, Nicholas Cooke was the son of Daniel Cooke and Mary Power. Early in his life he followed the sea, and eventually became the master of ships, which led to his later vocation as a merchant. He also operated a distillery and a rope making business. After acquiring a fortune, he invested his assets in land in the colonies of Rhode Island, Massachusetts, and Connecticut.

Cooke first became politically active at the age of 35, when he was elected as an Assistant from Providence in 1752, being elected again to this position three more times within seven years. In the mid-1750s, the Boston portraitist, John Greenwood followed a group of sea captains and merchants to Surinam on the northeast coast of South America. The trading usually took time, so the men often waited in pubs. Being commissioned by the merchants to create a satirical painting, Greenwood concocted a 22-figure tavern scene, showing himself among the affluent traders, all subject to the "intoxicating effects of alcohol and economic ambition." Different accounts agree that Cooke is the man wearing a hat, seated at the back of the table, facing right and smoking a pipe.

Cooke became a trustee of Rhode Island's new college, later named Brown University, in 1766 and served in that role until his death. As a trustee he represented the Beneficent Congregational Church, of which he had been a member since 1747.

In 1768 Cooke became the deputy governor of the colony under Josias Lyndon, both men leaving their offices after one year. As difficulties with Great Britain worsened, and the Continental Congress formed, Cooke became chairman of the Providence Committee of Inspection. He was responsible for seeing that the town faithfully adhered to the declarations of the Congress relating to trade with Great Britain. Some of the provisions included discontinuing the slave trade; refusing to purchase tea; stopping all exports to and imports from Britain; selling goods at reasonable prices, and discouraging horse racing, gaming, expensive shows, and expensive funerals.

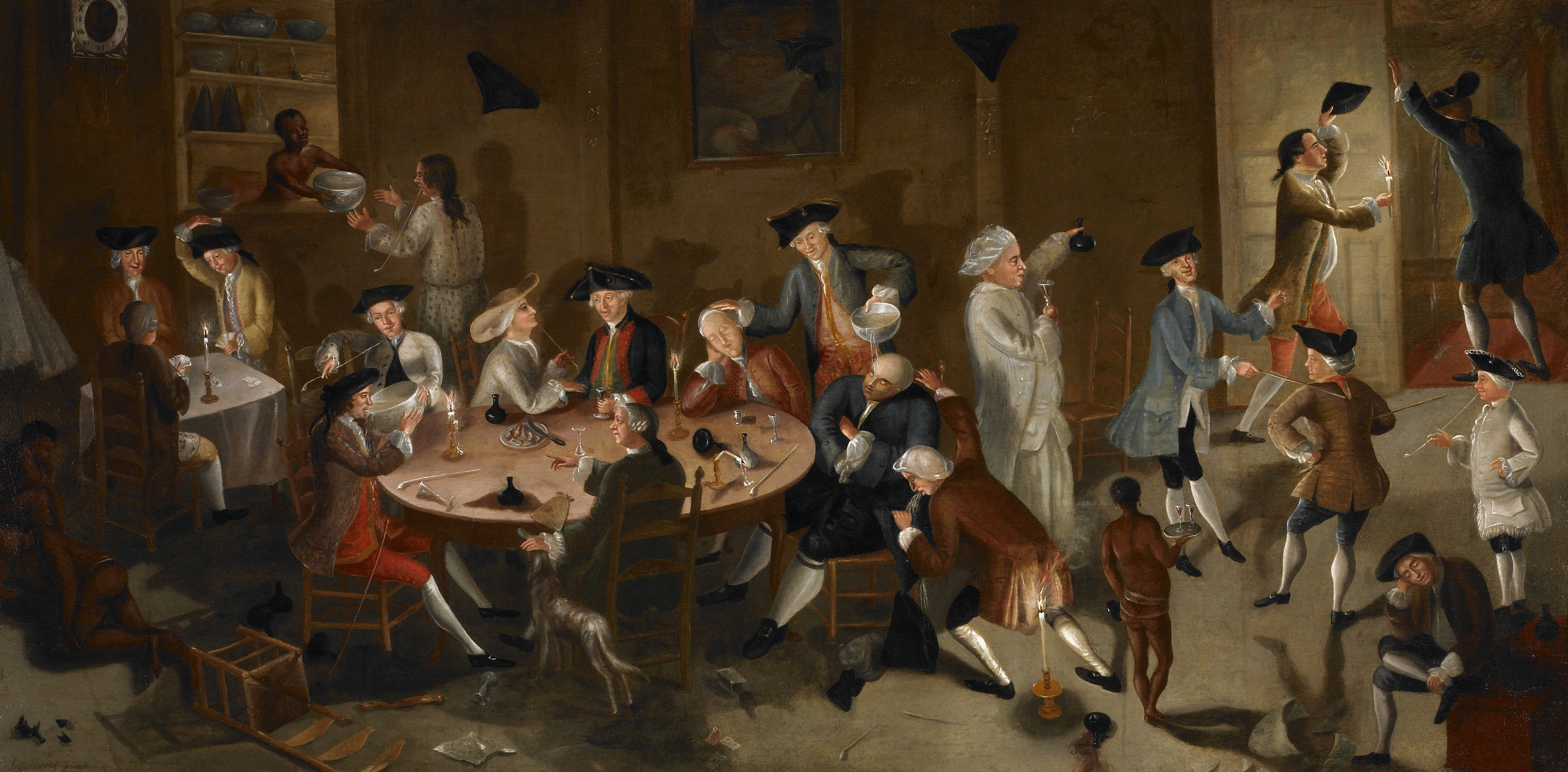
Cooke (facing right at back of table, with pipe) speaking to Esek Hopkins in Sea Captains Carousing in Surinam (1755–1758)

In May 1775, Cooke was once again elected to the office of deputy governor, and Joseph Wanton was elected for the seventh time as governor. Wanton, however, had maintained a very conservative position regarding Great Britain, and did not want to break the ties binding the mother country to the colonies. Meanwhile, the General Assembly took on a strong stance toward independence, and detailed four points against Wanton, after which the magistrates were forbidden to administer to him the oath of office during their June meeting. Wanton refused to approve the creation of an army of 1500 men, would not sign commissions for officers, neglected to issue a proclamation for the fast-day appointed by the Assembly, and did not take an oath of office. Wanton addressed the four points in a letter to the Assembly, but to no effect. Without an impeachment trial, Wanton was suspended from his office, with Cooke becoming acting governor. The suspension act against Wanton was continued during each Assembly session until November, and having failed to give satisfaction to the Assembly, and continuing to manifest Tory sympathies, he was formally deposed on November 7, 1775. Cooke became the governor, with William Bradford of Bristol becoming deputy governor, and served out the remainder of Wanton's term before being elected for two additional one-year terms.

== Governorship ==
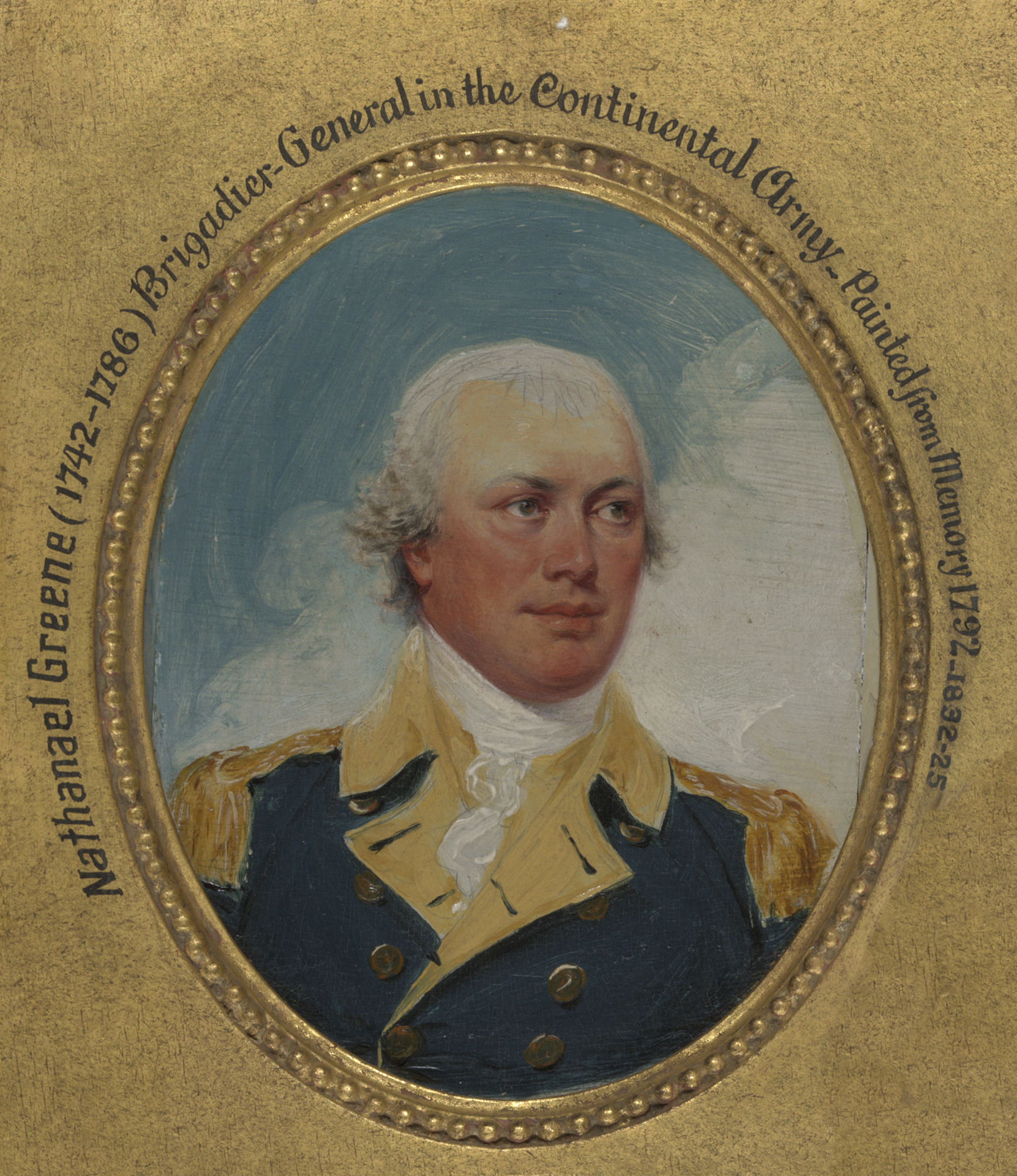
Nathanael Greene, who became commander of the Army of Observations under Cooke's governorship

The town of Newport was highly exposed, being on an island in the Narragansett Bay, and one of the first acts of the Assembly under Cooke involved the removal of the colony's treasures, records and offices from there to Providence. Acts were also passed for raising and equipping troops; defining the pay of officers and men; securing arms, tents and provisions for an army; choosing a Committee of Safety; and choosing officers of the Army of Observations, of which Nathanael Greene was made the Brigadier General. Two vessels were to be manned and armed to protect the trade of the colony, and put under the command of Abraham Whipple, leader of the Gaspee raid, with the rank of Commodore.

Post offices and post riders were established to promote communication between the colonies, and a proclamation was issued commanding every able man in the colony to completely equip himself with arms and ammunition. On September 15, 1775, the General Assembly was persuaded to build and equip an American fleet as soon as possible. This forerunner of the American Navy was placed under the command of Admiral Esek Hopkins, brother of Governor Stephen Hopkins.

The exposed town of Newport was depopulated, with enemy ships sailing freely in the surrounding waters. An act was also passed to encourage the manufacture of saltpeter and gunpowder, required of muskets and artillery pieces. In January a memorial was adopted and forwarded to Congress by Cooke, detailing the exposed condition of the colony with its 130 miles of coastline, two navigable rivers and a hostile fleet in its waters constantly plundering the islands and shores. Cooke enumerated the efforts made by the colony in its own behalf, but also asked for continental aid.

=== Rhode Island declares independence ===
In May 1776 Cooke won the election as governor of the colony, and at the same time the most noteworthy act of his tenure occurred. On 4 May the Assembly met in Providence and passed "the last important act in the colonial history of Rhode Island," the Declaration of Independence of the Rhode Island colony from Great Britain a full two months before the Declaration of Independence of the 13 colonies was signed in Philadelphia. This act repealed a previous Act of Allegiance to the Crown, and declared that the King's name and authority in this colony was void. The courts of law would no longer be considered the King's Courts, and all commissions and writs would no longer be in the name of the King, but instead in the name of the governor and company of this colony. The act was drawn by Colonel Jonathan Arnold, a descendant of Governor Benedict Arnold, and passed the Upper House unanimously, with only six dissenting votes in the Lower House. The phrase "God save the King" was now officially replaced with the phrase "God save the United Colonies." The first act following this local act of independence was to provide instruction to Stephen Hopkins and William Ellery, the colony's two delegates to the Continental Congress.

In late July 1776 the legal title of the government was changed by the General Assembly to "The State of Rhode Island and Providence Plantations." The recording of the Assembly minutes closed with the words "God save the United States."

=== Newport captured and occupied ===
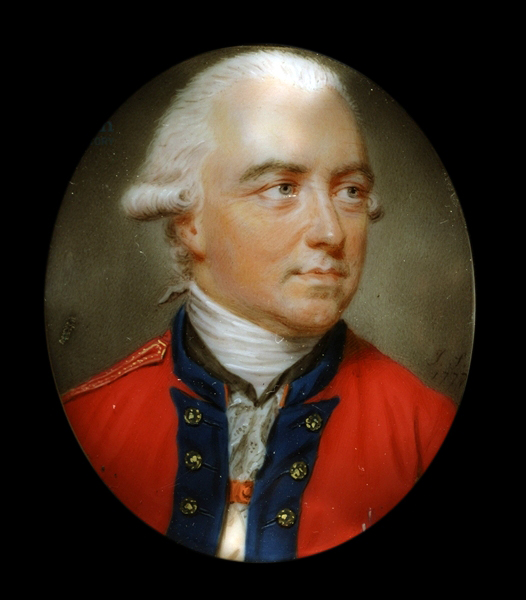
Sir Henry Clinton, who led the British force that captured Newport

The August session of the Assembly was the last to be held in Newport for the next four years, with the pending occupation of Aquidneck Island (Rhode Island) by British Forces. In December 1776 seven ships and four frigates under the command of Sir Peter Parker appeared off Block Island and went up the sound to join a fleet of 70 transports with about 6000 troops, destined for Newport. Summons went out from the colony to as far as New Hampshire for aid. Women and children in seaboard towns had already been advised to move, with their furniture, to the interior, and livestock was driven off from the larger islands. Rhode Island had about 700 troops on the island when the British landed at Middletown. After a night of pillaging, the British troops marched into Newport on December 8 under the command of Major-general Sir Henry Clinton. The Rhode Island troops left the island, moving to Tiverton and Bristol. Assistance poured in from neighboring states, and the Americans assumed defensible positions on each side of the bay.

Providence had been given up to military occupation as well, and the college exercises were suspended, with the building being occupied as a barracks, and then later as a military hospital. General Benedict Arnold was sent by Washington to Providence in January 1777 to assist with the defense of Rhode Island, and the Marquis de Lafayette entered service at the same time, greatly facilitating the American cause. Cooke, desperate for additional troops, ordered a new brigade be raised in Rhode Island. Washington disapproved of the move, fearing it would interfere with the enlistment of the two battalions already assigned to the state. The general wrote two earnest letters on the subject, but when Cooke presented the situation to him, Washington ultimately approved of the plan, and thanked the State for its exertions.

=== Late tenure ===
In May 1777 the same State officers were elected except William Channing replaced Henry Marchant as Attorney General, and Marchant then became Rhode Island's third delegate to the Congress along with Hopkins and Ellery. For the next year Cooke dealt with the issues, often dire, brought about by the war. Weary of his responsibilities after serving for nearly three years as a wartime governor, Cooke retired from office in May 1778, and was replaced by William Greene, the son of former colonial Governor William Greene. In addition to Cooke, his deputy governor, William Bradford, also declined re-election in 1778, and both men were publicly thanked by the General Assembly for "their patriotic zeal, firmness, and intrepidity." Cooke's service and public record, said historian Thomas W. Bicknell, "give a high conception of the excellent good sense and wise judgment of the Governor."

Cooke died on November 14, 1782, and was buried in the North Burial Ground in Providence.

== Family ==
In 1740 Cooke married Hannah, the daughter of Hezekiah Sabin, with whom he had 12 children. One of his descendants was the Honorable George L. Cooke of Providence. His son Joseph S. Cooke (b. 1746) captained a ship on a number of trading voyages to Africa and the West Indies. His daughter Sarah (1755–1843) married Continental Army Colonel Jeremiah Olney on April 26, 1780. The couple had one child, Mary T. Olney (1799–1878).

== See also ==
- List of governors of Rhode Island
- List of colonial governors of Rhode Island
- List of lieutenant governors of Rhode Island
- Colony of Rhode Island and Providence Plantations
