= Clifton Burying Ground =

Cemetery in Newport, Rhode Island, US

Coordinates: 41°28′59″N 71°18′39″W

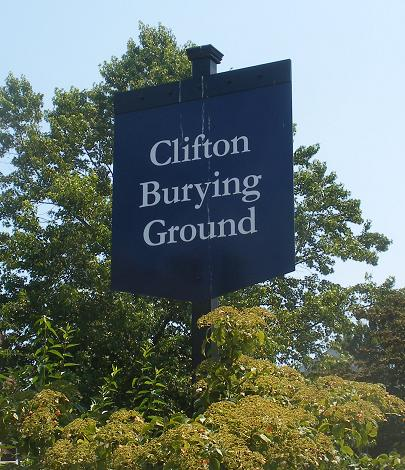
- Sign on Golden Hill Street
- Interactive map of Clifton Burying Ground

Details
- Established: 1675
- Location: Newport, Rhode Island
- Country: United States
- Type: Denominational (Quaker)
- Owned by: Private
- No. of graves: 168

The Clifton Burying Ground is an early colonial cemetery located in Newport, Rhode Island, United States. It is a Quaker cemetery, and has the graves of four Rhode Island colonial governors.

== Description ==
The Clifton Burying Ground is located in Newport, Rhode Island where Golden Hill Street bends and becomes Thomas Street. The cemetery is named for Thomas Clifton, who gave the land to the Society of Friends for a burial ground in 1675, though some who are presumably buried here died much earlier than that. The cemetery has 168 known interments, including four colonial Rhode Island governors: Jeremy Clarke, Walter Clarke, William Wanton and Joseph Wanton. There is an inscription in this cemetery for Governor John Wanton as well, but he has a marker in the Coddington Cemetery on Farewell Street, and that is where he is likely buried. Neither cemetery has a governor's grave medallion for him, while this cemetery has medallions for all four of the other governors.

The person with the earliest death date buried here is Governor Jeremy Clarke, who died in January 1652, and who has a governor's medallion, but no tombstone. If he is actually buried here, then he was likely moved from another location. The latest interment was for Sarah Howland who died in 1856.

== Image gallery ==
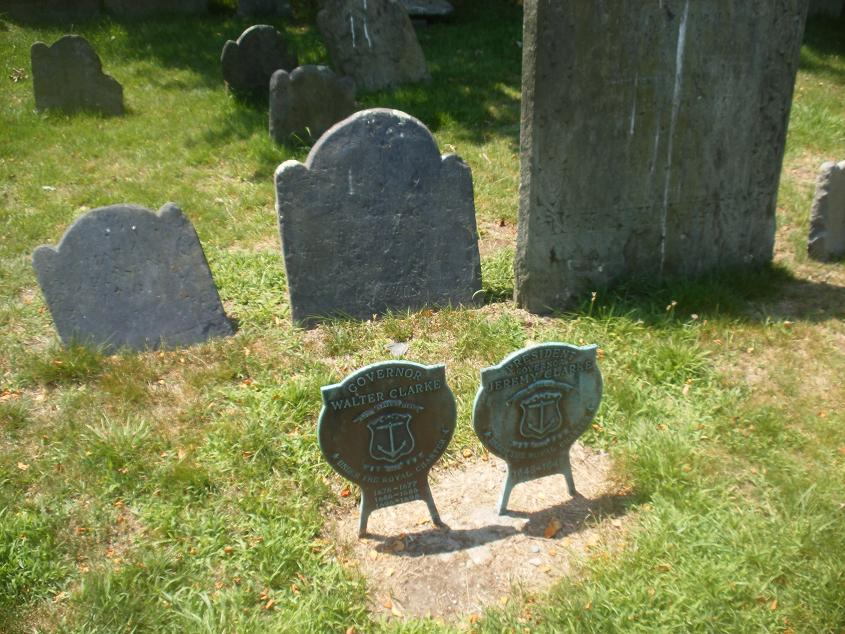
Governor's medallions for Walter Clarke and Jeremy Clarke in front of the gravestone of the former

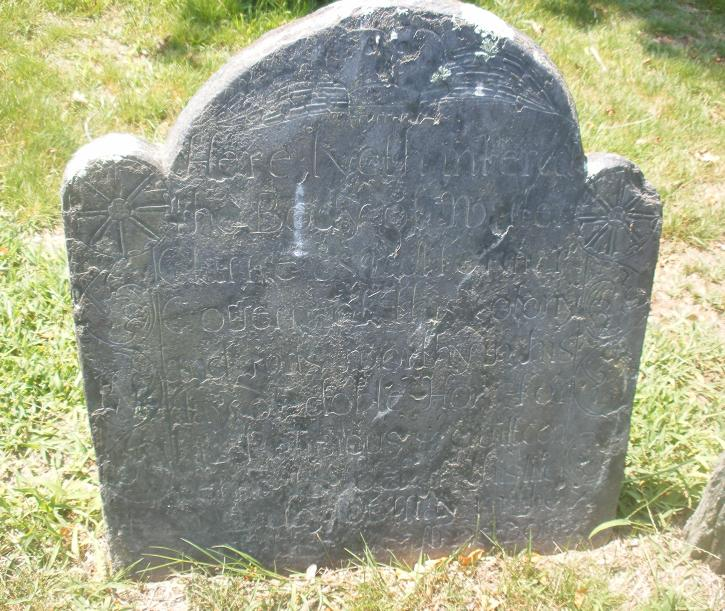
Gravestone for Governor Walter Clarke

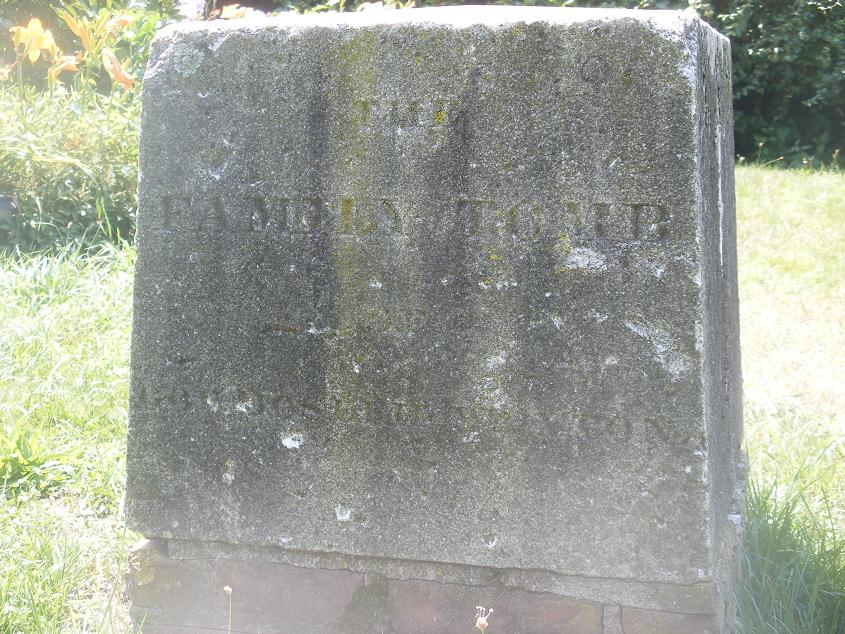
Wanton family memorial

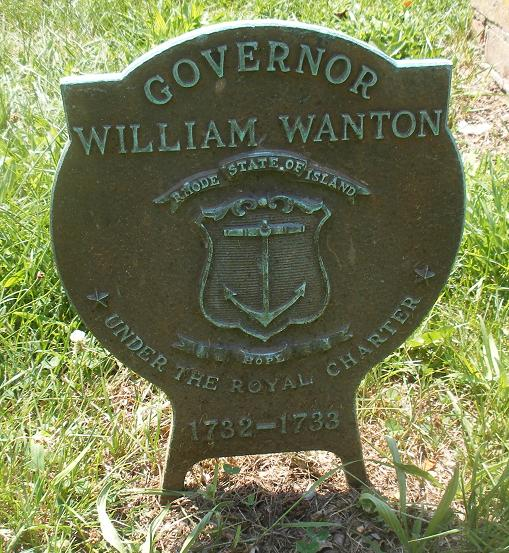
William Wanton governor's medallion

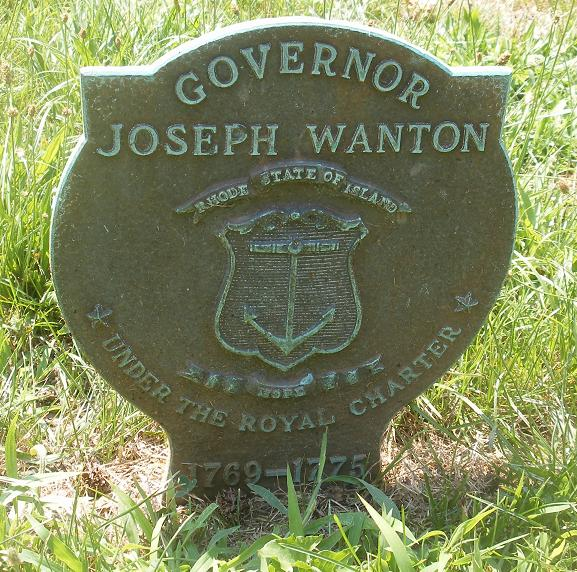
Joseph Wanton governor's medallion

== See also ==
- Category:Burials at Clifton Burying Ground
