= Joseph Wanton =

Colonial Governor of Rhode Island (1705–1780)

Joseph Wanton Sr.
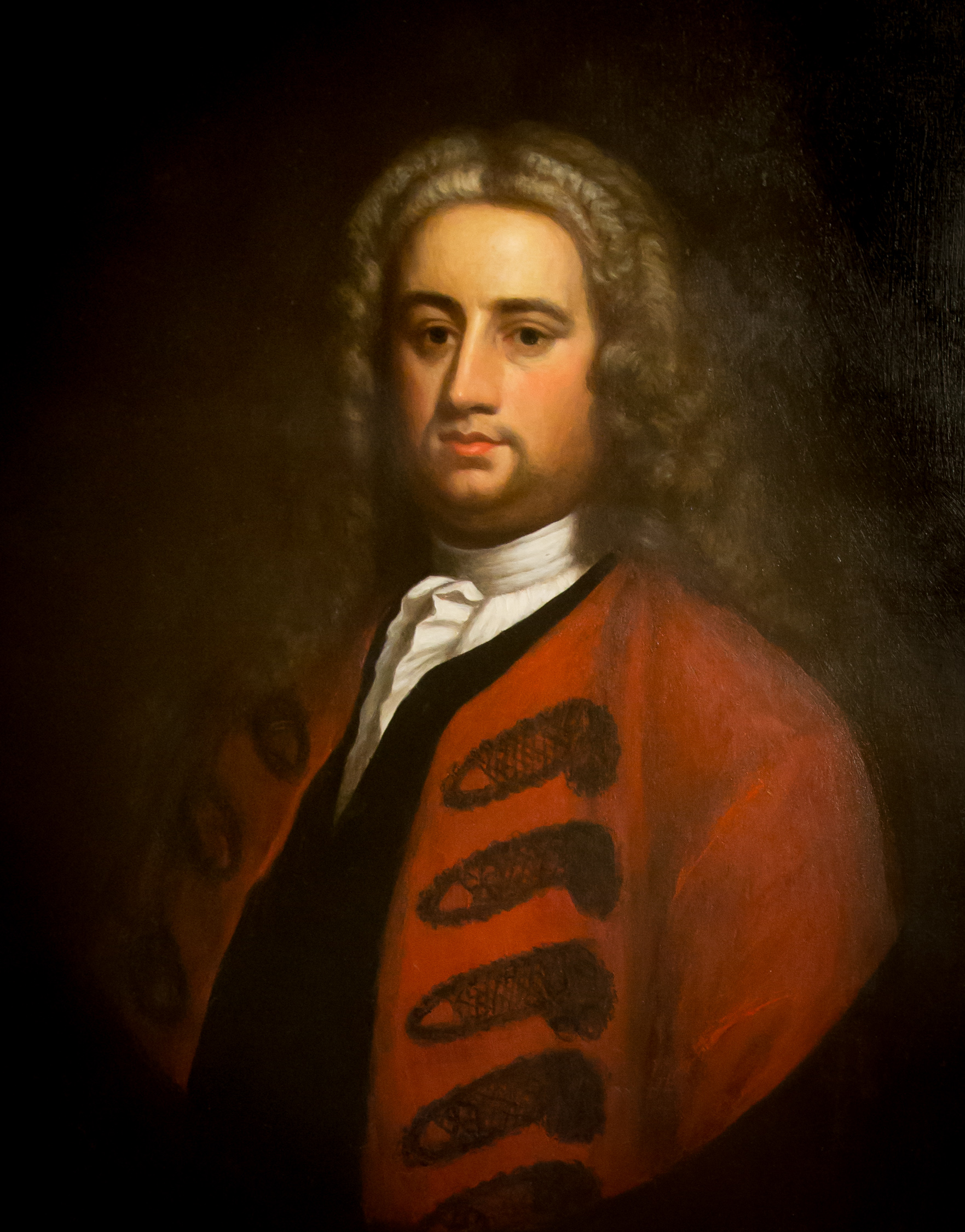
- Portrait of Wanton

36th Governor of Rhode Island
- In office 1769–1775
- Preceded by: Josias Lyndon
- Succeeded by: Nicholas Cooke

Personal details
- Born: 15 August 1705 Newport, Rhode Island
- Died: 19 July 1780 (aged 74)
- Resting place: Clifton Burying Ground, Newport
- Spouse: Mary Winthrop
- Occupation: Merchant, governor
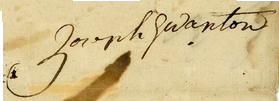
- Signature

Joseph Wanton Sr. (15 August 1705 – 19 July 1780) was an American merchant and colonial administrator who served as the governor of Rhode Island from 1769 to 1775. Not wanting to go to war with Britain, he has been branded as a Loyalist, but he remained neutral during the war, and he and his property were not disturbed.

Born in Newport of a prominent Quaker family that was very involved in Rhode Island politics, Wanton became a highly successful merchant. He is depicted in the satirical 1750s painting by John Greenwood, Sea Captains Carousing in Surinam, with other prominent merchants and seamen from the colony. As a merchant, he was involved in the trade of most goods, including slaves, and at one point his ship with a cargo of rum and slaves was confiscated off the coast of Africa by a French privateer.

With no known civic background, Wanton was elected as governor of the colony in 1769, and served for six years. With the American Revolutionary War on the horizon, he was involved with a large array of issues and incidents, most notably the Gaspee Affair in 1772, where he played an important role in thwarting the crown from finding the members of the group of colonists that boarded and burned the royal schooner Gaspee. The formation of the Continental Congress took place during his administration, and he was in continuous communication with governors of other colonies. He also became a founder and trustee of the new college in the Rhode Island colony, eventually named Brown University.

As the Revolutionary War approached, members of the General Assembly were getting very hawkish, and when Wanton was elected for the seventh time in 1775, he refused to agree to the raising of an army of 1500 men, and would not commission new officers. He also would not immediately take the oath of office, and for these reasons the Assembly refused to seat him as governor, and formally removed him from office a few months later, with Nicholas Cooke taking his place. While he was not overtly Loyalist, he did not see a war with Great Britain to be in the interest of the colony. He retired to his home in Newport where he was undisturbed during the war, and died before its conclusion, in 1780.

== Early life ==
Born in Newport in the Colony of Rhode Island and Providence Plantations on 15 August 1705, Wanton was the seventh of nine children born to William Wanton and his first wife, Ruth Bryant. His father had been a governor of the colony, as had his uncle John Wanton and his older first cousin, Gideon Wanton. His grandfather, Edward Wanton, was a ship builder, who became a Quaker after witnessing the persecution of these people, and became a speaker (preacher) of that religion. His grandfather had lived in York, Maine; Boston, Massachusetts; and Scituate, Massachusetts, and though he likely never lived in Rhode Island, many of his children settled in Newport or other parts of the colony. Though Wanton was of a Quaker background, his mother was a Presbyterian, and as a compromise, her children were raised in the Anglican faith.

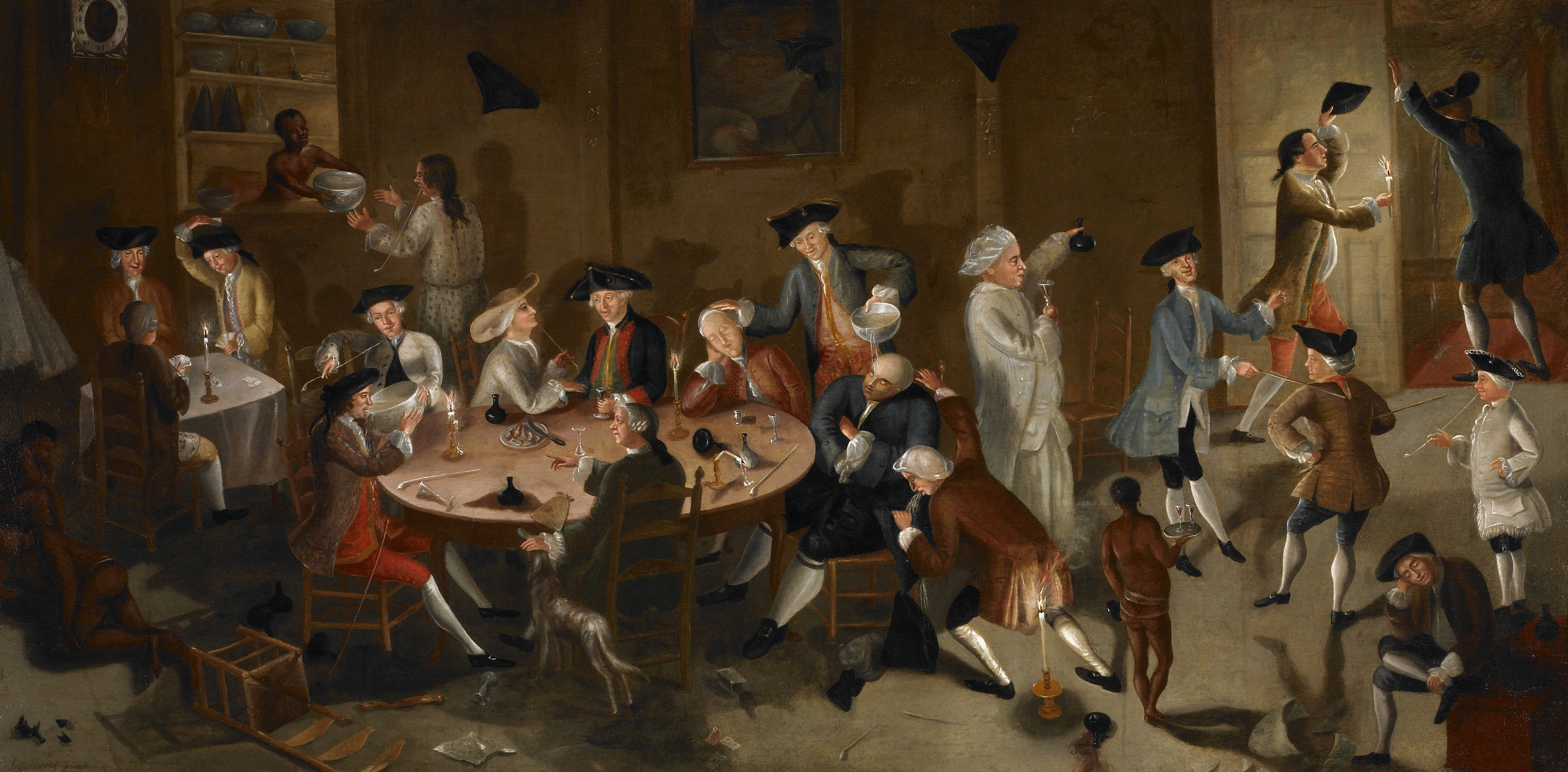
Wanton (sleeping and being doused with punch and vomit) in Sea Captains Carousing in Surinam (1755–1758)

While some sources say he graduated from Harvard College in 1751, it is far more likely that this was his 21-year-old son, Joseph Jr., rather than the 46-year-old Wanton, who was by then a highly successful merchant sailing the globe in pursuit of commercial interests. That he was well educated, however, is certain from the vast amount of correspondence in which he engaged, particularly as governor of the colony. In the mid-1750s, the Boston portraitist, John Greenwood, followed a group of sea captains and merchants to Surinam on the northeast coast of South America. The trading usually took time, so the men often waited in pubs. Being commissioned by the merchants to create a satirical painting, Greenwood concocted a twenty-two-figure tavern scene, showing himself among the affluent traders, all subject to the "intoxicating effects of alcohol and economic ambition." Most accounts agree that Wanton is the bald man slumped in a chair by the table, being doused with a pitcher of rum, by one account, or of punch and vomit, by other accounts.

As a merchant, Wanton was involved in the maritime trade of a variety of goods. During the first half of the 18th century the slave trade was booming in Newport, and from 1708 to 1755 the population of black slaves in the colony burgeoned from 220 to nearly 4700. In 1758 Wanton declared that he had sailed the Snow King of Prussia with a cargo of 124 hogsheads of rum and 54 slaves. While at anchor along the African coast, he and his cargo were captured by a French privateer.

In 1765 Wanton became one of the founders of the new college in Rhode Island, called the College in the English Colony of Rhode Island and Providence Plantations, and later named Brown University. He is named as an original "corporator," and as an original trustee of the college.

== Governorship ==
There is no evidence that Wanton held any important office in the colony prior to his election as governor in May 1769. Once elected, his first act was to send a letter to Lord Hillsborough, the Colonial Secretary of State, with whom his predecessor, Josias Lyndon, had corresponded. In the letter he boldly stated that it was not possible for him as governor to obey the instructions of the crown "without acting diametrically opposite to the constitution of the colony...; we cannot but humbly express our opinion that the power exercised by the Parliament of Great Britain (in which we are not represented), of raising monies upon us without our consent (which it is possible under a bad administration, may be extended to our last penny), is a real grievance; we are not without hopes that his Majesty's rejecting our petition, is entirely owing to the false information he hath received from America, of the state and temper of his subjects here."

Disquiet among the American colonists caused by irritants such as the Stamp Act mounted during the 1760s, and the decade drew to a close with the most serious event yet. In July 1769 the British revenue ship Liberty brought into the Newport harbor two Connecticut vessels, a brig and a sloop, suspected of smuggling. When some difficulty arose between the officers of the Liberty and those of the brig, the captain of the brig was fired upon from the Liberty. That evening some Newport citizens, who considered the seizure of the two vessels to be an outrage, boarded the Liberty and scuttled it, while the two captured vessels sailed away. This was the first overt act of violence of the colonies against Great Britain, and showed the temperament of the people towards the British customs officers. Wanton issued a proclamation for the arrest of the guilty parties, but no arrests were ever made.

=== Gaspee Affair ===
In March 1772, the people of the colony were harassed by his Majesty's schooner Gaspee, with eight guns, stationed in the Narragansett Bay to enforce the revenue acts. The commander, Lieutenant William Dudingston, had engaged in a number of annoyances upon vessels in the bay, detaining them without pretext, stopping market boats, and sometimes plundering the people ashore. He violated the charter of the colony by acting without showing his commission. The inhabitants of Providence complained to Deputy Governor Darius Sessions, who consulted with Chief Justice Stephen Hopkins, who offered the opinion "that no commander of any vessel has a right to use any authority in the body of the colony, without previously applying to the governor, and showing his warrant for so doing, and also being sworn to a due exercise of his office."

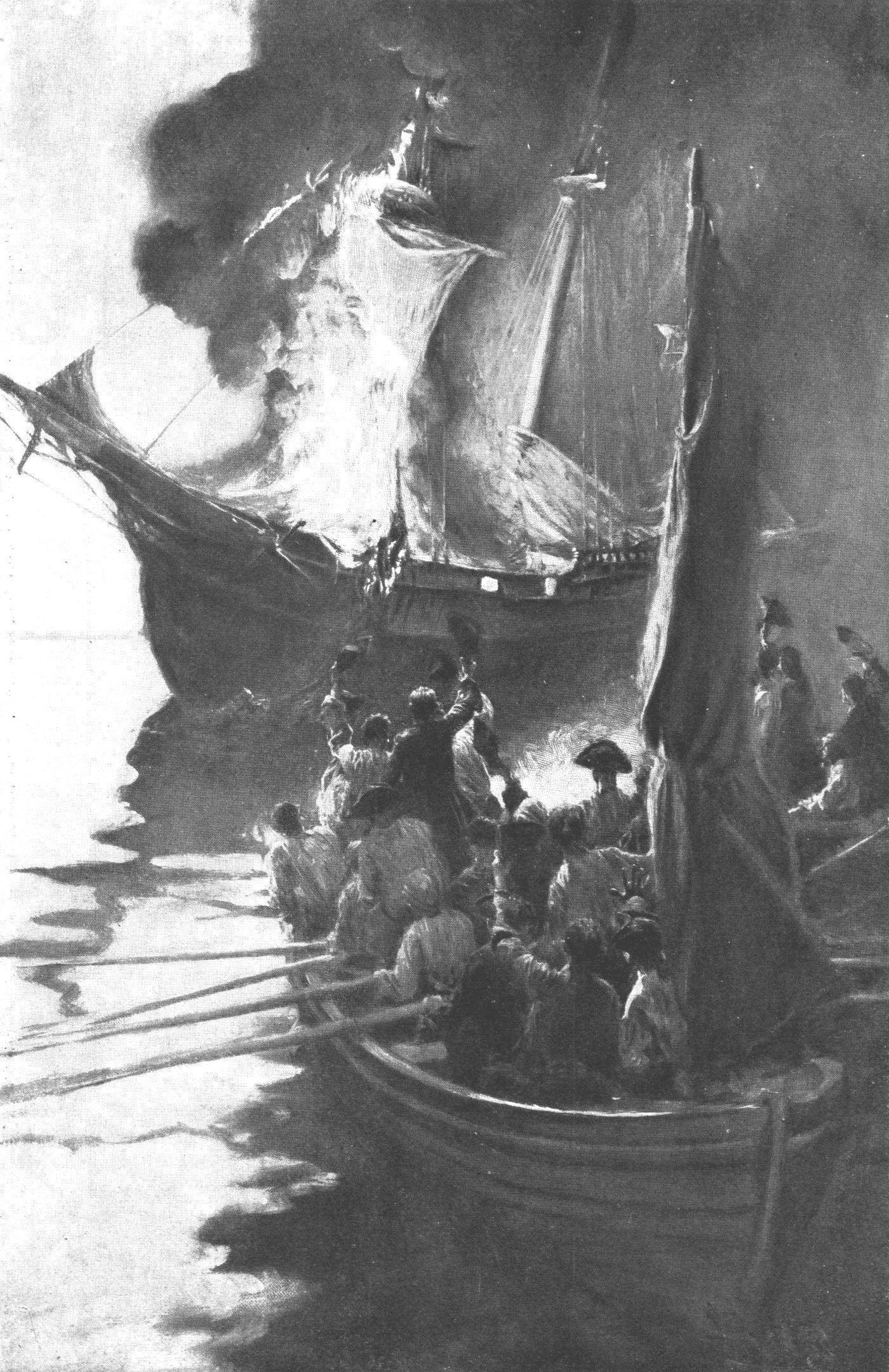
Burning of the Gaspée

Sessions then communicated the complaints, with Hopkins' opinion, to Wanton, who immediately sent a letter to the commanding officer requiring him to produce his commission and instructions. The next day, Dudingston sent an arrogant reply, to which Wanton replied directly, repeating his demand, and assuring Dudingston of safety in coming to shore. Dudingston then enclosed the correspondence in a letter to his superior officer, Admiral Montagu, in Boston, who sided with the lieutenant, addressing an extremely insolent letter to Wanton, defending the commander and ridiculing the governor, suggesting that those interfering with the crown's activities could "hang as pirates." Wanton then informed Montagu "that I do not receive instructions for the administration of my government from the King's Admiral stationed in America." He then presented the chain of correspondence to the General Assembly, and directed that copies of the correspondence be sent to England. Wanton also wrote Lord Hillsborough, complaining of Montagu's insolence, and detailing the conduct of the Gaspee.

On 8 June 1772 the sloop Hannah, coming from New York, arrived in Newport, reported to the custom house, and the next day proceeded up the river. The Gaspee, in its customary fashion, gave chase, but ran aground on Namquit (later called Gaspee Point), near Pawtuxet, and the Hannah escaped to Providence. That evening, by beat of drum, men were called to the house of James Sabin to organize an attack on the Gaspee. John Brown provided eight long-boats of five oars each, and shortly after 10 p.m., the party headed towards the Gaspee, commanded by Captain Abraham Whipple. Well after midnight the party approached the vessel, and when hailed, did not answer the ship's sentinel. This prompted Dudingston himself to hail, again without answer. A second hail by the commander was then answered with profanity by Whipple, who ordered his men to spring to their oars. Shots were fired in both directions, and a musket ball fired by Joseph Bucklin hit Dudingston in the groin, and as he fell, the attackers boarded the schooner, and took over the vessel. The crew of the schooner was overtaken, bound, and put on shore, while Dudingston was attended to by Dr. John Mawney. A milestone had been reached; this was the first British blood shed in the American Revolution. After removing the crew, the captors set fire to the vessel, and then returned to Providence.

A report was sent by a crew member to Montagu, who then forwarded a copy to Wanton with the request to apprehend the offenders. Wanton then issued his proclamation, offering 100 pounds reward for evidence sufficient for conviction of the guilty parties. An active correspondence then ensued between Wanton, the Admiral, and Lieutenant Dudingston, with an account of the event sent to Lord Hillsborough. An escaped slave who was with the expedition gave names of some of the men involved to Admiral Montagu, who then forwarded this deposition to Wanton, requesting that the instigators be questioned. Wanton, instead of obeying the request, took depositions invalidating the testimony of the slave. When news reached England, George III issued a proclamation offering a reward of £1000 each for either of the leaders of the expedition, and £500 for each of the other involved parties. Wanton, along with others from neighboring colonies, was commissioned to inquire into the report upon the facts.

The perpetrators of the Gaspee incident were well known, and among the most prominent citizens of the colony. Some of the younger and more rash of the accomplices had openly boasted of the events, while the ship still smoldered off the shore. Wanton and the other Rhode Island leaders were successful in subtly hampering the progress of the investigations, and amid all of the communications, commissions, claims, and counter claims, the court could not obtain enough direct evidence to indict a single person.

=== Approach to war ===
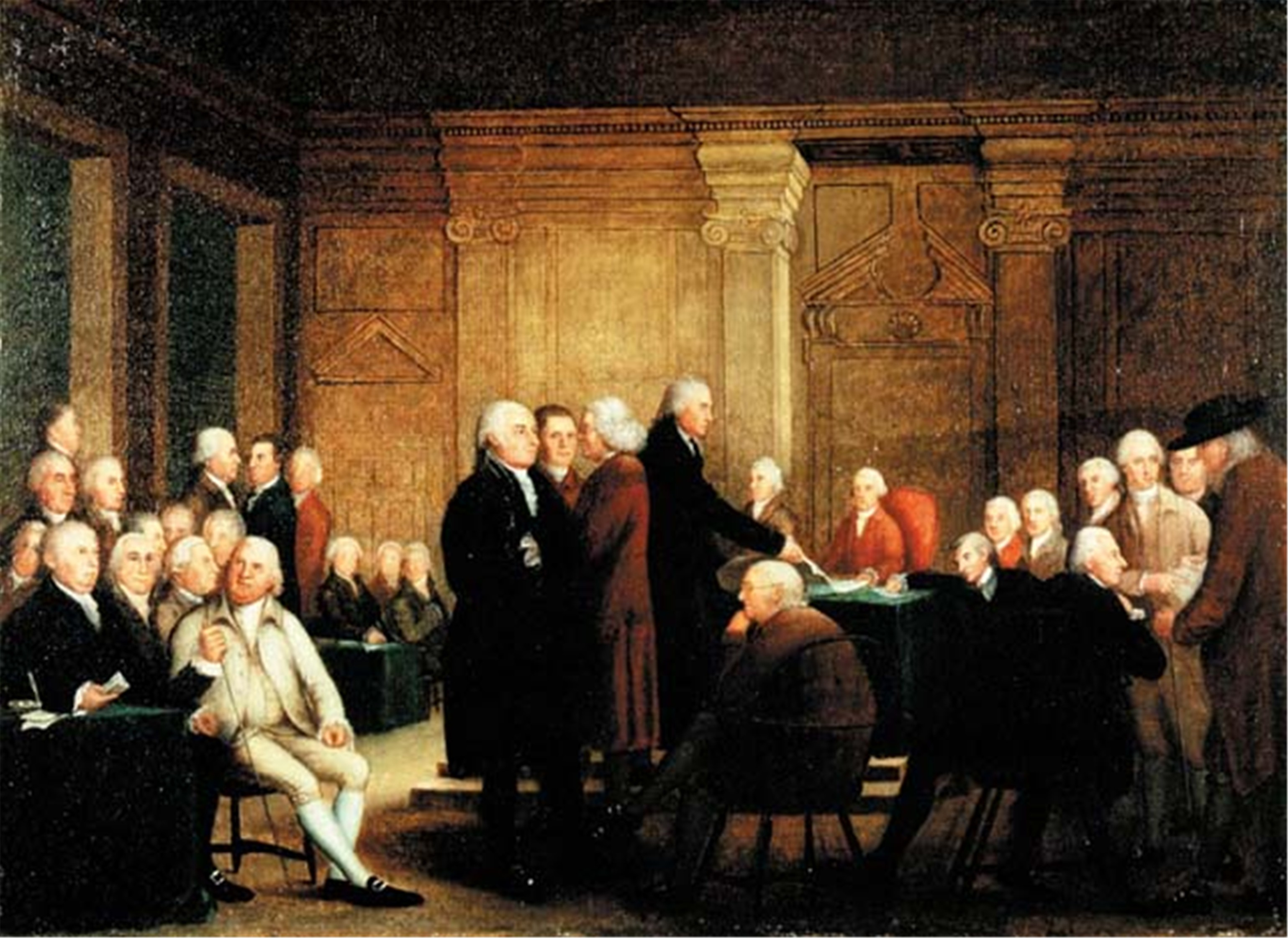
Continental Congress

At some point during Wanton's tenure as governor the inhabitants of Providence urged the General Assembly to prohibit the importation of black slaves into the colony. They further wanted black slaves born in the colony to be freed at a certain age. These were "in a measure" adopted by the Assembly. In early 1773, a movement to unite the colonies was underway. Resolutions advising the appointment of inter-colonial committees of correspondence were unanimously passed, and sent to every colony for approval and adoption. In May 1774, the first explicit movement for a Continental Congress was made at a meeting in Providence, and within a few weeks delegates were elected to attend. Of the 13 colonies, all but Georgia sent representatives to the congress, with Rhode Island's delegates being Stephen Hopkins and Samuel Ward.

On 19 April 1775, the Battle of Lexington began the long-anticipated war between the colonies and Britain. Three days later the Rhode Island General Assembly, sympathetic of Massachusetts, passed an act for raising 1500 men as an army of observation, prepared to assist any sister colonies. On 25 April Governor Wanton, Deputy Governor Darius Sessions and two others signed a protest against raising an army of observation "because we are of the opinion that such a measure will be attended with the most fatal consequences to our charter privileges, [and] involve the country in all the horrors of a civil war."

=== Removal from office ===
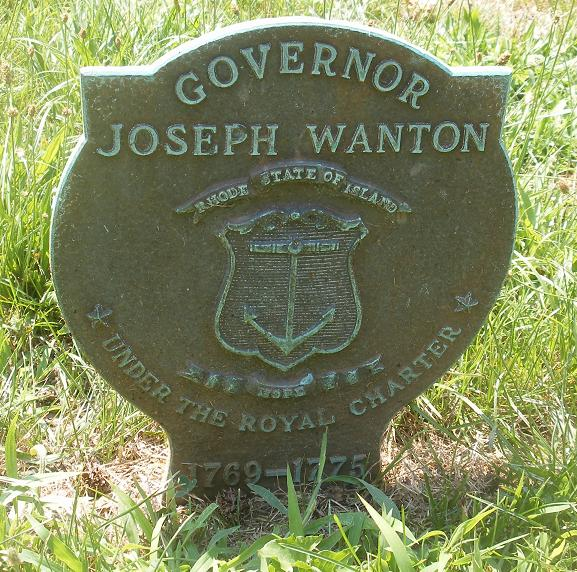
Governor Wanton grave medallion, Clifton Burying Ground, Newport, Rhode Island

At the May 1775 session of the Assembly, Wanton was elected governor for his seventh term, but Nicholas Cooke replaced Sessions as deputy governor. A resolution of the Assembly outlined a number of grievances against Wanton, some being that he protested raising an army; he refused to commission officers to command the troops; and he failed to attend the Assembly and take the oath of office. Wanton sent a calm reply to this resolution, but continued his opposition to the army and the commissions. This was not satisfactory to the patriots in the General Assembly, and at the June session of the Assembly Wanton was excused from office, without an impeachment trial, then formally removed in November, and Deputy Governor Cooke fulfilled the duties of his office until the next election.

While critics treated Wanton harshly for his actions, and branded him as a loyalist, he did have valid concerns about going to war with the mother country. He was a resident of Newport, the wealthiest community of its size in the colonies. A war with the home government would likely cause loss of wealth and social rank in the town. As an important seaport center, the occupation and devastation of the town was also likely. On 2 May 1775, Wanton wrote in a letter, "The prosperity and happiness of this colony is founded in its connection with Great Brittain; for if once we are separated, where shall we find another Britain to supply our loss? Torn from the body to which we are united by religion, liberty, laws and commerce, we must bleed at every vein."

Following his removal from office, Wanton retired to private life, occupying a strict neutrality, and giving aid to neither side. Neither he nor his property were disturbed by the British, and he died in 1780, being buried in the Clifton Burying Ground where several other Quaker governors are buried.

== Family ==
This image, thought to have been of Governor Wanton is actually of Samuel Browne Jr. of Salem, Massachusetts, who married Katharine Winthrop, the great granddaughter of Governor John Winthrop Jr.

Wanton married Mary, the daughter of John Still Winthrop of New London in the Connecticut Colony, the great granddaughter of Connecticut colonial Governor, John Winthrop Jr., and a great great granddaughter of Massachusetts colonial Governor and Boston founder John Winthrop. They had eight children, the oldest of whom, Joseph Wanton Jr. was a deputy governor of the colony for two terms, but also an overt Loyalist whose Newport property was confiscated after the Americans retook control of Newport. While Wanton himself was outwardly neutral during the war, his sentiments leaned heavily toward the British, with not only his son being a Loyalist, but several of his daughters marrying prominent British officials. His chest of drawers is at the Chipstone Foundation. The chest was made in Newport, Rhode Island.

== See also ==
- List of colonial governors of Rhode Island
- Colony of Rhode Island and Providence Plantations
