= Darius Sessions =

Deputy governor of Rhode island

42nd Deputy Governor of the Colony of Rhode Island and Providence Plantations
- In office 1769–1775
- Governor: Joseph Wanton
- Preceded by: Nicholas Cooke
- Succeeded by: Nicholas Cooke

Personal details
- Born: 17 August 1717 Pomfret, Connecticut
- Died: 27 April 1809 (aged 91) Connecticut
- Resting place: North Burial Ground, Providence, Rhode Island
- Spouse: Sarah Antram
- Children: Mary, Sarah, Anne, William H., Darius, George, Elizabeth, Amey, Nathaniel, Thomas
- Occupation: Deputy Governor

Darius Sessions (17 August 1717 – 27 April 1809) was a deputy governor of the Colony of Rhode Island and Providence Plantations during the buildup to the American Revolutionary War. He was heavily involved in moderating the effects of the Gaspee Affair, and was instrumental in keeping the perpetrators from being identified.

== Early life ==
Born in Pomfret, Connecticut, Sessions was the son of Nathaniel Sessions and Joanna Corbin. His family was fairly well-to-do, and owned a lot of land in eastern Connecticut. Sessions attended Yale College, graduating in 1737, and subsequently worked in Rhode Island in the mercantile business. In 1746, during King George's War, he was part owner of the privateer sloop Reprisal. Later, in 1750, he was the master of the schooner Smithfield, working in the West Indies. He was also likely involved in the distillery business of his father-in-law, William Antram, who had a stillhouse just north of Sessions' home in Providence. About 1763, he bankrolled the efforts of his brother, Captain Amasa Sessions, to raise a company of soldiers to fight in the French and Indian War.

Sessions became a close friend of Brown University's first president, James Manning, and has been credited with the university being located in Providence, instead of Newport or Warren. In 1763 he became an Assistant, and in 1769 was elected as deputy governor of the colony, replacing Joseph Wanton who became the new governor.

== Gaspee Affair ==
In March 1772 Sessions, working in Providence, sent a letter of concern to Governor Wanton in Newport. He expressed alarm at a British schooner that had been cruising the Narragansett Bay, disrupting the traffic by stopping and searching commercial ships. Sessions requested that the governor take measures to bring the ship's commander to account. A chain of threatening correspondence ensued between the governor and the commander of the Gaspee, Lieutenant William Dudingston, and the commander's superior, Admiral John Montagu.

On the night of 9–10 June, a party of incensed colonists attacked the vessel, and burned it to the waterline. Officially, Sessions was outraged at the incident, and offered the colony's assistance in bringing the perpetrators to justice. To ameliorate retribution by the British authorities, Rhode Island officials took visible steps to find the culprits who burned the ship. Behind the scenes, however, Sessions did all he could to thwart any attempts to identify and find the attackers. When a royal commission was appointed by the British to investigate the incident, they demanded that any indicted person be sent to England for trial. This egregious threat to local liberty prompted the colonists to form the Committees of Correspondence.

Loyalist Massachusetts Governor Hutchinson further aggravated the colonists sensitivities by urging Britain to rescind the Rhode Island charter.

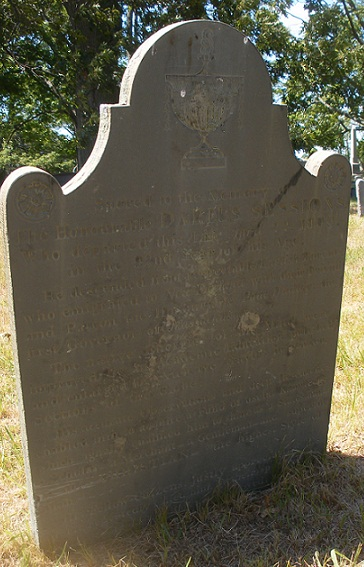
Sessions' grave marker, North Burial Ground, Providence

Sessions conferred with Chief Justice Stephen Hopkins and lawyer John Cole, then appealed to Massachusetts' statesman Samuel Adams, who urged Rhode Island to remain defiant, or at least to stall matters by appealing the creation of the royal commission. Governor Wanton was put at the head of this commission, but was compliant with Sessions' and Hopkins' attempts to frustrate the aims of the commission.

Sessions, Hopkins, and others coordinated their efforts to lose evidence, threaten potential witnesses, and discredit those who testified. In particular, Sessions attacked the reliability of Aaron Briggs and Stephen Gulley, the former of whom gave the names of some of the attackers. The vast majority of Rhode Island's citizens were supportive of the attackers, and kept quiet about their identities. A year after the incident, the royal commission was terminated without a single indictment.

== Later life ==
In 1774 Sessions was put in charge of Rhode Island's military preparedness. Both he and Wanton did not want a standing army in Rhode Island, out of fear of inspiring British retribution. In the election of 1775, Sessions was replaced as Deputy Governor by Nicholas Cooke, but Wanton was re-elected as governor. The hawkish state legislature prevented Wanton from being sworn in as governor, and he was deposed in November 1775, becoming a confirmed Loyalist, and being replaced by Cooke. Sessions, on the other hand, wrote a letter to the General Assembly asking for forgiveness for his earlier positions, and "was received into their favor and friendship."

Sessions had returned to his farm in Connecticut, which he had reconstituted as a stately colonial mansion. His farm then became a command center during the Revolutionary War, and even George Washington visited on occasion.

Following the war, Sessions stayed out of the public spotlight. In 1795, he and his son Thomas were involved in shipping between Rhode Island and St. Croix. Sessions died on 27 April 1809 at the age of 91, still with "full strength of mind." He was returned to Providence to be buried in the North Burial Ground beside his wife, Sarah.

== See also ==
- List of lieutenant governors of Rhode Island
- List of colonial governors of Rhode Island
- Colony of Rhode Island and Providence Plantations
