= Sea Captains Carousing in Surinam =

Painting by John Greenwood

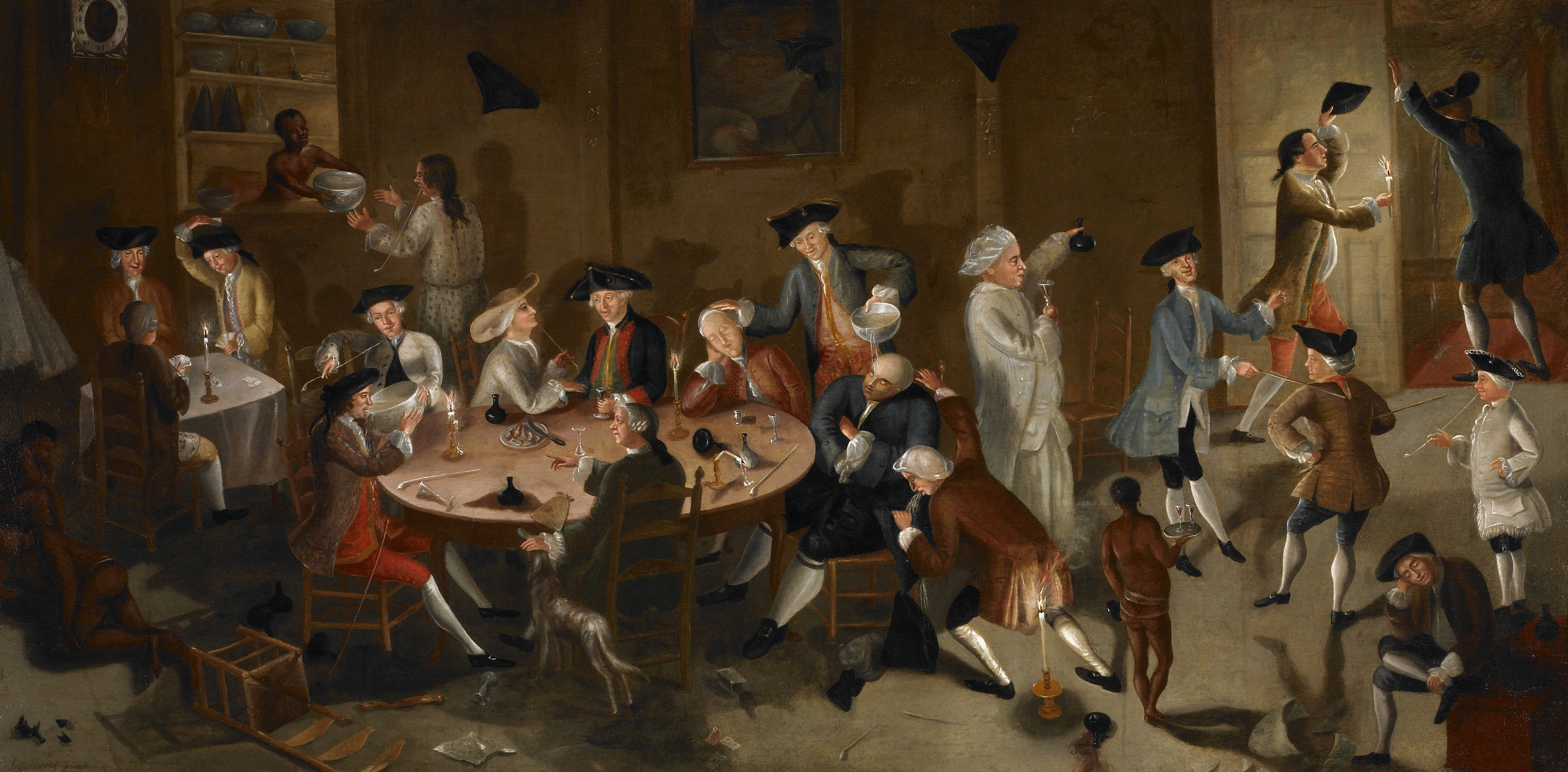
The painting

Sea Captains Carousing in Surinam is an oil-on-canvas painting by the American John Greenwood made between 1755 and 1758. It depicts a humorous scene in a tavern in the Dutch colony of Surinam, with several merchants and sea captains from colonial Rhode Island enjoying themselves. The work has been described as the first genre painting in American art history. It was commissioned by the Rhode Islanders depicted in the painting, probably for their own amusement. At the time, Greenwood was living in Surinam.

The subjects in the painting include Nicholas Cooke, sitting at the table smoking a pipe, speaking to Esek Hopkins; the sleeping man next to him is possibly one of his brothers, either Stephen Hopkins or William Hopkins Jr.); a man then pours a drink (perhaps rum punch) from a porcelain bowl onto the head of a man who has passed out in a chair (possibly this is Joseph Wanton or Esek and Stephen Hopkins's father, William Hopkins Sr.); John Jenckes's brother-in-law Ambrose Page is shown vomiting into the sleeping man's pocket. Cooke and Wanton were both later Governors of Rhode Island, Esek Hopkins was a commander in the Continental Navy from 1775 to 1778, and Founding Father Stephen Hopkins signed the U.S. Declaration of Independence in 1776. Greenwood has also included a self-portrait at the right showing himself vomiting in the doorway while John Janckes is holding a candle. "The man with his back to the table is Daniel Jenckes." Two sailors are dancing, possibly "Nicholas Power [giving] a dancing lesson to young Godfrey Malbone," while others are sleeping, smoking pipes, or playing cards. Among the white merchants are several dark-skinned servants, possibly slaves, wearing few clothes and carrying drinks in large bowls.

The painting was owned by the Jenckes family in Providence, Rhode Island from the 1750s until the 20th century. It was bought in 1948 by the Saint Louis Art Museum, in St. Louis, Missouri. It is painted in oils on bed ticking and measures 37.75 by 75 inches (95.9 cm × 190.5 cm).
