= The Rights of Colonies Examined =

1764 essay by Stephen Hopkins

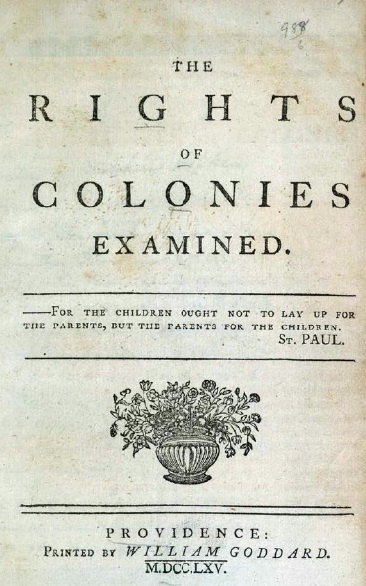
Hopkins' pamphlet was widely circulated in the Thirteen Colonies.

The Rights of Colonies Examined was an influential essay published in 1764 by Founding Father Stephen Hopkins. It set up the argument for colonial opposition to the British Parliament's taxation. Individuals who were taxed without consent were described by Hopkins as: "in the miserable condition of slaves".

The pamphlet received widespread circulation and brought hearty approval throughout the colonies. Historian Thomas Bicknell called it "the most remarkable document that was issued during the period preceding the War of the Revolution." Massachusetts Governor Thomas Hutchinson wrote that "it was conceived in a higher strain than any that were sent out by other colonies." With this pamphlet, Hopkins became to Rhode Island what Samuel Adams was to Massachusetts and what Thomas Jefferson was to Virginia. Hopkins became recognized as one of the leaders of public opinion in the colonies.
