= Coddington Cemetery =

Cemetery in Newport, Rhode Island, US

Coordinates: 41°29′33″N 71°18′52″W

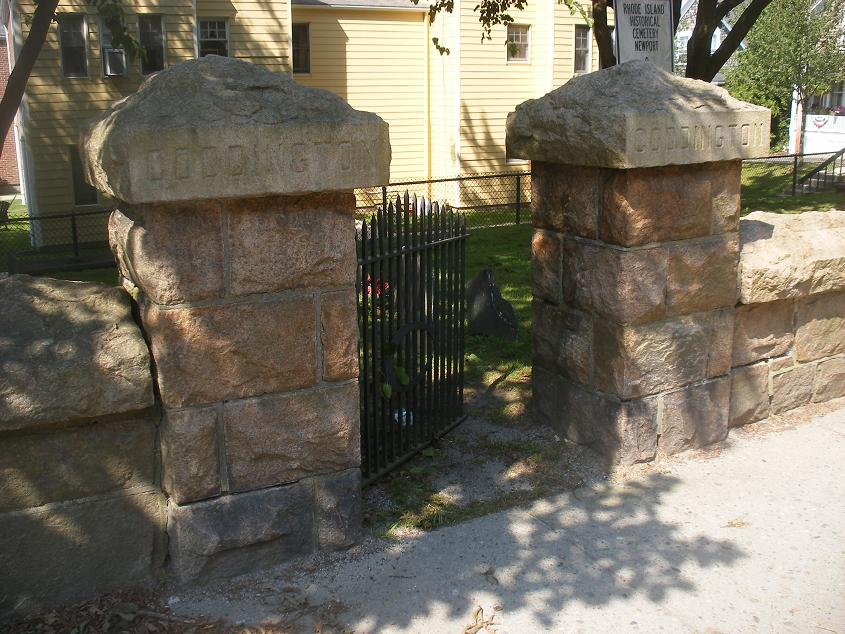
- Entrance from Farewell Street
- Interactive map of Coddington Cemetery

Details
- Established: 1647
- Location: Newport, Rhode Island
- Country: United States
- Type: Denominational (Quaker)
- Owned by: Private
- No. of graves: 93

The Coddington Cemetery is an early colonial cemetery located in Newport, Rhode Island, United States. It is sometimes called the Friends' Burial Ground, and has more colonial governors buried in it than any other cemetery in the state.

== Description ==
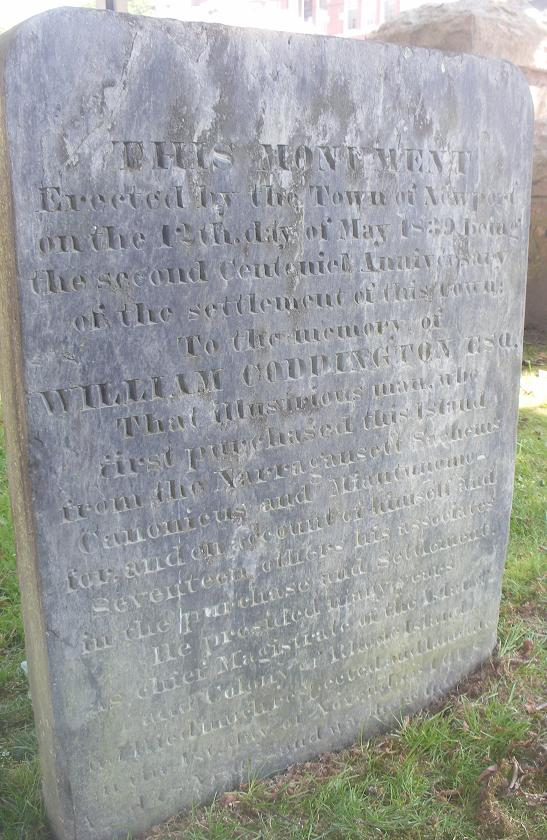
Memorial marker to William Coddington

The Coddington Cemetery at 34 Farewell Street is a very old colonial cemetery with 93 known interments, and has the largest number of interred colonial governors of any cemetery in the state, including William Coddington, Nicholas Easton, William Coddington, Jr., Henry Bull, John Easton, and John Wanton, all Quakers. None of the governor's graves has a governor's medallion like those found at the gravesites of most other colonial governors. The first known interment in this cemetery was that of Mary Moseley Coddington, the wife of Governor William Coddington, who died in 1647, and the last interment was that of James Easton who died in 1796.

The cemetery has been designated as Rhode Island Historic Cemetery, Newport #9, and is located on Farewell Street between Baptist and Coddington Streets in Newport. Within the cemetery is a monument honoring Governor William Coddington, erected on the 200th anniversary of the founding of Newport. The monument reads:

THIS MONUMENT
Erected by the Town of Newport
on the 12th. day of May 1839 being
the second Centeniel Anniversary
of the settlement of this town:

To the memory of
WILLIAM CODDINGTON ESQ
That illustrious man, who
first purchased this Island
from the Narragansett Sachems
Canonicus and Miantunomo
for and on account of himself and
Seventeen others his associates
in the purchase and Settlement.
He presided many years
as chief Magistrate of the Island
and Colony of Rhode Island
and Died much respected and lamented
on the 1st day of November in [1678]
[last line illegible]

== Image gallery ==
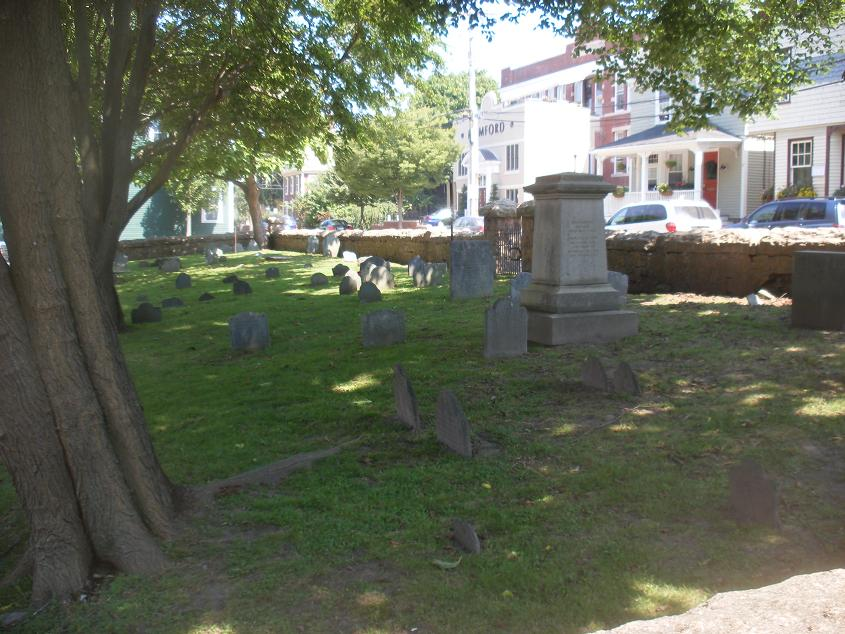
Cemetery, looking north with Farewell Street to right front

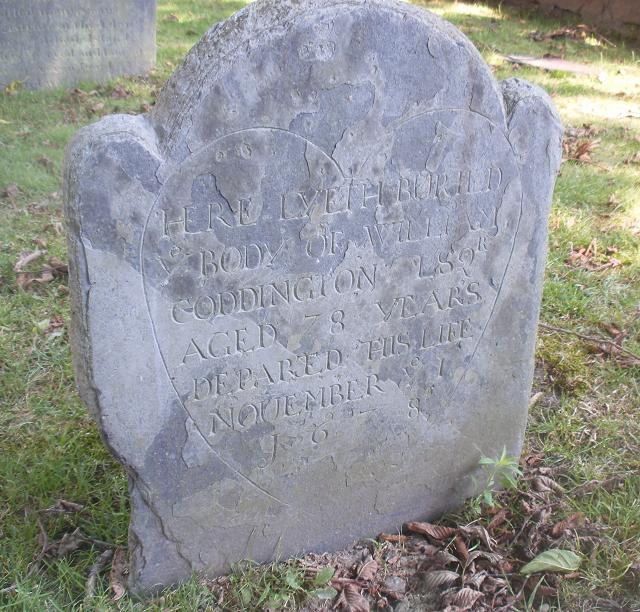
Gov. William Coddington grave marker

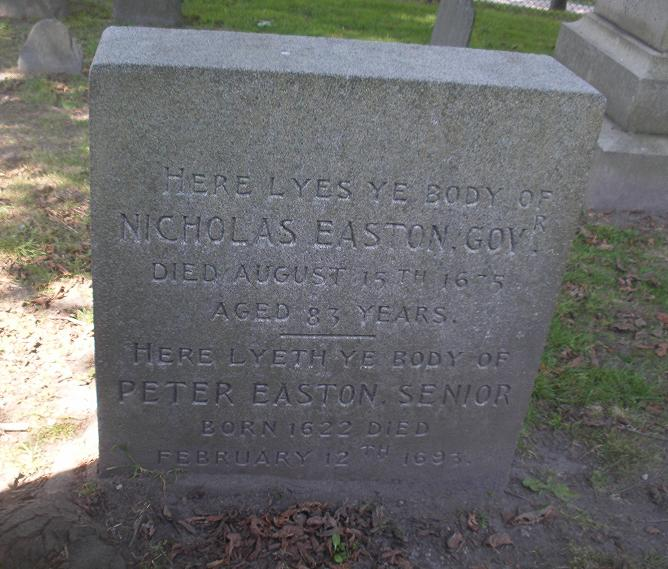
Grave marker for Gov. Nicholas Easton and his son Peter

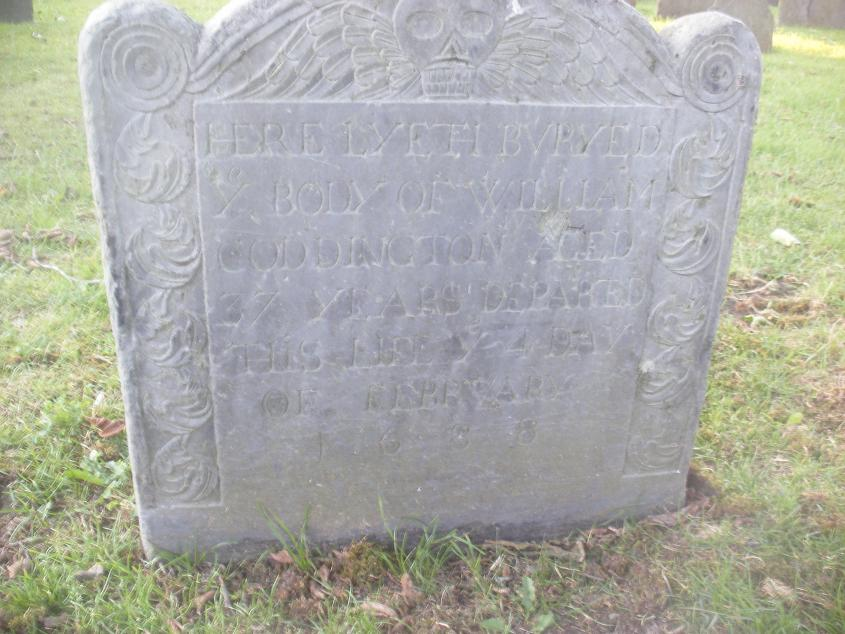
Grave marker for Gov. William Coddington, Jr.

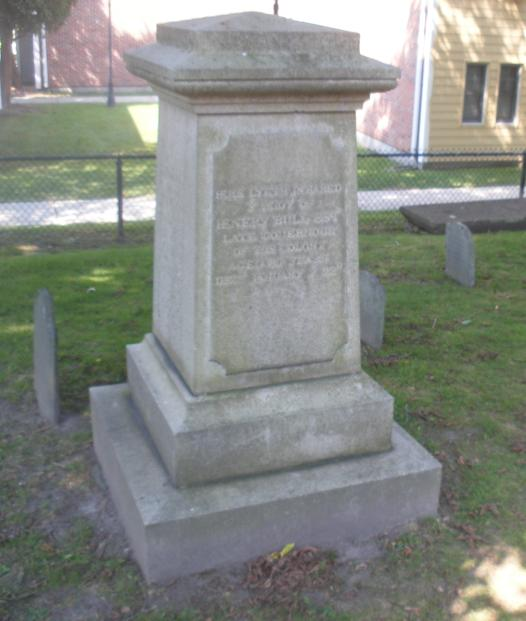
Grave monument for Gov. Henry Bull and his wives

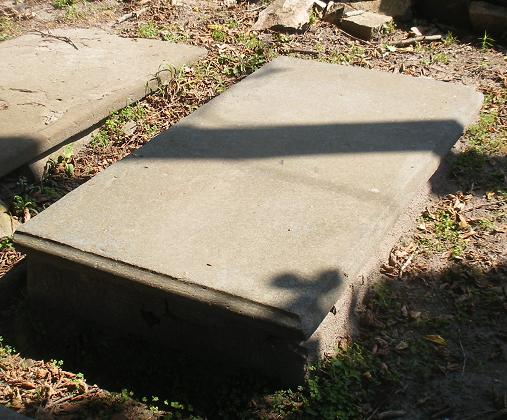
Slab marking grave of Gov. John Easton

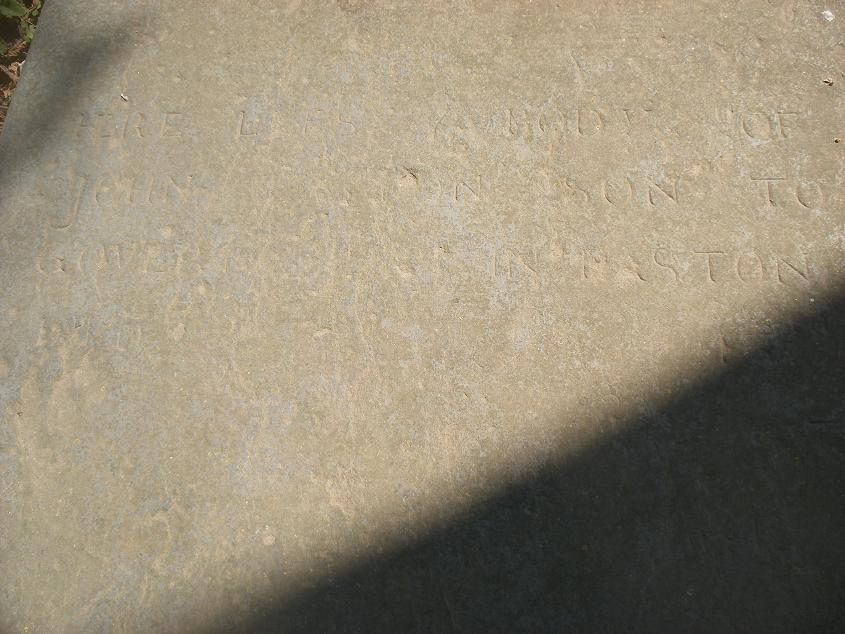
Worn inscription on Gov. John Easton slab

== See also ==
- Category:Burials at Coddington Cemetery
