= Stephen Hopkins (politician) =

American Founding Father and judge (1707–1785)

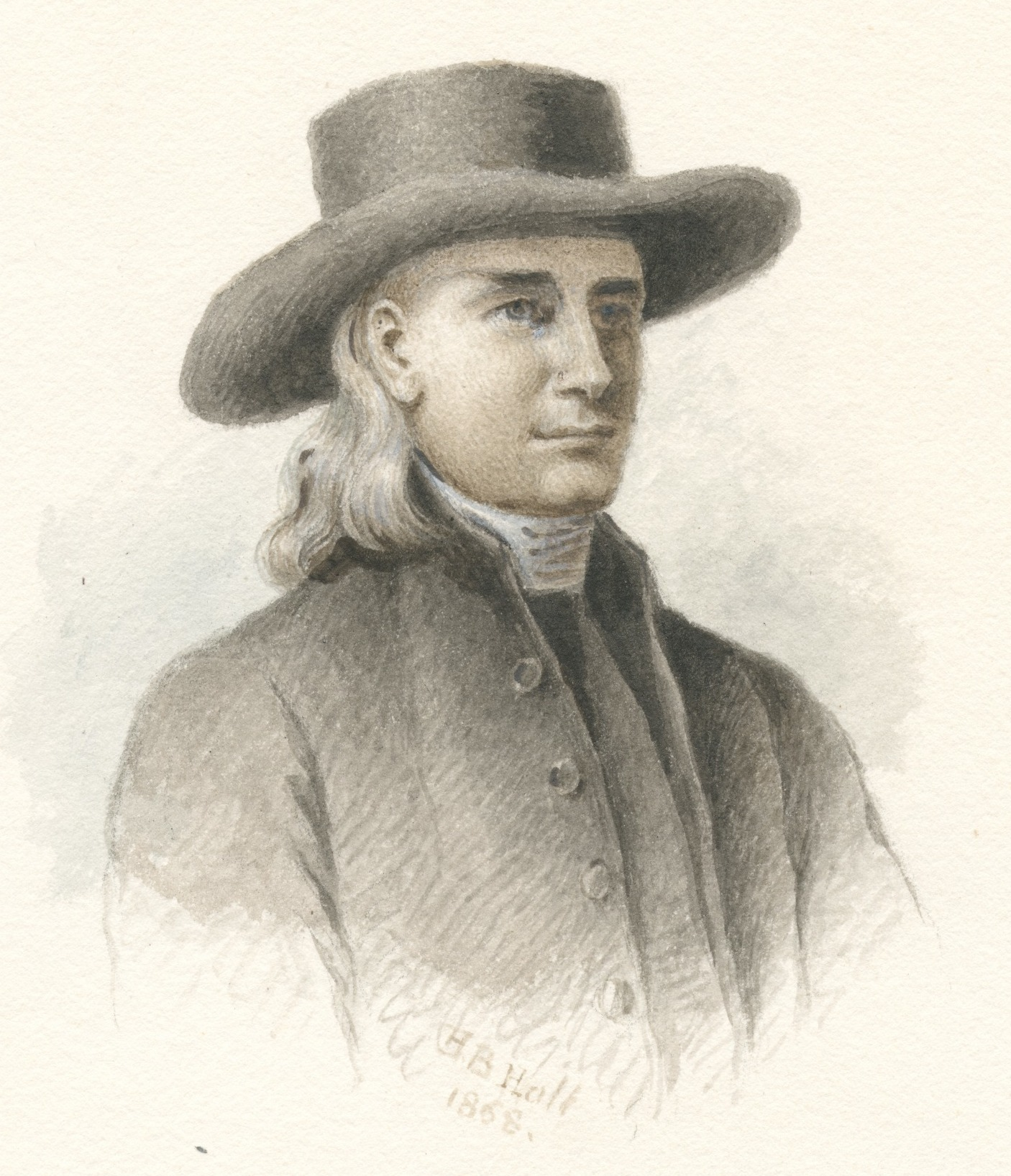

28th, 30th, 32nd, and 34th Governor of the Colony of Rhode Island and Providence Plantations
- In office 1755–1757
- Preceded by: William Greene
- Succeeded by: William Greene
- In office 1758–1762
- Preceded by: William Greene
- Succeeded by: Samuel Ward
- In office 1763–1765
- Preceded by: Samuel Ward
- Succeeded by: Samuel Ward
- In office 1767–1768
- Preceded by: Samuel Ward
- Succeeded by: Josias Lyndon

3rd, 5th, and 17th Chief Justice of the Rhode Island Supreme Court
- In office May 1751 – May 1755
- Preceded by: Joshua Babcock
- Succeeded by: Francis Willet
- In office August 1755 – May 1756
- Preceded by: Francis Willet
- Succeeded by: John Gardner
- In office June 1770 – October 1775
- Preceded by: James Helme
- Succeeded by: John Cooke

Personal details
- Born: March 7, 1707 Providence, Colony of Rhode Island, British America
- Died: July 13, 1785 (aged 78) Providence, State of Rhode Island, U.S.
- Spouse(s): (1) Sarah Scott (2) Anne Smith
- Relations: Martha Hopkins Round (sister); Esek Hopkins, brother
- Occupation: Surveyor, Politician, Chief Justice, Congressional Delegate, Governor
- Known for: signer of the United States Declaration of Independence
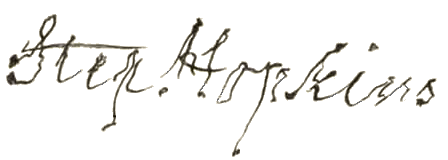
- Signature

Stephen Hopkins (March 7, 1707 – July 13, 1785) was a Founding Father of the United States. He served as governor of the Colony of Rhode Island and Providence Plantations, chief justice of the Rhode Island Supreme Court, and was a signer of both the Continental Association and Declaration of Independence. Hopkins was from a prominent Rhode Island family. His grandfather, William Hopkins, was an influential colonial politician, while his great-grandfather Thomas Hopkins was among the original settlers of Providence Plantations. Thomas sailed from England in 1635 alongside his cousin, Benedict Arnold, who later became the first governor of the Rhode Island colony under the Royal Charter of 1663.

As a child, Hopkins was a voracious reader, becoming a serious student of the sciences, mathematics, and literature. He became a surveyor and astronomer and was involved in taking measurements during the 1769 transit of Venus across the Sun. He began his public service at age 23 as a justice of the peace in the newly established town of Scituate, Rhode Island. He soon became a justice of the Inferior Court of Common Pleas, while also serving at times as the speaker of the House of Deputies and president of the Scituate Town Council. While active in civic affairs, he also was part owner of an iron foundry and was a successful merchant who was portrayed in John Greenwood's 1750s satirical painting Sea Captains Carousing in Surinam. In May 1747, Hopkins was appointed as a justice of the Rhode Island Supreme Court, serving until May 1749. He became the third chief justice of this body in May 1751, serving until May 1755. In 1755, he was elected to his first term as governor of the colony, and he served in this capacity for 9 out of the next 15 years.

One of the most contentious political issues of his day was the use of paper money versus hard currency. His bitter political rival Samuel Ward championed hard currency, whereas Hopkins advocated the use of paper money. The rivalry between the two men became so heated that Hopkins sued Ward for £40,000, but he lost the case and had to pay costs. By the mid-1760s, the contention between the two men became a serious distraction to the government of the colony, and they attempted to placate each other—initially without success. Ultimately, both agreed to not run for office in 1768, and Josias Lyndon was elected governor of the colony as a compromise candidate.

In 1770, Hopkins once again became chief justice of the Rhode Island Supreme Court, and he became a principal player in the colony's handling of the 1772 Gaspee Affair, when a group of irate Rhode Island citizens boarded a British revenue vessel and burned it to the waterline. In 1774, he was given an additional important responsibility as one of Rhode Island's two delegates to the First Continental Congress, his former rival Samuel Ward being the other. Hopkins had become well known in the Thirteen Colonies ten years earlier when he published a pamphlet entitled The Rights of Colonies Examined which was critical of British Parliament and its taxation policies.

Hopkins signed the Declaration of Independence in the summer of 1776 with worsening palsy in his hands. He signed it by holding his right hand with his left and saying, "My hand trembles, but my heart does not." He served in the Continental Congress until September 1776, when failing health forced him to resign. He was a strong backer of the College of the English Colony of Rhode Island and Providence Plantations (later named Brown University) and became the institution's first chancellor. He died in Providence in 1785 at age 78 and is buried in the North Burial Ground there. Hopkins has been called Rhode Island's greatest statesman. In 1774, Hopkins owned six or seven slaves, making him among the top five percent of slaveholders in Providence at the time.

== Ancestry and early life ==
Hopkins was born in Providence in the Colony of Rhode Island and Providence Plantations, the second of nine children of William and Ruth (Wilkinson) Hopkins. His grandfather William Hopkins was very prominent in colonial affairs, having served for more than 40 years as a deputy from Providence, speaker of the House of Deputies, and major. His grandmother Abigail Whipple Hopkins was a daughter of Providence settler John Whipple, sister of wealthy Providence merchant Joseph Whipple, and aunt to Deputy Governor Joseph Whipple Jr. His great-grandfather was Thomas Hopkins, one of the earliest settlers of Providence Plantations. Thomas Hopkins was orphaned and raised by his uncle William Arnold, and he sailed to New England in 1635 with his Arnold relatives, including his cousin Benedict Arnold, who became the first governor of the colony under the Royal Charter of 1663.

The early part of Hopkins's life was spent in the wooded northern part of Providence known as Chopmist Hill, an area that became Scituate, Rhode Island. There were no schools in this area at the time, but the books belonging to the family were supplemented by a small circulating collection and provided him with reading material, which he consumed voraciously. Historian Irving Richman refers to Hopkins as "a close and severe student, filling up all the spare hours of his life with reading." John Sanderson writes, "He attached himself in early youth to the study of books and men." Hopkins gained skills in surveying from his grandfather Samuel Wilkinson. He used his surveying skills to revise the streets and create a map of Scituate, and later he did the same for Providence. His father gave him 70 acres (28 ha) of land when he was 19 because of his responsibility as a youth, and his grandfather Hopkins gave him an additional 90 acres (36 ha).

Hopkins was interested in astronomy and other scientific endeavors, and he was involved in the observation of the transit of Venus across the face of the Sun on June 3, 1769. Joseph Brown had obtained a complete set of the necessary instruments, including a reflecting telescope, a micrometer, and a sextant, and an observatory was erected on a hill in Providence (later named "Transit Street" in honor of the event). Brown was assisted by a group that included Hopkins, Benjamin West, and others who were also interested in science. The observation enabled them to very accurately determine the latitude of Providence to the nearest second of arc, after which the longitude was determined by comparing observations of the Moons of Jupiter with similar observations made in Cambridge, England. He was elected to the revived American Philosophical Society in 1768.

== Political and mercantile pursuits ==
Hopkins began his public service in 1730 at age 23 when he became a justice of the peace in the newly formed town of Scituate, a position that he held until 1735. He also became the clerk of Scituate in 1731 which he held for 11 years until moving to Providence in 1742. Following his tenure as justice of the peace, he became a justice of the Inferior Court of Common Pleas and General Sessions from 1736 to 1746, serving as the clerk of the court for the last five of those years. Other positions that he held during this time period included president of the Town Council, deputy, and speaker of the House of Deputies. In 1744, he was elected as a deputy from Providence, which he held for seven years, and he was the speaker of the House of Deputies during two of those years.

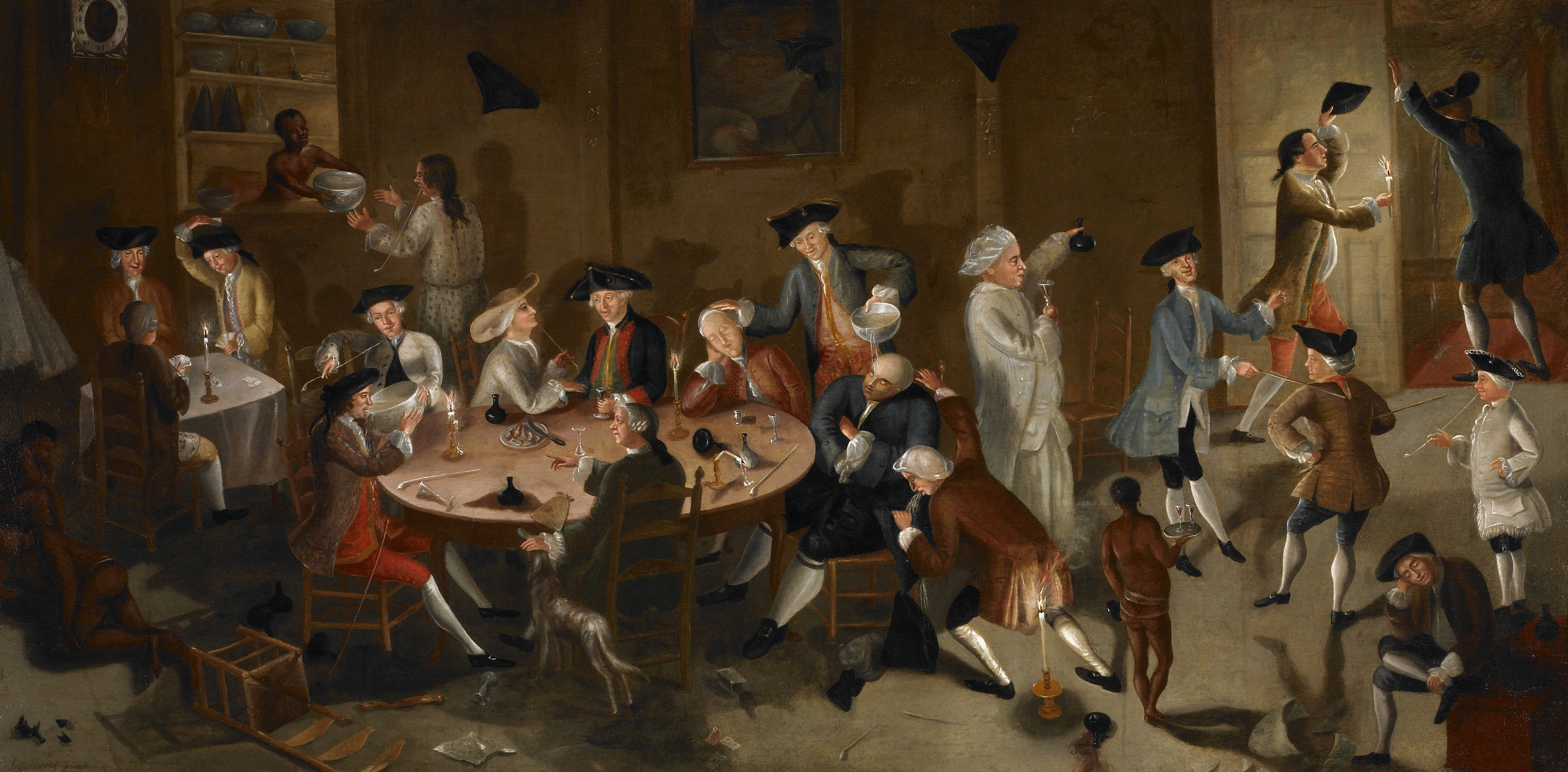
Hopkins (wearing red coat and dozing at the table) in Sea Captains Carousing in Surinam (1755–1758)

In 1742, Hopkins sold his farm in Scituate and moved to the settled part of Providence. Here he devoted much energy to commercial interests which helped Providence grow. He became a merchant who built, owned, and outfitted ships, and he was part owner of the privateering vessel Reprisal in 1745, in partnership with John Mawney, sheriff of Providence and son of Colonel Peter Mawney. In the mid-1750s, Boston portraitist John Greenwood was commissioned by a group of sea captains and merchants, including Hopkins, to create a satirical painting. The men were stopped at a major trading port in Suriname on the north coast of South America where Greenwood was living at the time. Greenwood concocted a 22-figure tavern scene, showing himself among the affluent traders, many of whom were caricatured as intoxicated.

One of Hopkins's enterprises later in life was as a manufacturer, and he became a partner with brothers Moses, Nicholas, Joseph, and John Brown in establishing the Hope Furnace. This enterprise was concerned with iron works which made pig iron and cannons for use during the Revolutionary War. Hopkins's son Rufus managed the business for four decades.

=== Governorships ===
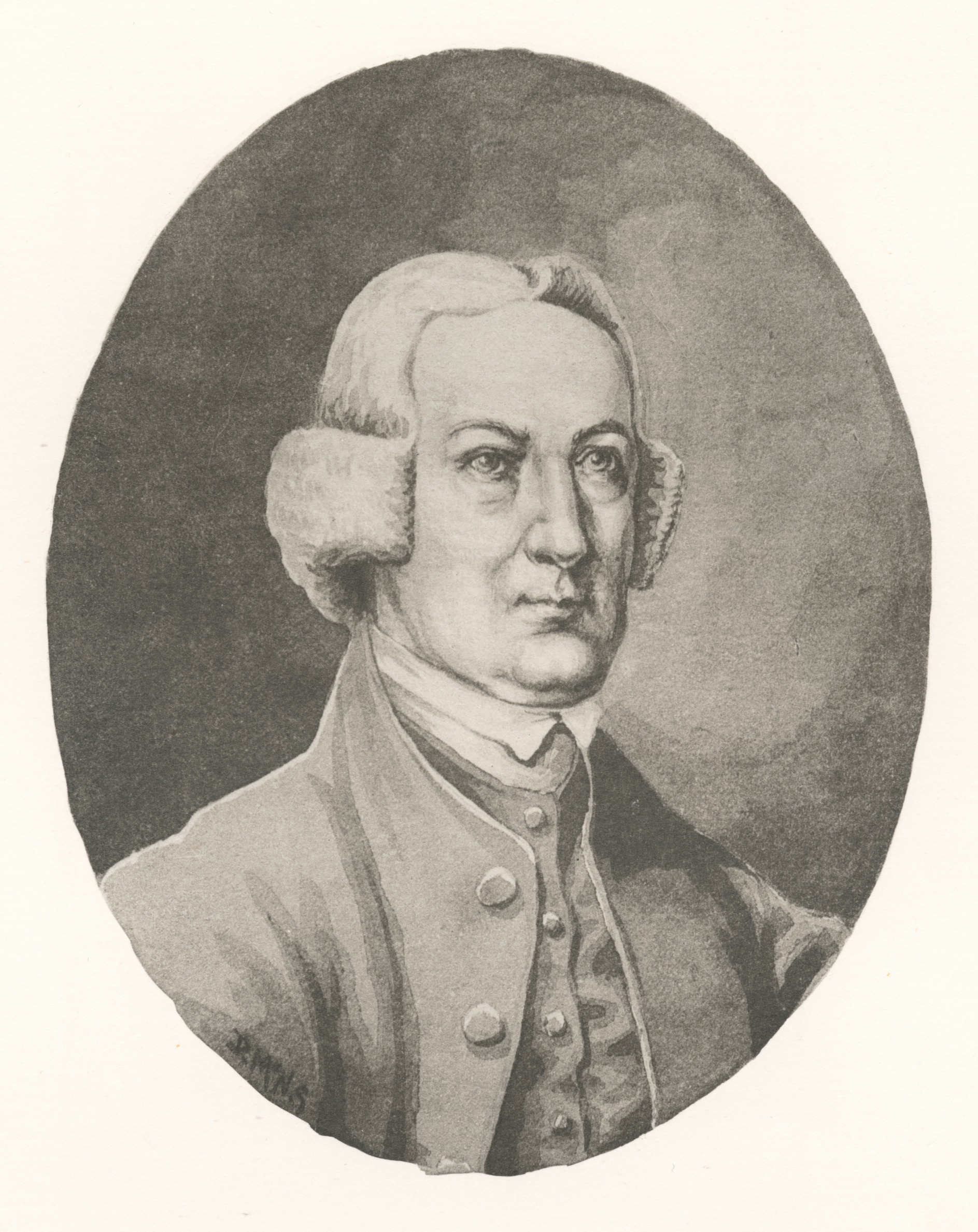
Hopkins's bitter rival Samuel Ward fought with him over the use of paper money.

In 1755, Hopkins was elected to his first term as governor, defeating his predecessor William Greene by a small margin. The year was mostly occupied with legislation and work related to the pending war with France. Braddock's defeat and the occupation of Crown Point led the colony to send forces to Albany. Late in the previous year, Hopkins and his Attorney-General Daniel Updike were delegates from Rhode Island to the Albany Congress, which convened to discuss the common defense of the collective colonies and to hold a conference with the five Indian tribes to secure their assistance in thwarting French encroachment. He and others considered Benjamin Franklin's early plan for uniting the colonies, but the principles of the plan were rejected in both the colonies and Great Britain. As the war with France developed in February 1756, the General Assembly ordered the raising of 500 Rhode Island men for the expedition to Lake George in New York.

After two years in office, Hopkins was defeated by William Greene for the governorship, but Greene died in office in February 1758, and Hopkins once again became governor. The most divisive political issue of the day was the use of hard money, or specie, versus the use of paper money, and Hopkins sided with paper. Another issue was Newport interests versus Providence interests. For several years, Hopkins was locked in a bitter rivalry with Samuel Ward of Westerly, a strong supporter of hard currency and also a champion of Newport, and Hopkins sued Ward for slander, putting damages at £40,000. The case was moved to Massachusetts for a fair trial; the judgment went against Hopkins by default in 1759, and he paid the costs.

For ten years, the two men went back and forth as Governor of the colony, each at the head of a powerful party. Ward led the wealth and conservatism of Newport, Narragansett, and Kent County, while Hopkins represented the growing strength of Providence and Bristol Counties. The two men had been likened to gladiators in an arena, thirsting for each other's life. Hopkins eventually lost to Ward, who was finally elected Governor in 1762.

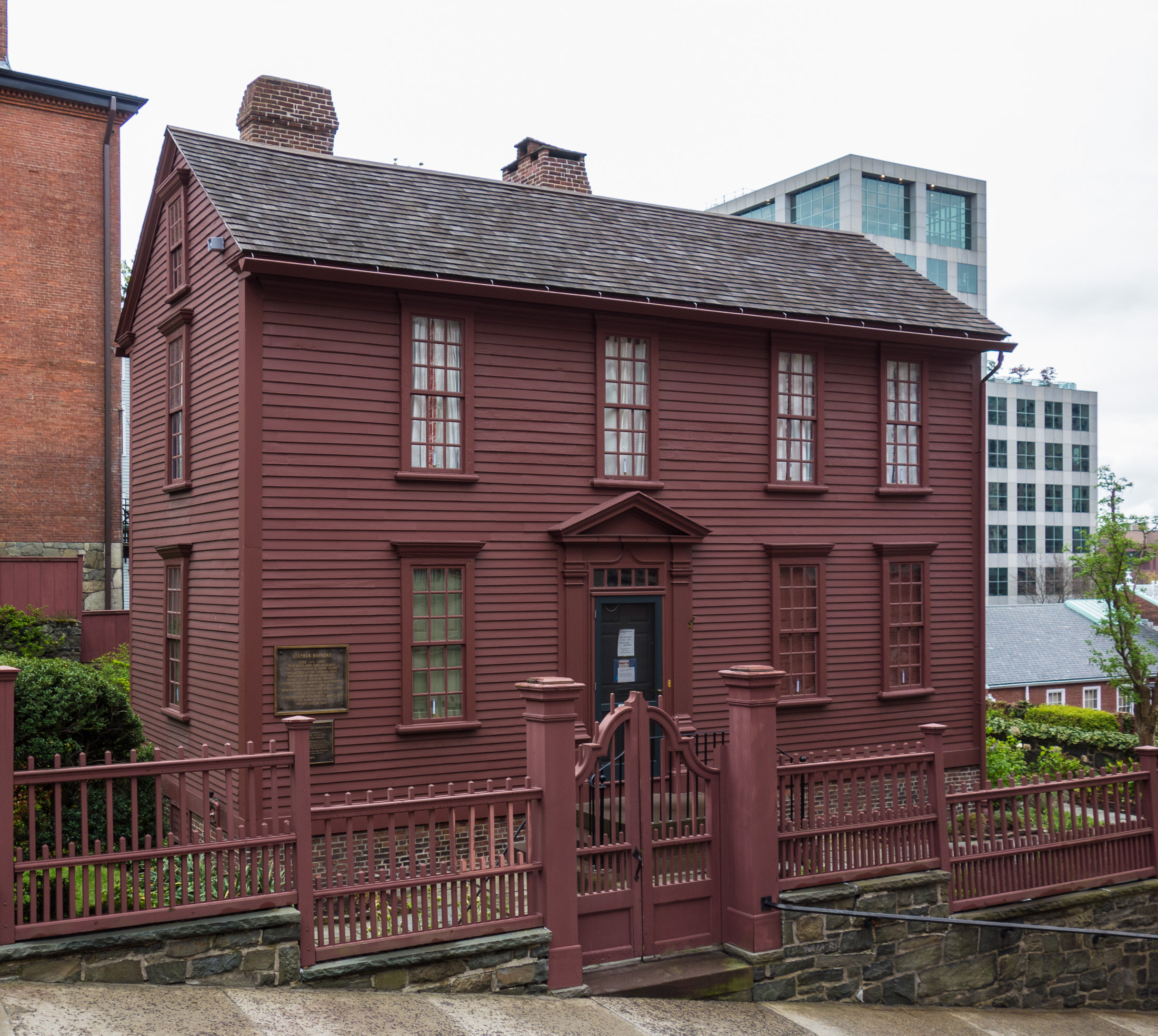
Governor Stephen Hopkins House, 15 Hopkins Street, Providence

In 1763, Hopkins won back the governorship, and signs of reason between the two men appeared the following year when Ward wrote to Hopkins proposing that both resign their "pretensions to the chief seat of government." On the same day, without the knowledge of this letter, Hopkins wrote to Ward inviting him to accept the position of deputy governor, which had just been vacated by the death of John Gardner. Neither man accepted the proposal of the other, but the stage had been set for future cooperation.

In early 1765, the Stamp Act was passed by both houses of Parliament in England. This act was a scheme for taxing the colonies, directing that all commercial and legal documents must be written on stamped paper sold at fixed prices by governmental officers, and also directing that a duty be applied to newspapers. Parliament assumed the right to tax the colonies and put additional duties on sugar, coffee, and other articles, and required that lumber and iron from the colonies only be exported to England.

The news of the act infuriated Americans, and Samuel Adams of Massachusetts invited all the colonies to a congress of delegates to meet in New York to discuss relief from the unjust taxes. The Rhode Island General Assembly passed resolutions in August 1765 following the lead of Patrick Henry of Virginia. Rhode Island's appointed stamp distributor was Attorney General Augustus Johnson, who refused to execute his office "against the will of our Sovereign Lord the People." The Rhode Island General Assembly met again at East Greenwich in September 1765, choosing delegates to the New York congress and appointing a committee to consider the Stamp Act. The committee reported six resolutions that pointed to absolving all allegiance to the British Crown unless the grievances were removed. The Stamp Act was repealed in 1766, with news reaching America in May to public rejoicing.

In 1764, an act was passed incorporating the college in Rhode Island. Ward and Hopkins both strongly supported an institution of higher learning within the colony, and both became trustees of Rhode Island College. Hopkins also became one of the school's most generous supporters and the school's first chancellor, which position he held until his death in 1785.

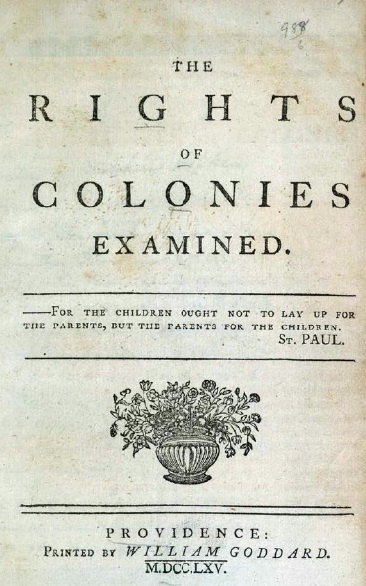
Hopkins's pamphlet was widely circulated in the Thirteen Colonies.

Rhode Island's election of 1767 was as hotly contested as ever, but Hopkins beat Ward by the widest margin of any of their previous elections. In 1768, Hopkins proposed to Ward that the two men should relinquish their claims on the elections and agree to a compromise candidate. Ward accepted the proposal, Josias Lyndon was elected as governor, and Ward and Hopkins met and united in a cordial friendship for the remainder of their lives.

=== The Rights of Colonies Examined ===
In November 1764, the Rhode Island General Assembly published Hopkins's pamphlet The Rights of Colonies Examined. This pamphlet was directed primarily at the Stamp Act and helped build Hopkins's reputation as a revolutionary leader, with its broad distribution and criticism of taxation and Parliament. The text begins, "Liberty is the greatest blessing that men enjoy, and slavery the heaviest curse that human nature is capable of;" it goes on to present a clear and logical review of the relationship of the American colonies with England. The paper received widespread circulation and brought hearty approval from throughout the colonies. Historian Thomas Bicknell called it "the most remarkable document that was issued during the period preceding the War of the Revolution." Massachusetts Governor Thomas Hutchinson wrote of the paper, "it was conceived in a higher strain than any that were sent out by other colonies." It was printed widely, and Hopkins became recognized as one of the leaders of public opinion in the colonies.

=== Chief Justice ===
In May 1747, Hopkins was first appointed as a justice of the Rhode Island Superior Court, whose long title was the "Superior Court of Judicature, Court Of Assize, and General Gaol Delivery." In 1751, he became the third Chief Justice of this court, which he held until 1755 when he became governor. Hopkins was once again appointed as Chief Justice of the court in 1770 after a total of nine years as governor; he served until October 1775 while simultaneously serving as a delegate to the Continental Congress.

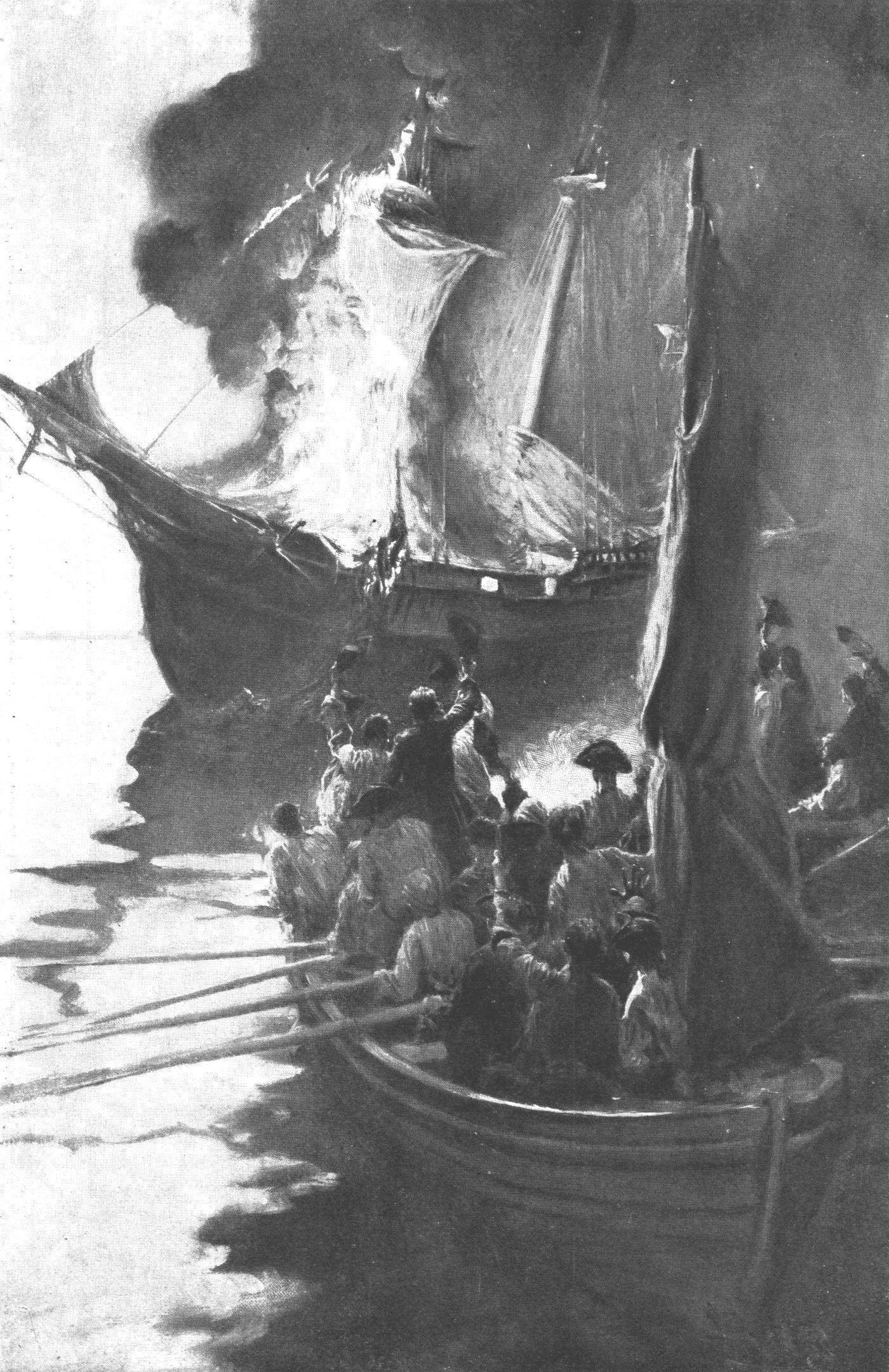
Burning of Gaspée

One of the most important events with which Hopkins dealt during his final tenure as Chief Justice was the Gaspee Affair. In March 1772, Deputy Governor Darius Sessions in Providence sent a letter of concern to Governor Joseph Wanton in Newport, having consulted with Chief Justice Hopkins. Sessions expressed alarm that the British schooner Gaspee had been cruising the Narragansett Bay, disrupting the traffic by stopping and searching commercial ships. Sessions wrote:

I have consulted with the Chief Justice thereon, who is of the opinion that no commander of any vessel has any right to use any authority in the Body of the Colony without previously applying to the Governor and showing his warrant for so doing and also being sworn to a due exercise of his office – and this he informs me has been the common custom in this Colony.

Sessions went on to request that the governor take measures to bring the ship's commander to account. A chain of threatening correspondence ensued between the governor and Gaspee's commander Lieutenant William Dudingston, and Dudingston's superior Admiral John Montagu. On the night of June 9–10, a party of incensed colonists attacked the vessel and burned it to the waterline. Officially, Sessions was outraged at the incident and offered the colony's assistance in bringing the perpetrators to justice. To ameliorate retribution by the British authorities, Rhode Island officials took visible steps to find the culprits who burned the ship. Behind the scenes, however, Sessions and Hopkins did all they could to thwart any attempts to identify the attackers.

A royal commission was appointed by the Crown to investigate the incident, which demanded that any indicted person be sent to London for trial. This prompted the colonists to form the Committees of Correspondence. Loyalist Massachusetts Governor Hutchinson further aggravated the colonists' sensitivities by urging the Crown to rescind the Rhode Island Royal Charter.

Sessions conferred with Chief Justice Hopkins, lawyer John Cole, and Moses Brown, and the four men drafted a letter to Massachusetts' statesman Samuel Adams. Adams replied by urging Rhode Island to remain defiant, or at least to stall matters by appealing the creation of the royal commission. Governor Wanton was put at the head of this commission but was compliant with Sessions' and Hopkins's attempts to frustrate the aims of the commission. Sessions, Hopkins, and others coordinated their efforts to lose evidence, threaten potential witnesses, and discredit those who testified. The vast majority of Rhode Island's citizens were supportive of the attackers and kept quiet about their identities. A year after the incident, the royal commission was terminated without a single indictment.

=== Continental Congress ===
In 1774, the First Continental Congress convened, and both Ward and Hopkins were chosen as the delegates from Rhode Island. Hopkins, at age 68, was senior to every delegate there, and only he and Benjamin Franklin had attended the Albany Congress 20 years earlier. Over the previous several years, Hopkins had developed palsy in his hands, and this greatly affected his ability to write. At the seating of this congress, Henry Arniett Brown wrote, "yonder sits the oldest of them all. His form is bent, his thin locks, fringing a forehead bowed with age and honorable service, and his hands shake tremulously as he folds them in his lap. It is Stephen Hopkins."

The congress was called to protest the actions of Great Britain and to secure the rights and privileges of the 13 colonies. Both Hopkins and Ward had already predicted that independence would only come with war. Hopkins told his associates in Congress, "Powder and ball will decide this question. The gun and bayonet alone will finish the contest in which we are engaged, and any of you who cannot bring your minds to this mode of adjusting the quarrel, had better retire in time."

Declaration of Independence by John Trumbull. Hopkins wears a hat and stands in the back near the door on the left.

Hopkins was again elected as a delegate to the Second Continental Congress which met on May 10, 1775, following the April attacks on Concord and Lexington. This congress convened to manage the war effort, and eventually declared independence from Great Britain. In July 1775, they adopted a national postal system that was devised by William Goddard, with Benjamin Franklin appointed as the first Postmaster General. This was an idea that had already been implemented in Rhode Island a month earlier. In December 1775, Hopkins was on a committee to report a plan for furnishing the colonies with naval armament. His knowledge of the shipping business made him particularly useful as a member of the naval committee established by Congress to purchase, outfit, man, and operate the first ships of the new Continental Navy. Hopkins was instrumental in framing naval legislation and drafting the rules and regulations necessary to govern the fledgling organization during the American War for Independence. The first American naval squadron was launched on February 18, 1776. Hopkins used his influence to secure the position of commander in chief of the new navy for his brother Esek Hopkins, an appointment that proved to be unfortunate.

The Colony of Rhode Island and Providence Plantations declared its absolute independence from Great Britain by a nearly unanimous vote on May 4, 1776; the Continental Congress adopted the United States Declaration of Independence two months later on July 2. Hopkins had to support his palsied right hand with his left as he signed the document, remarking, "my hand trembles, but my heart does not." The gathering of the Founding Fathers was depicted in John Trumbull's Declaration of Independence, where Hopkins is pictured standing in the back wearing a hat.

John Adams appreciated Hopkins's contributions during the congressional sessions:

Governor Hopkins of Rhode Island, above seventy Years of Age kept us all alive. Upon Business his Experience and judgment were very Useful. But when the Business of the Evening was over, he kept Us in Conversation till Eleven and sometimes twelve O Clock. His Custom was to drink nothing all day nor till Eight O Clock, in the Evening, and then his Beveredge was Jamaica Spirit and Water. It gave him Wit, Humour, Anecdotes, Science and Learning. He had read Greek, Roman and British History: and was familiar with English Poetry particularly Pope, Tompson and Milton. And the flow of his Soul made all his reading our own, and seemed to bring to recollection in all of Us all We had ever read. I could neither eat nor drink in those days. The other Gentlemen were very temperate. Hopkins never drank to excess, but all he drank was immediately not only converted into Wit, Sense, Knowledge and good humour, but inspired Us all with similar qualities.

== Hopkins and slavery ==
Stephen Hopkins was a slave owner, like the majority of the signers of the Declaration of Independence, and he mentioned five slaves in his 1760 will consisting of a man, woman, and three boys. They were bequeathed to close members of his family with instructions for their care; this was highly unusual for any slave owner. The woman was named Fibbo (or Phibo, Phebe) and was to go to his wife Anne and be treated "so that Servitude may not be a Burthen to her"; the man was named Saint Jago and was to go to his oldest son Rufus and be treated "so that his Life may be rendered easy and comfortable." The will was never proved because Hopkins lived another 25 years, and circumstances changed its provisions.

On October 28, 1772, Hopkins freed Saint Jago and wrote the following in the manumission document:

But, principally, and most of all finding that the merciful and beneficent goodness of Almighty God; by the blessed Gospel of Jesus Christ our Lord: hath by the blessed Spirit taught all, who honestly obey its Divine Dictates, that, the keeping any of his rational Creatures in Bondage, who are capable of taking care of, and providing for themselves in a State of Freedom: is, altogather inconsistent with his Holy and Righteous Will.

Hopkins felt that the bondage of self-sufficient "rational creatures" was against God's will; he also thought that unconditional freedom for some slaves would be irresponsible on his part. To this end, he refused to free his woman slave Fibbo, even though it cost him his membership in the Quaker meeting. His rationale was that "she had Children that needed the Immediate Care of a Mother." It appears that Hopkins's remaining slaves were not freed until after his death, but at least two of them (Primus and Bonner Jr.) had been living semi-independently for several years before his death.

Hopkins introduced a bill in 1774 while serving in the Rhode Island Assembly which prohibited the importation of slaves into the colony. This became one of the first anti-slave trade laws in the United States. There were several pressures occurring in the colony which led to greater restrictions on the slave trade, the greatest of which was the pressure applied by the Quakers, who were a large percentage of Rhode Island's population.

== Death and legacy ==
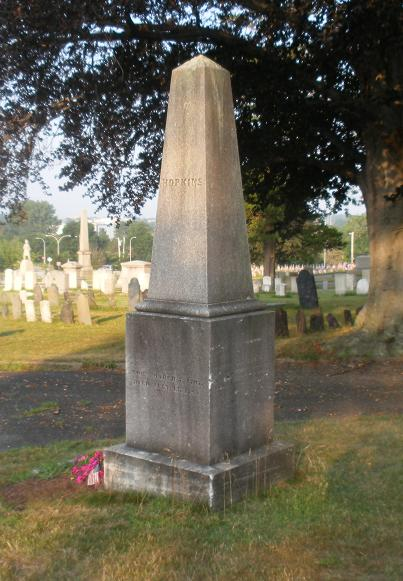
Hopkins grave marker, North Burial Ground, Providence

In September 1776, poor health forced Hopkins to resign from the Continental Congress and return to his home in Rhode Island, though he remained an active member of Rhode Island's general assembly from 1777 to 1779. He died at his home in Providence on July 13, 1785, at age 78, and he is buried in the North Burial Ground there.

Hopkins helped to found the Providence Library Company in 1753, and he was a member of the Philosophical Society of Newport. The town of Hopkinton, Rhode Island was named after him. The SS Stephen Hopkins is a liberty ship named in his honor, and it was the first U.S. ship to sink a German surface warship in World War II.

Hopkins was instrumental in the establishment of the College in the English Colony of Rhode Island and Providence Plantations (now Brown University) as a founding trustee. He served as Brown's first chancellor from 1764 to 1785. His home was originally located at the corner of Hopkins and South Main Streets in Providence, but it was moved twice after his death, both times to other locations on Hopkins Street. It is now located at 15 Hopkins Street, at the corner of Benefit Street, on the edge of the Brown University campus, and is a National Historic Landmark.

In his diary, the Reverend Ezra Stiles wrote of Hopkins, "I well knew Gov. Hopkins. He was a man of penetrating astutious Genius, full of Subtlety, deep Cunning, intriguing & enterprizing." Stiles added that Hopkins was a "man of a Noble fortitude & resolution" and "a glorious Patriot!" Hopkins has been given strong accolades from numerous historians, including Sanderson, Arnold, and Bicknell, but Richman simply called him "the greatest statesman of Rhode Island."

== Family ==
Hopkins married Sarah Scott in 1726, the daughter of Sylvanus Scott and Joanna Jenckes and a descendant of Providence Plantations settlers Richard Scott and Katharine Marbury; Marbury was the youngest sister of Anne Hutchinson. Richard Scott was the first Quaker in Providence.

Hopkins had seven children, five of whom lived to maturity. His wife died on September 9, 1753, at age 46, and Hopkins married Anne Smith, the daughter of Benjamin Smith. They did not have children together. Hopkins's younger brother Esek Hopkins became the first commander in chief of the Continental Navy, and his brother William became a celebrated merchant. Hopkins's cousin was Quaker preacher Jemima Wilkinson, with whom he was friends.

== See also ==
- List of colonial governors of Rhode Island
- List of chief justices of the Rhode Island Supreme Court
- List of Brown University people
- Colony of Rhode Island and Providence Plantations
- Memorial to the 56 Signers of the Declaration of Independence
