= Josias Lyndon =

Rhode Island colonial governor (1704–1778)

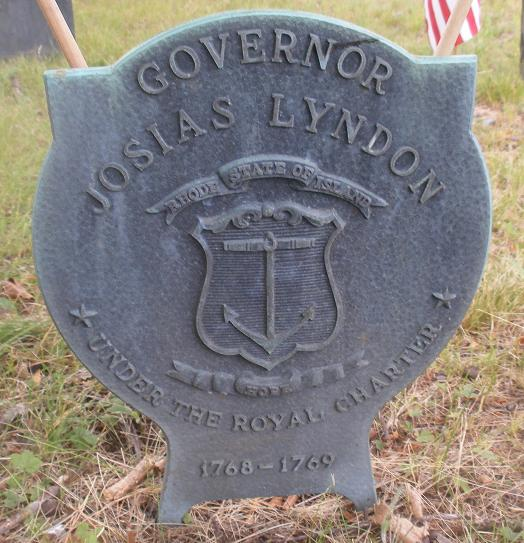
- Josias Lyndon grave medallion

35th Governor of the Colony of Rhode Island and Providence Plantations
- In office 1768–1769
- Preceded by: Stephen Hopkins
- Succeeded by: Joseph Wanton

Personal details
- Born: March 10, 1704 Newport, Colony of Rhode Island, British America
- Died: March 30, 1778 (aged 74) Warren, Rhode Island, U.S.
- Resting place: Kickemuit Cemetery; Warren, Rhode Island, U.S.
- Spouse: Mary Carr (m. 1727)
- Occupation: Scrivener, Clerk of Assembly, governor

Josias Lyndon (March 10, 1704 – March 30, 1778) was a governor of the Colony of Rhode Island and Providence Plantations, serving for a single one-year term.

== Biography ==
Lyndon was the son of Samuel and Priscilla (Tompkins) Lyndon of Newport, the grandson of Josias Lyndon of Newport, and the great grandson of Augustin Lyndon, a shipwright in Boston in the Massachusetts Bay Colony. Lyndon married in 1727 Mary Carr, the daughter of Edward and Hannah (Stanton) Carr, and granddaughter of Governor Caleb Carr. The couple had no children.

In 1728 Lyndon was made a freeman of Newport, and having been educated in the Newport Grammar School, he became a scrivener (scribe) and went to work the same year as the Clerk of the Assembly, which he continued uninterrupted for nearly four decades until 1767. He was charter member of the Artillery Company of Newport, serving as the company's clerk from 1741 to 1747 and as first lieutenant from 1752 to 1755.

After serving a term as governor from 1768 to 1769, he resumed his position as Clerk of the Assembly from 1770 until 1777, just before his death. As the recorder of colonial affairs, he became familiar with virtually every piece of legislation and every official manuscript written over a period of nearly half a century. At the time of Lyndon's election to governor in 1768, there was a lot of bitter acrimony between one camp led by Samuel Ward and the other camp led by Stephen Hopkins, both of whom had already served multiple terms as governor. Lyndon was elected almost unanimously as a peace and compromise candidate.

Most of Lyndon's year as governor was spent in correspondence with a representative of the King of England, expressing concerns of the colony over the unjust taxation brought about by the Stamp Act. Fifteen letters from the Colonial Secretary, Hillsborough, in London, and as many replies by Lyndon concerning the constitutional rights of the colony were the main business of this administration. The only act of importance during Lyndon's term was the valuation of the Rhode Island colony, an amount that came to a little more than two million pounds.

When war with Britain came to the colonies and Newport was occupied, Lyndon found safety in Warren, Rhode Island where he died of smallpox in 1778. He was buried in a cemetery on Serpentine Road, along the bank of the Kickemuit River in Warren.

=== Caesar Lyndon ===
Caesar Lyndon was a highly articulate and literate African man enslaved by Josiah Lyndon. Caesar carried out Lyndon's business, acting as both a purchasing agent and a secretary. His Sundry Account Book chronicles his financial transactions from Newport's famed slave traders as well as free and enslaved people. By way of double-entry bookkeeping, Caesar itemized the sale and acquisition of goods and services. He also noted deaths, marriages, and a pig roast. This nearly thirty-five page book represents a lesser-known example of the early African American literary tradition of the United States.

He was also a Secretary of the Free African Union Society, the first Black benevolent society in the United States. With money he managed to earn on the side, he bought good clothes and belt buckles, and managed to fund weekend getaways for himself. In the summer 1766, Caesar and several friends went on a "pleasant outing" to Portsmouth. He provided a large feast for his guests of pig roast, corn, bread, wine, rum, coffee and butter. Two months later, Caesar married his picnic companion, Sarah Searing.

== See also ==
- List of colonial governors of Rhode Island
- Colony of Rhode Island and Providence Plantations
