= Mary Watt =

New Zealand landscape architect (1917–2005)

- Born: Muriel Mary Lysaght; 27 March 1917
- Died: 2 July 2005 (aged 88); Wellington, New Zealand
- Occupations: Landscape architect; gardener
- Spouse: John Harold Watt (m. 1953)
- Relatives: Averil Lysaght (sister); Jane Stowe (grandmother); Leonard Stowe (grandfather); John Lysaght Moore (cousin); Sophia Augusta Lysaght (aunt); Ellen Greenwood (great-aunt); Sarah Greenwood (great-grandmother); John Danforth Greenwood (great-grandfather)

Muriel Mary Watt (née Lysaght; 27 March 1917 – 2 July 2005) was a New Zealand landscape architect and gardener.

== Biography ==
Watt was born Muriel Mary Lysaght on 27 March 1917, the daughter of Emily Muriel Lysaght (née Stowe) and Brian Cuthbert Lysaght, and spent her childhood in Mokoia, Taranaki. Her sister was scientist Averil Lysaght. Her maternal grandparents were Jane Stowe and Leonard Stowe. Her cousin was the artist John Lysaght Moore.

Lysaght began her career as a gardener at the Dunedin Botanic Gardens in 1936. In 1946, she enrolled to study at the New Zealand Institute of Horticulture, completing a three-year course. In 1950 and 1951, she studied at the Royal College of Art in London, in the School of Architecture. It is likely that she was New Zealand's first woman landscape architect, and when she qualified was perhaps the only New Zealander to be a member of the Institute of Landscape Architects (UK). Lysaght started her own landscape architecture business in Wellington in 1951. Her most notable work was the garden for Shirley Smith and Bill Sutch for their house in Brooklyn, Wellington.

In 1953, Lysaght married John Harold Watt, a scientist who rose to become assistant director of the horticulture division of the Ministry of Agriculture and Fisheries. The couple lived in Brooklyn, Wellington, for most of their married life. Mary Watt died in Wellington on 2 July 2005, and was buried in Hāwera Cemetery. Her husband died the following year.
