= Benjamin Truman =

English entrepreneur and brewer

Sir Benjamin Truman
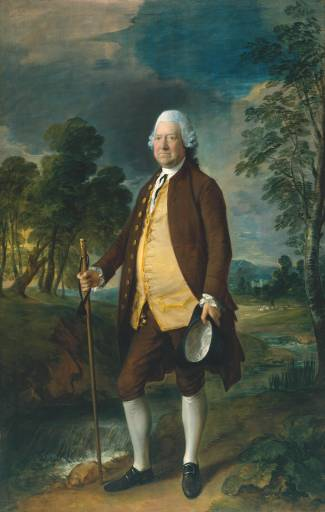
- Portrait of Truman by Thomas Gainsborough
- Born: 1699/1700
- Died: 20 March 1780
- Occupations: Businessman, brewer
- Known for: expansion of the Truman Brewery
- Spouse: Frances Truman
- Children: 1
- Relatives: James Winstanley (father-in-law); Sophia Augusta Moore (descendant)

Sir Benjamin Truman (1699/1700 – 20 March 1780) was an English entrepreneur and brewer during the 18th century, responsible for the expansion of the Truman Brewery in the Brick Lane area of east London.

== Biography ==
Truman followed in the footsteps of his father and elder brother, both named Joseph Truman. Joseph Truman the elder inherited the Lolsworth Field brewery, William Bucknall's Brewhouse, in 1694, and took his son Joseph into partnership in 1716 before dying in 1719. Benjamin Truman joined the firm in 1722 and within a few years control of Truman's passed to him. Benjamin Truman proved himself a shrewd businessman:

"On the birth of the Duchess of Brunswick, granddaughter of George II, in August 1737, the Prince of Wales ordered four loads of faggots and a number of tar barrels to be burnt before Carlton House to celebrate the event, and directed the brewer of his household to place four barrels of beer near the bonfire for the use of those who chose to partake of the beverage. The beer proved to be of inferior quality and the people threw it into each other's faces and the barrels into the fire. The prince remedied the matter on the following night by ordering a fresh quantity of beer from another brewer. This was supplied by Truman, who took care that it should be of the best, thus earning for himself considerable popularity".

Under Truman's management, the Black Eagle brewery increased substantially in prosperity and size, and Truman divided his time between the brewery's Directors' House and a home, Popes, in Hertfordshire.

Truman was knighted by George III on his accession in 1760 in recognition of his loyalty in contributing to the voluntary loans raised to carry on the various foreign wars. His portrait was painted by George Romney and Thomas Gainsborough (c. 1773–1774); the latter has been part of the Tate Gallery collection since 1978.

Truman died on 20 March 1780, and left a daughter Frances (married to Henry Read), his only child. Her sons, William Truman Read and General Henry Read (Sir Benjamin's grandsons), became involved in the business. Sir Benjamin's great-grandchildren, John Freeman Villebois and Henry Villebois, later succeeded to his interest in the business.

Truman was buried in the churchyard of St Mary's, Hertingfordbury, Hertfordshire. Together with his memorial is that of his wife Frances Truman who died 10 June 1766 aged 66 and James Truman Esq., died 11 November 1766 aged 42. His wife was the daughter of James Winstanley. New Zealand artist Sophia Augusta Moore was his descendant. Her son was the artist John Lysaght Moore.

== Trivia ==
Truman's image was used on beer labels and in advertising until the 1970s, depicting him as a jolly fat man with a peg leg and the motto "There’s more hops in Ben Truman".
