= Mrs. Humphrey Devereux =

1771 painting by John Singleton Copley

Mrs Humphrey Devereux
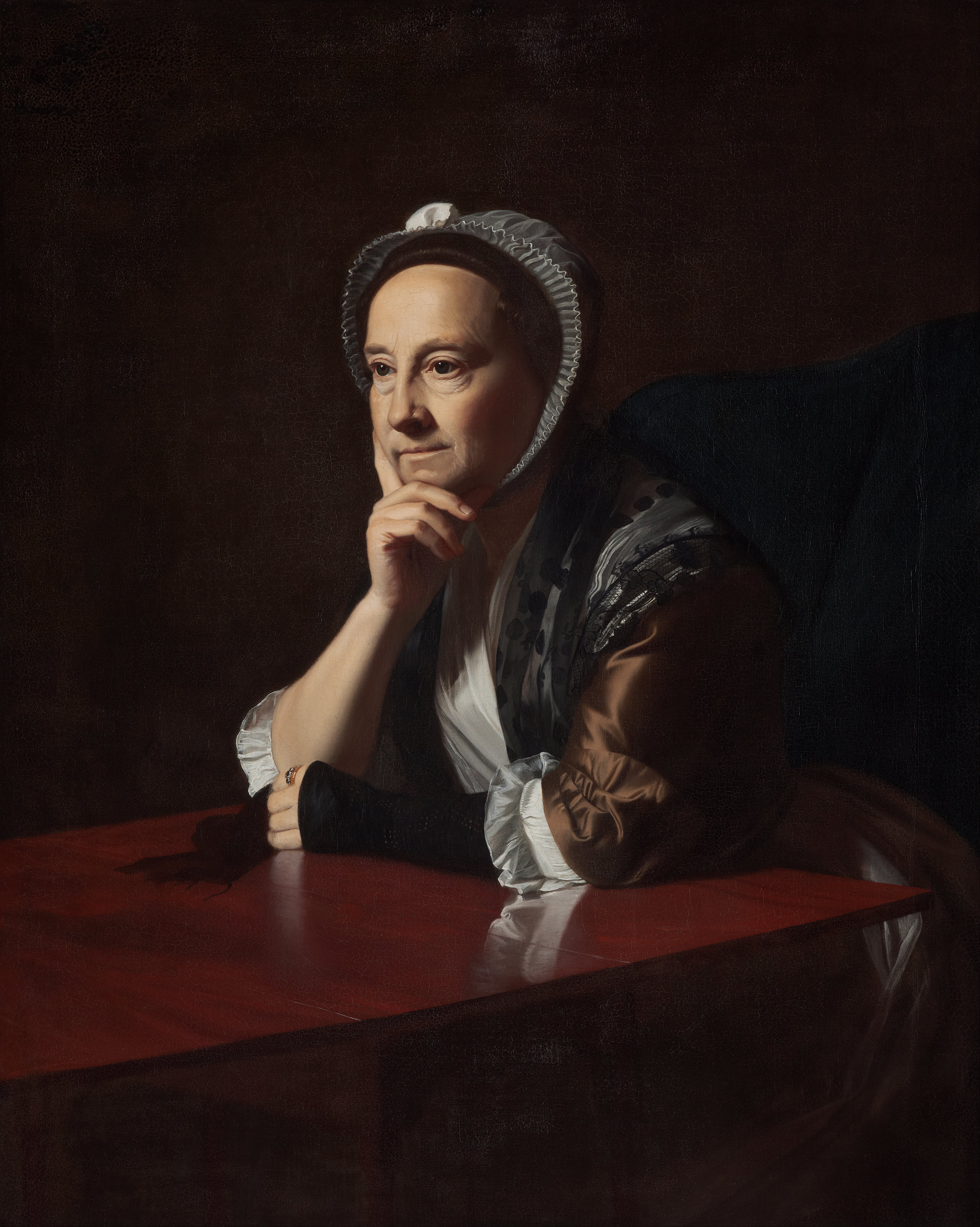
- Artist: John Singleton Copley
- Year: 1771
- Medium: Oil on canvas
- Subject: Mary (Charnock) Greenwood Devereux (1710-1794)
- Dimensions: 103 cm × 81.3 cm (41 in × 32.0 in)
- Location: Museum of New Zealand Te Papa Tongarewa, Wellington, New Zealand

Mrs Humphrey Devereux is a 1771 oil painting on canvas by the Anglo-American painter John Singleton Copley. It is part of the international painting collection of the Museum of New Zealand Te Papa Tongarewa.

== History ==
John Greenwood commissioned the portrait of his mother on the occasion of her sixtieth birthday. It came to New Zealand in 1843 with John Danforth Greenwood. The painting underwent restoration for the exhibition Angels & Aristocrats in 2012. In 2018 the painting went on long-term display in Te Papa's Tūrangawaewae: Art and New Zealand exhibition.
