= Leonard Greenwood =

Leonard Greenwood may refer to:

- Leonard Greenwood (classicist) (1880–1965), New Zealander classical scholar
- Leonard Greenwood (cricketer) (1899–1982), English cricketer and schoolteacher
