= Averil Lysaght =

New Zealand biologist, science historian, and illustrator (1905–1981)

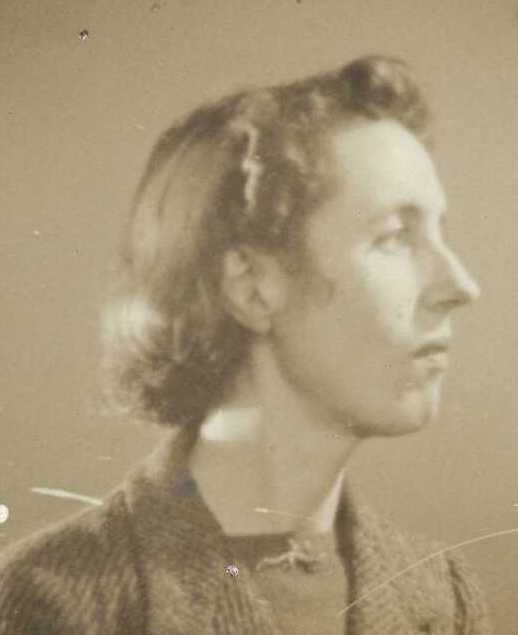
- Born: Averil Margaret Lysaght; 14 April 1905; Mokoia, New Zealand
- Died: 21 August 1981 (aged 76); London, England
- Education: Victoria University College
- Relatives: Mary Watt (sister); Jane Stowe (grandmother); Leonard Stowe (grandfather); John Lysaght Moore (cousin); Sophia Augusta Lysaght (aunt); Ellen Greenwood (great-aunt); Sarah Greenwood (great-grandmother); John Danforth Greenwood (great-grandfather)
- Scientific career
- Fields: Entomology; History of science

Averil Margaret Lysaght (14 April 1905 – 21 August 1981) was a New Zealand biologist, science historian and artist, best known for her scholarly work on Joseph Banks.

== Early life ==
Lysaght was born in Mokoia, Taranaki, New Zealand on 14 April 1905 to Emily Muriel Lysaght (née Stowe) and Brian Cuthbert Lysaght. Her maternal grandparents were Jane Stowe and Leonard Stowe. When she was 15 she discovered on Mount Taranaki an owlet moth previously unknown to science. That species was described in 1921 by entomologist G. V. Hudson and named Graphania averilla in her honour.

== Education ==
Lysaght was initially educated at home by a governess, but was sent to Chilton House Private Girls' Boarding School in Wellington when she was 12. In 1923, Lysaght began studying for a degree at Victoria University College, Wellington. While attending university, Lysaght joined the Victoria University tramping club and went on tramps with John Beaglehole, with whom she later collaborated on scholarly works. While studying for her bachelor's degree, Lysaght published her first papers on entomology. She graduated with a Bachelor of Science degree in 1928 and obtained a master's degree in science in 1929. Her thesis was on the biology of Eucolaspis, a genus of beetle. From 1927 to 1929, she was on the staff of the Cawthron Institute's department of entomology and from 1931 to 1932 she was employed by Victoria University College as a temporary assistant in zoology.

Subsequently, Lysaght moved to England to live and continued her education. Lysaght spent three years undertaking postgraduate research at the Rothamsted Experimental Station in London, after which she was awarded a doctorate from the University of London in 1935. Her doctoral thesis was on the nematode parasites of thrips.

During this time, Lysaght undertook artistic training first at the Nottingham School of Art and later at St Martin's School of Art in London.

== Work ==
From 1935 to 1938 Lysaght was employed at the Plymouth laboratory of the Marine Biological Association of the United Kingdom. She also worked at the Imperial Institute of Entomology. Between 1936 and 1943 she published five papers in parasitology, including two papers on trematode parasites of gastropods. Lysaght subsequently obtained employment as an assistant editor of the zoology section of Chambers Encyclopaedia. During her time there, either in 1947 or 1948 she met Norman Boyd Kinnear, Keeper of Zoology at the British Museum of Natural History. It was Kinnear who suggested she research the birds of Cook's voyages. He assisted her in this endeavour by providing space for her to work at the British Museum of Natural History. Lysaght proceeded to catalogue all the bird paintings executed on all Cook's voyages. She also did in depth research on the museums' collection of Sydney Parkinson's paintings and drawings and continued to work at this project for over twenty years. As a result of her research she did much to help identify drawings by Herman Spöring, Bank's assistant. This culminated in her publishing in 1975 The book of birds: five centuries of bird illustration.

During this time Lysaght also edited the zoological material for the Hakluyt Society's edition of Cook's first two voyages. She also provided John Cawte Beaglehole with much of the zoological and botanical notes for his books on James Cook's three voyages. In 1957, Lysaght published an article examining the mystery of the identity of "Cook's Kangaroo", the first kangaroo brought to England, and the subject of a recently rediscovered painting by George Stubbs.

== Painting ==
'Lysaght was a talented artist, a gift that apparently first developed at Nottingham and later at Saint Martin's School of Art in London.' A solo exhibition of her work was held at the Leicester Galleries, in October 1961. Most of her water-colour paintings were on 'Siamese paper made from the fibres of the daphne bush'. Lysaght's October 1961 show of water-colours (no. 1222) coincided with ones the Leicester Galleries held for Kyffin Williams (no. 1223) and Anne Madden (no. 1221), whose work was influenced by Sam Francis, Jean-Paul Riopelle, and by her husband Louis le Brocquy, as too it seems was Lysaght's, notably Riopelle.

== Death ==
Lysaght died on the 21 August 1981 in London.

== Specimens collected ==
- Porina oreas
- Leuconopsis obsoleta
- Pisidium novaezelandiae
- Potamopyrgus antipodarum

== Published works ==
- The Book of Birds - Five Centuries of Bird Illustration
- Joseph Banks in Newfoundland and Labrador 1776

== Recognition and awards ==
The moth species Graphania averilla was named in her honour. Lysaght was awarded an honorary Degree in Literature from the Memorial University of Newfoundland in recognition of her book Joseph Banks in Newfoundland and Labrador 1776. In 2017, Lysaght was selected as one of the Royal Society Te Apārangi's "150 women in 150 words", celebrating the contributions of women to knowledge in New Zealand.
