= William Stowe =

William Stowe is the name of:

- William Stowe (rower) (1940–2016), member of the 1964 Olympic gold medal eights crew
- William Henry Stowe (1825–1855), British scholar and journalist
- William McFerrin Stowe (1913–1988), American bishop of the Methodist and United Methodist Churches
