= Elizabeth Greenwood =

New Zealand photographer (1873–1961)

- Born: Mary Elizabeth Greenwood; 1 January 1873; New Zealand
- Died: 28 July 1961 (aged 88); Wellington, New Zealand
- Known for: Photography
- Relatives: Ellen Greenwood (aunt); Jane Stowe (aunt); Sarah Greenwood (grandmother); John Danforth Greenwood (grandfather); John Greenwood (great-great-grandfather)

Mary Elizabeth Greenwood (1 January 1873 – 28 July 1961) was a New Zealand photographer. She was an early promoter of the autochrome photographic process in New Zealand. Her work is held by the Museum of New Zealand Te Papa Tongarewa and by the National Library of New Zealand.

== Biography ==
Greenwood was born on 1 January 1873, the daughter of Clara Maria Greenwood and Frederick Daw Greenwood. She owned and operated a commercial photographic studio, Elizabeth Greenwood Studios, on Woodward Street in Wellington from around 1906. Much of her work involved taking society and portrait photographs. Greenwood was also a member of the Wellington Camera Club and judged photographic competitions and gave lectures. In 1908 Greenwood was interviewed by a reporter of the Dominion newspaper on the autochrome photographic process. She gave the reporter a demonstration of the new technique. She retired in 1936.

A resident of Eastbourne, Greenwood died on 28 July 1961, and her ashes were buried in Karori Cemetery.

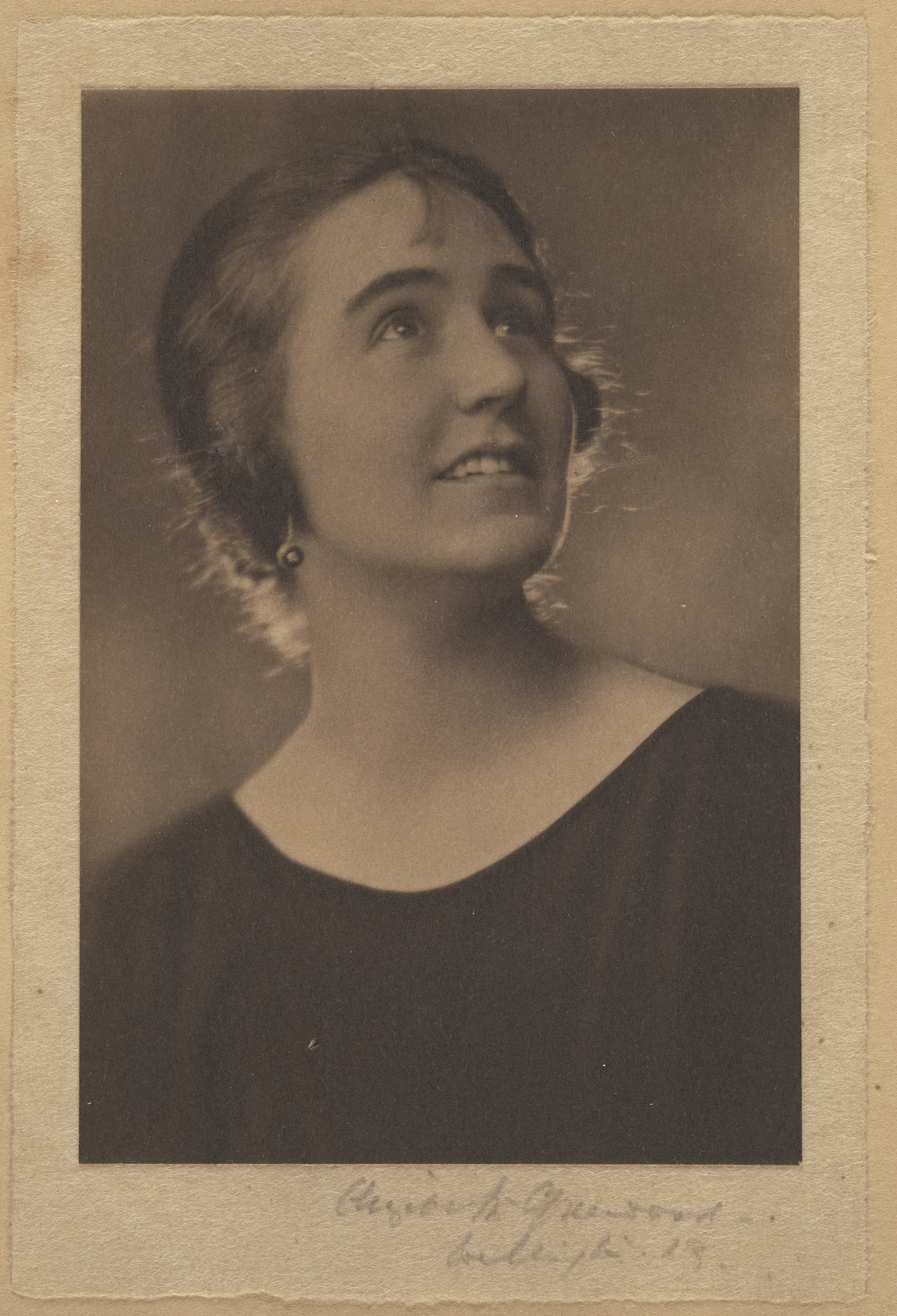
Example of Elizabeth Greenwood's work

Although the whereabouts of much of her photographic material and autochrome plates is unknown, the Museum of New Zealand Te Papa Tongarewa and the National Library of New Zealand hold several pieces of her work.

== Family ==
Greenwood's father, Frederick Daw Greenwood, was the brother of Ellen Greenwood and Jane Stowe. Greenwood's grandfather was John Danforth Greenwood who was married to the New Zealand artist, letter-writer and teacher Sarah Greenwood. Her great-great-grandfather was the early American portrait painter John Greenwood. Greenwood took a portrait photograph of her aunt, Ellen Greenwood, which she donated to the Levin Memorial Home in commemoration of her aunt's charitable work.
