= Leonard Stowe =

New Zealand inventor (1837–1920)

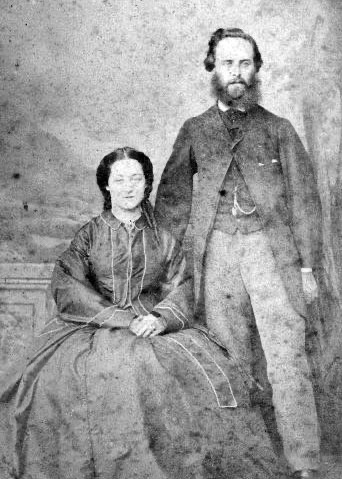
Leonard and Jane Stowe (née Greenwood) in the 1870s

Leonard Stowe CMG (1837–1920) was a New Zealand politician and inventor. He was Clerk of the Legislative Council and Clerk of Parliament.

Stowe was born in 1837 in Buckinghamshire, the son of William Stowe (1791–1860). The scholar and journalist William Henry Stowe was his brother.

On 31 May 1871, he married Jane Greenwood at Christ Church Cathedral, Nelson. Stowe died in 1920. He was buried in the Bolton Street Cemetery.

His daughter Emily Muriel Lysaght was the mother of Averil Lysaght and Muriel Mary Lysaght.
