= Thomas Johnston (engraver) =

American painter, japanner, and printmaker, 1708–1767

- Born: 1708; Boston, Massachusetts
- Died: May 8, 1767 (aged 58–59); Boston, Massachusetts
- Occupation: Engraver
- Known for: Engraving, organ building
- Notable work: First engraved print of an historical event in Colonial America, an overview of the Battle of Lake George

Thomas Johnston (1708 – May 8, 1767) (Note: Some sources spell his last name without the T as "Johnson", though the man himself signed his engravings as "Johnston" — for an example, see File:Johnston's View of Yale College.jpeg. On at least one engraving, his early Plan of Boston in New England, he also signed his name in the bottom right-hand corner as "Johnson". His various account books and his will refer to him with the "T" spelling.) was an American engraver, japanner, and heraldic painter in Colonial Boston. Johnston engraved the first print of an historical event in the Colonial America and was also the first manufacturer of church organs in the colonies. The pipe organ he built in 1758–1759 for Boston's Old North Church (Note: Though commonly referred to as "Old North Church", the church's official name is Christ Church in the City of Boston. Sources refer to this church by the names of "Old North" and also as "Christ Church".) was in use for over a hundred years until another organ replaced it in 1886.

== Pipe organ manufacturing ==
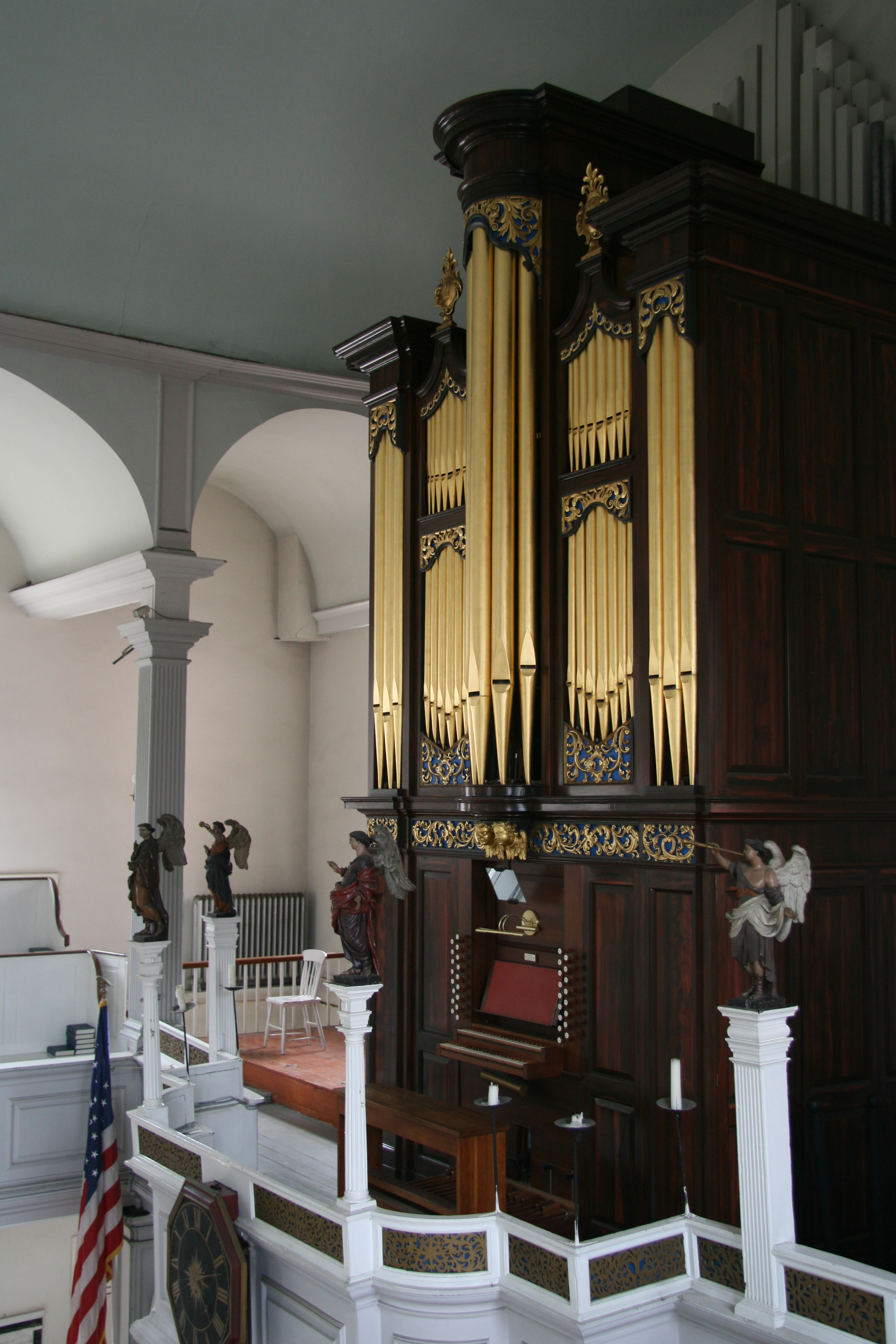
The Old North Church organ, case restored in the 1990s to the 1759 Johnston version

Johnston's workshop was in his home's backyard. While he advertised his businesses as being organ making, engraving, and furniture merchant, he also worked as a japanner, painted coats of arms, and published books. He was an engraver of skill and a heraldic painter whose works included views of Boston. His furniture skills included japanning, a technique of rendering "elaborate applied decorations" onto furniture.

Though at least one other person had created a singular organ in the colonies before him, Johnston is considered to have been the first Bostonian to build an organ and had the earliest church organ manufacturing business in Colonial America. Boston's Old North Church's first organ was one imported by William Claggett in 1736. In 1752, the church decided to buy a replacement organ from Johnston that they wanted to be as loud as the Boston Trinity Church organ. Johnston finishing constructing the organ in 1759. This Johnston pipe organ was in regular use until the 1820s. The present casing is the completely-restored case from the Johnston instrument. The organ's inner workings – the pipes, pedals, bellows and so on (though of Johnston's type) – are completely new and date to the complete renovation/restoration that was started in 1992. In 1754, Johnston built an organ for St. Peter's in Salem, Massachusetts. Johnston is also known to have built organs for Boston's Deblois Concert Hall and for St. John's Church (in Portsmouth, New Hampshire). Some of his organs originally installed in a first church or venue were then later re-used secondhand in other churches.

After Johnston's death, his estate included various items from his many businesses, among them an incomplete organ, numerous pictures, various paintings, artist supplies, and copper plates for engraving and printing. In his will, he gave his wife Bathsheba the engraved copper plates for printing music for the psalms stating “I Thomas Johnston Give to my Wife Bathsheba Johnston all my psalm Tune plates together with the Press besides what her proportionable part of my Estate may be.”

== Engravings ==
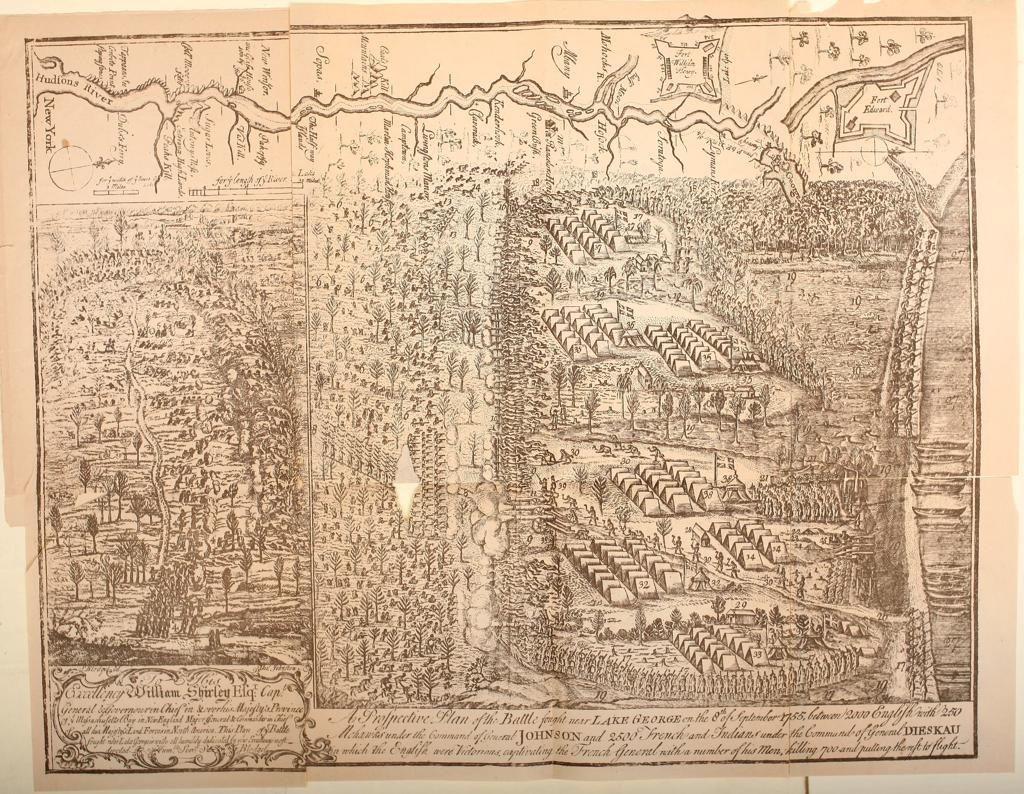
A prospective plan of the battle fought near Lake George on the 8th of September 1755 – 1890 facsimile of Johnston's 1755 original

A 1768 Jefferys engraving printed in London and based on the 1755 Johnston original

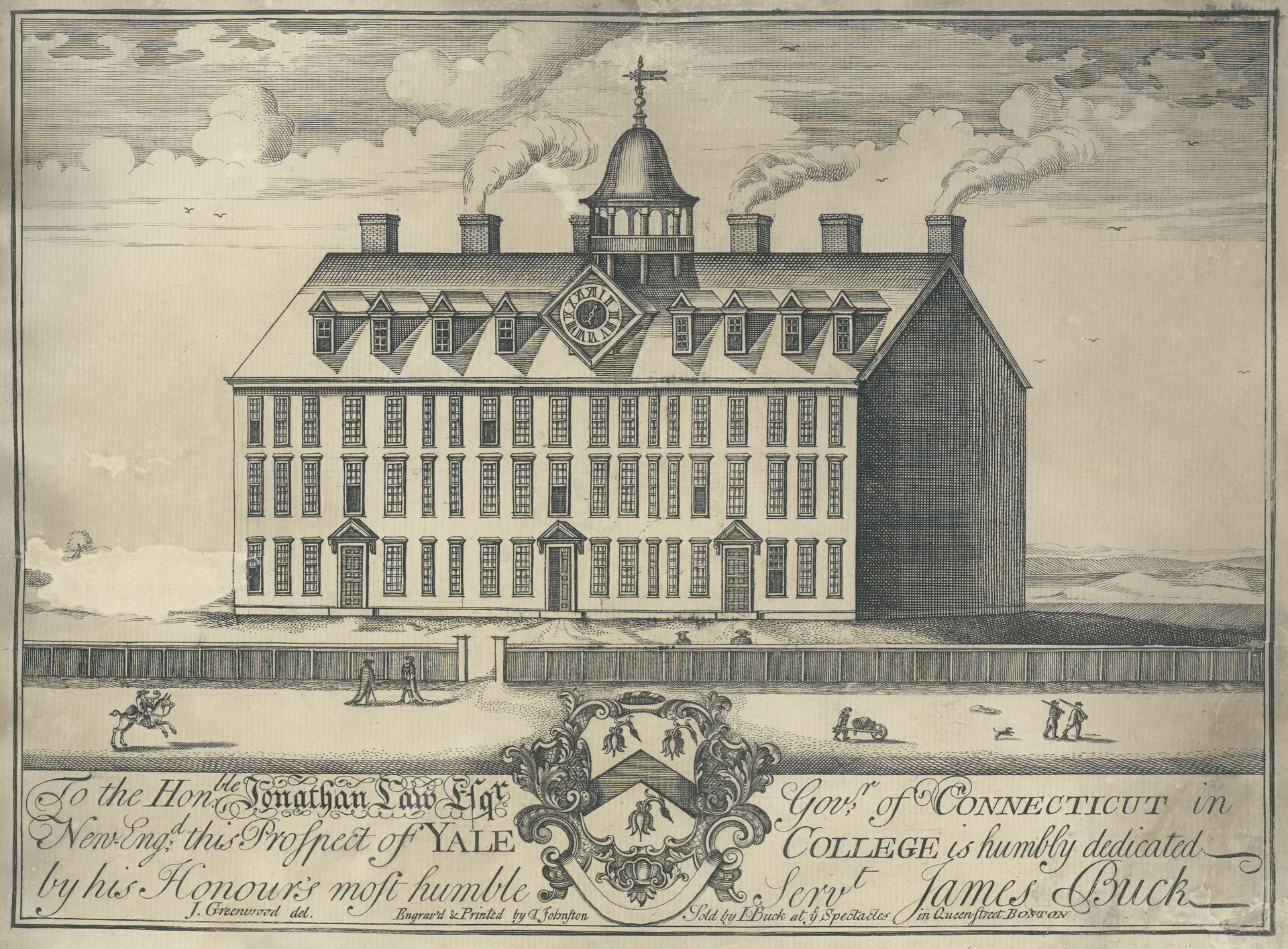
Johnston's Prospect of Yale College engraving, 1749

Patricia E. Kane, writing in Colonial Massachusetts Silversmiths and Jewelers, says that though "the identity of his master is not known" theorizes that Johnston may have been trained by the craftsman William Burgis. Kane's evidence for this is that the map of Boston published by Burgis in 1728 was engraved for Burgis by Johnston "just at the time that Johnston would have been finishing his apprenticeship". Johnston's earliest known engraving is that map of Boston, titled Plan of Boston in New England, with its dedication to Massachusetts Governor William Burnet, governor of the Massachusetts Colony from 1727–1729. Johnston's various engravings include prints of scenes, business cards for tradesmen, legal certificates, currency, and even noted music scores. One of his apprentices was John Greenwood, whose varied artistic career included an early period assisting Johnston with painting and engraving.

Johnston engraved the first known print of an historical event in the colonies, an overview of the Battle of Lake George. The battle scene —A prospective plan of the battle fought near Lake George on the 8th of September 1755 – was originally drawn by Samuel Blodgett, a sutler who had witnessed the Battle. Johnston engraved Blodgett's sketch onto a copper plate with Boston printer Richard Draper printing it, with the print then being sold by Blodgett in December 1755. Johnston's engraving of the battle is divided into different sections. On the left an above view of marching soldiers, on the right the view of the soldiers' camp and of the battle itself. The engraving also pictures the Hudson River, Fort William Henry and the New York town of Fort Edward. A pamphlet consisting of five pages describing the Battle plus a single page of advertisements accompanied this engraving. Johnston's print was reprinted in London by Thomas Jefferys, being published six weeks later in February 1756, along with an explanatory eight-page pamphlet.

Many of Johnston's print engravings along with various images can be found in the Colonial Society of Massachusetts' publication Boston Prints and Printmakers 1670–1775, including his engraving of artist John Greenwood's Yale College view, Prospect of Yale College.

== Personal life ==
Johnston was born in 1708 (Note: Ogasapian (2007) has Johnston's birth year as 1701.) in Boston, Massachusetts. He became a member of the Brattle Street Church on June 5, 1726.

Johnston's first wife was Rachel Thwing, they married on June 22, 1730. His second wife was Rachel's first cousin Bathsheba Thwing and that marriage took place 17 years later in 1747. Many of the sons developed careers based on skills adjacent to their father's various crafts and livelihoods. Three of Johnston's sons by his first wife Rachel — Thomas Jr., William, and Benjamin —all became artists or craftspeople of varying kinds, their skills including japanning, portrait painting, organ-building, and engraving. Rachel, a daughter from Johnston's first marriage, married Daniel Rea Jr. in 1764. After Johnston's death, Rea purchased his father-in-law's business and ran it until the early 1800s. John and Samuel Johnston, two of Johnston's sons from his second marriage, worked as portrait painters.

== Death ==
Johnston died (from what was called a fit of apoplexy) on May 8, 1767. His grave is located in Boston's historic King's Chapel Burying Ground.

== Bibliography ==
- American printmaking before 1876 : fact, fiction, and fantasy : papers presented at a symposium held at the Library of Congress, June 12 and 13, 1972. Library of Congress. 1975. pp. 59–60. ISBN 9780844401683. "Moreover, as in the case of other prints, Blodget's work, which came complete with a five-page quarto pamphlet"
- Babcock, Mary Kent Davey (1947). Christ Church, Salem Street, Boston, the Old North Church of Paul Revere fame: historical sketches, Colonial period, 1723–1775. T. Todd Co., printers.
- Dunlap, William; Bayley, Frank William; Goodspeed, Charles Eliot (1918). A History of the Rise and Progress of the Arts of Design in the United States. Vol. 3. C.E. Goodspeed & Company. ISBN 978-0-7222-4674-0.
- Exhibition Catalogs, 1886–1909: 1908–1909. Grolier Club. 1908.
- Genealogical and Biographical Record of New London County, Connecticut. J.H. Beers & Company. January 1, 1905.
- Green, Samuel A. (1890). Blodget's plan of the battle on the shores of Lake George, 8 September, 1755. Cambridge University Press.
- Hitchings, Sinclair (1973). "Thomas Johnston". Boston Prints and Printmasters 1670–1775. University Press of Virginia.
- Hitchings, Sinclair (1985). "The Musical Pursuits of William Price and Thomas Johnston". In Barbara Lambert (ed.). Volume 54: Music in Colonial Massachusetts 1630–1820, II: Music in Homes and in Churches. University Press of Virginia.
- Owen, Barbara (1979). The organ in New England: an account of its use and manufacture to the end of the nineteenth century. Sunbury Press. ISBN 978-0-915548-08-8.
- Owen, Barbara (1985). "Eighteenth-Century Organs and Organ Building in New England". In Barbara Lambert (ed.). Volume 54: Music in Colonial Massachusetts 1630-1820, II: Music in Homes and in Churches. University Press of Virginia.
- Ogasapian, John (2007). Church Music in America, 1620–2000. Mercer University Press. ISBN 978-0-88146-026-1.
- Publications of the Colonial Society of Massachusetts. The Society. 1918. p. 406. "Thomas Johnston (1708–1767) three of Johnston's children followed their father's profession."
- Stauffer, David McNeely (1907). American Engravers Upon Copper and Steel Part 1 Biographical Sketches Illustrated. Grolier club of New York City.
- Staff (1969). Treasures of Americana from the Library of the New-York Historical Society: A Short Title List of Rare and Important Books, Broadsides, Maps and Manuscripts on Exhibition at the Society, January 24 – August 29, 1969. New York Historical Society. "This is the first historical print engraved in America. Blodget witnessed the battle and immediately afterwards drew the original plan from which Thomas Johnson made the line engraving."
- Williams, Cornelia Bartow (1915). Ancestry of Lawrence Williams. R.R. Donnelley and Sons Co. p. 177.
- Winsor, Justin, ed. (1887). Narrative and Critical History of America: The English and French in North America, 1689–1763 Volume V - Part II. Houghton, Mifflin.
