= John Greenwood (artist) =

American painter

John Greenwood Sr.
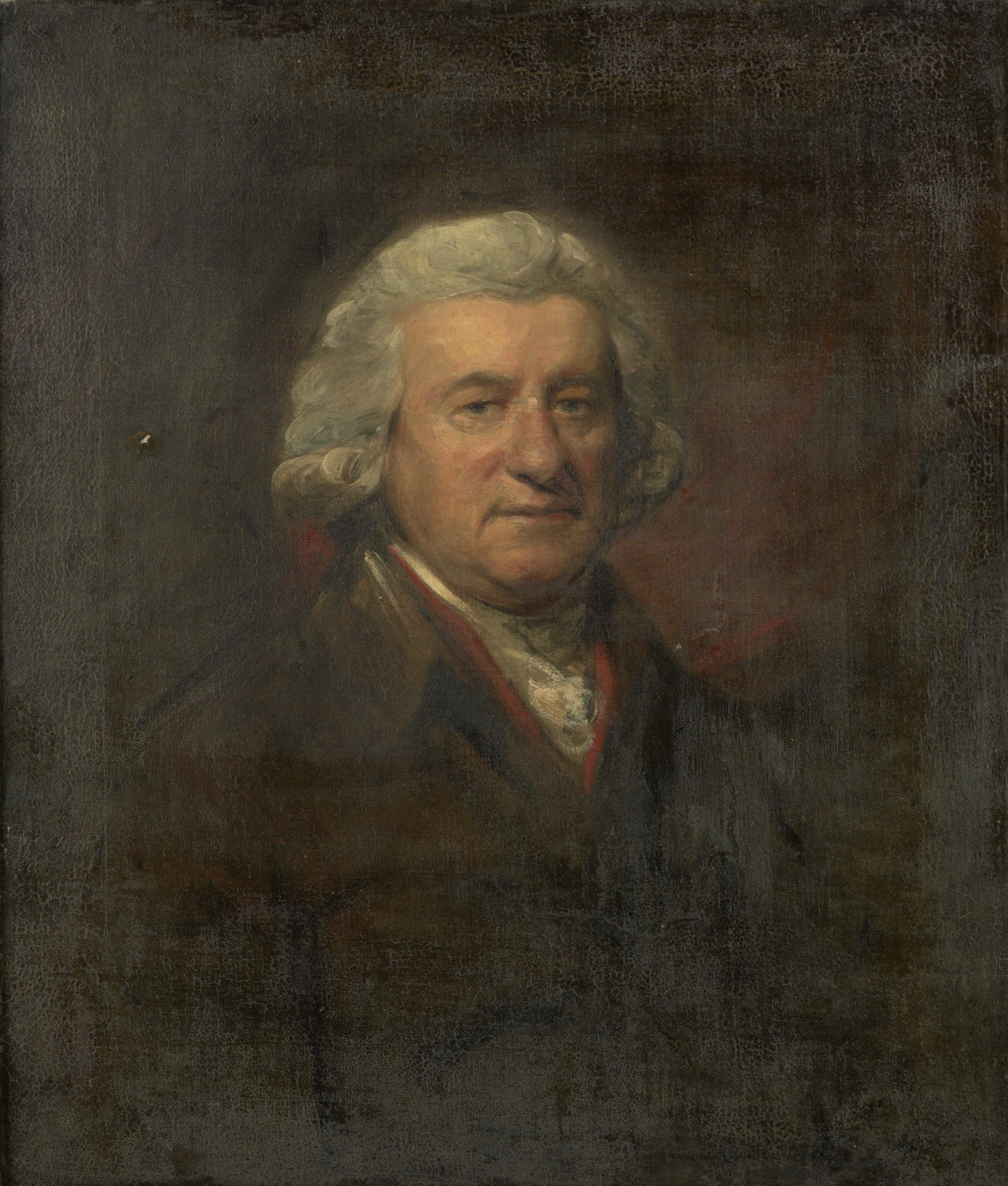
- Portrait by Lemuel Francis Abbott, c. 1785
- Born: 7 December 1727; Boston, Massachusetts
- Died: 16 September 1792 (aged 64); Margate, Kent
- Known for: Painter
- Notable work: Sea Captains Carousing in Surinam
- Movement: Realism
- Relatives: John Danforth Greenwood (grandson); Ellen Greenwood (great-granddaughter); Jane Stowe (great-granddaughter)

John Greenwood Sr. (7 December 1727 – 16 September 1792) was an American painter, engraver and auctioneer.

== Life ==
Greenwood was born on 7 December 1727 in Boston, Massachusetts, and baptized on 10 December in the Old North Church, Boston.

His father died insolvent in 1742 and at about this time Greenwood apprenticed to Thomas Johnston, a Boston line engraver, sign painter, and japanner. According to his son's later account, Greenwood soon left Johnston's studio in order to pursue portraiture. He left Boston in 1752 and traveled to the Dutch colony of Surinam in northeast South America. He stayed there for over five years, during which time he executed 115 portraits, before traveling again, this time to Europe, arriving in Amsterdam in May 1758. He settled there for a time to learn the art of making mezzotints, and was documented as a member of the Amsterdam Drawing Academy in 1758 by Jacob Otten Husly. After leaving Amsterdam, Greenwood stayed in Paris, then London, where he eventually settled in 1764.

At the request of the Earl of Bute Greenwood made a journey, in July 1771, into Holland and France purchasing paintings; he afterwards visited the continent, buying up the collections of Count van Schulembourg and the Baron Steinberg. In 1776 he was occupying Ford's Rooms in the Haymarket as an art auctioneer.

One of Greenwood's best-known works is Sea Captains Carousing in Surinam (1755), a drunken scene featuring various prominent Rhode Island merchants, including Declaration of Independence signatory Stephen Hopkins, Governor Joseph Wanton, Admiral Esek Hopkins, and Governor Nicholas Cooke.

Greenwood died while on a visit to Margate, Kent on 16 September 1792, and is buried there. His wife, who survived him a few years, was buried at Chiswick, close to the tomb of Hogarth.

== Family ==
Greenwood was the son of Samuel Greenwood (1690–1742), a Harvard graduate (1709) and merchant, and his second wife, Mary Charnock Devereux (c. 1709-1794). In 1770, Greenwood wrote to his childhood friend, the painter John Singleton Copley, to commission a portrait of his mother Mary Charnock Devereux: ‘I am very desirous of seeing the good lady’s face as she now appears, with old age creeping upon her.’ this portrait is now part of the international painting collection at the Museum of New Zealand Te Papa Tongarewa.

His eldest son, Charnock-Gladwin, died an officer in the army at Grenada, West Indies; the second, John, succeeded him in business; James returned to Boston; and the youngest, Captain Samuel Adam Greenwood, senior-assistant at the residency of Baroda, died at Cambray in 1810.

His son John Greenwood, Jr. (1772–1815) is the subject of a portrait by William Beechey.

His grandson John Danforth Greenwood married the artist, Sarah Greenwood (née Field). They had thirteen children, including Ellen Greenwood and Jane Stowe.

The artist's family

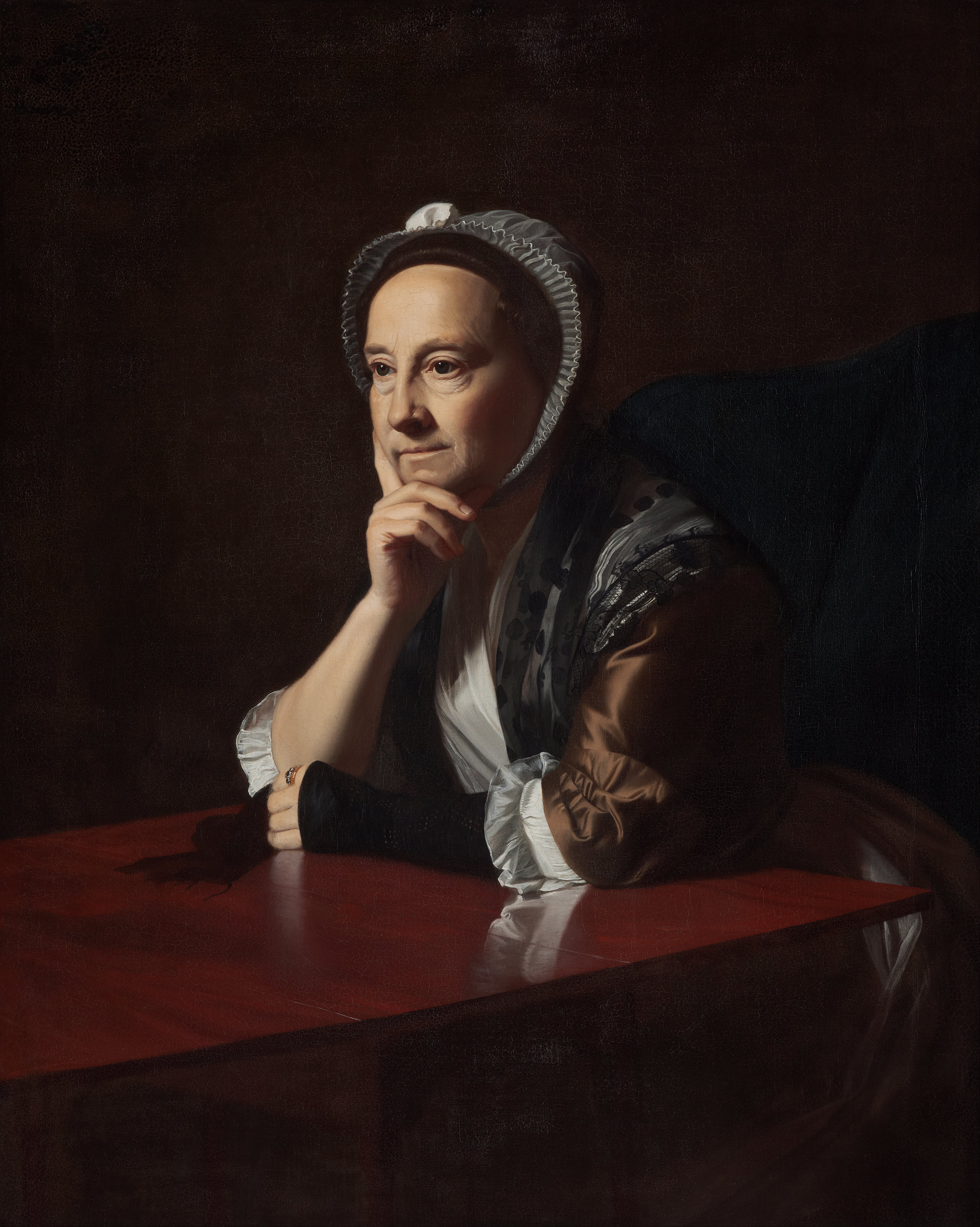
Mrs Devereux was the second wife of Samuel Greenwood and mother of John Greenwood; John S Copley 1770

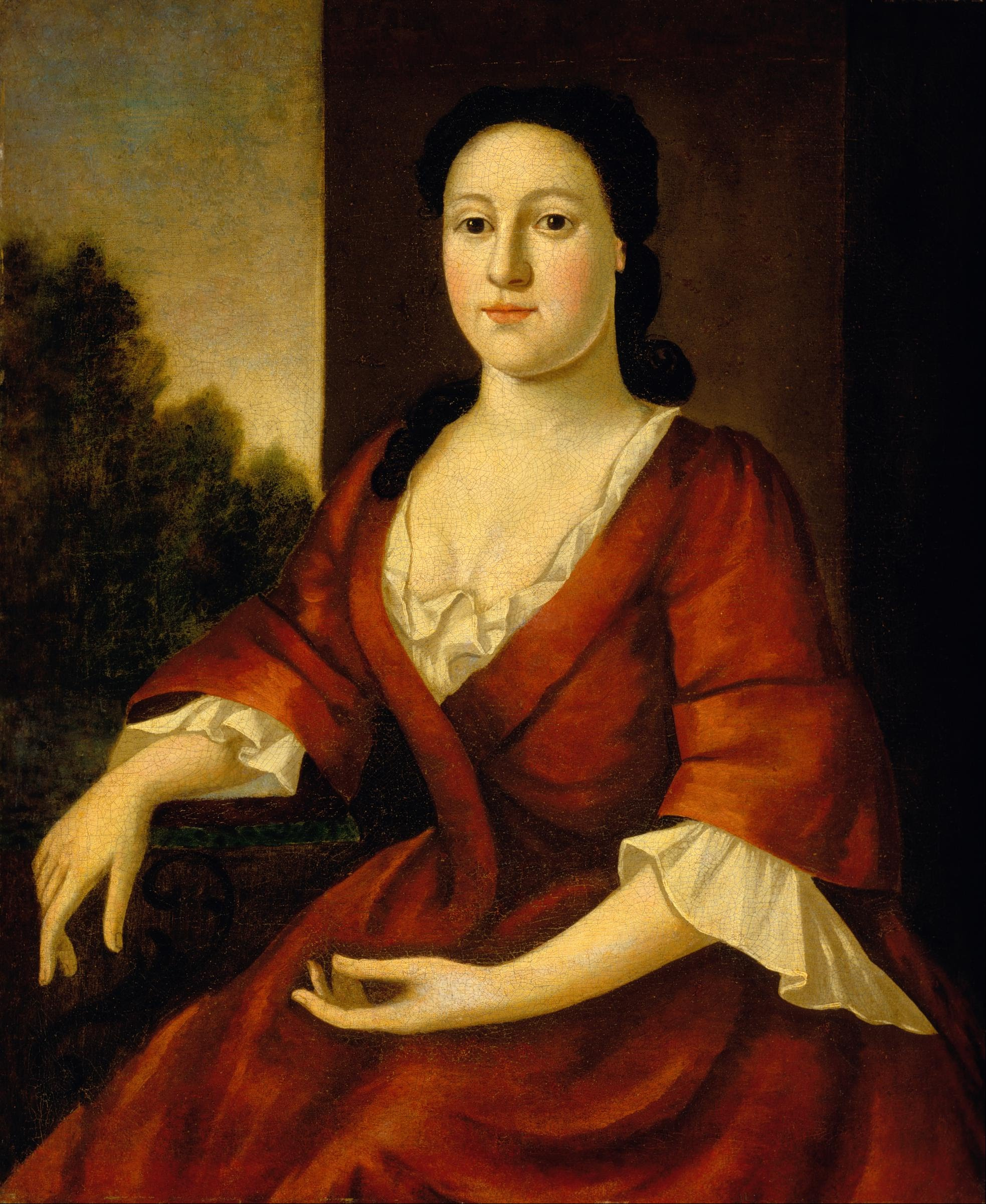
Portrait of Mrs. John Greenleaf

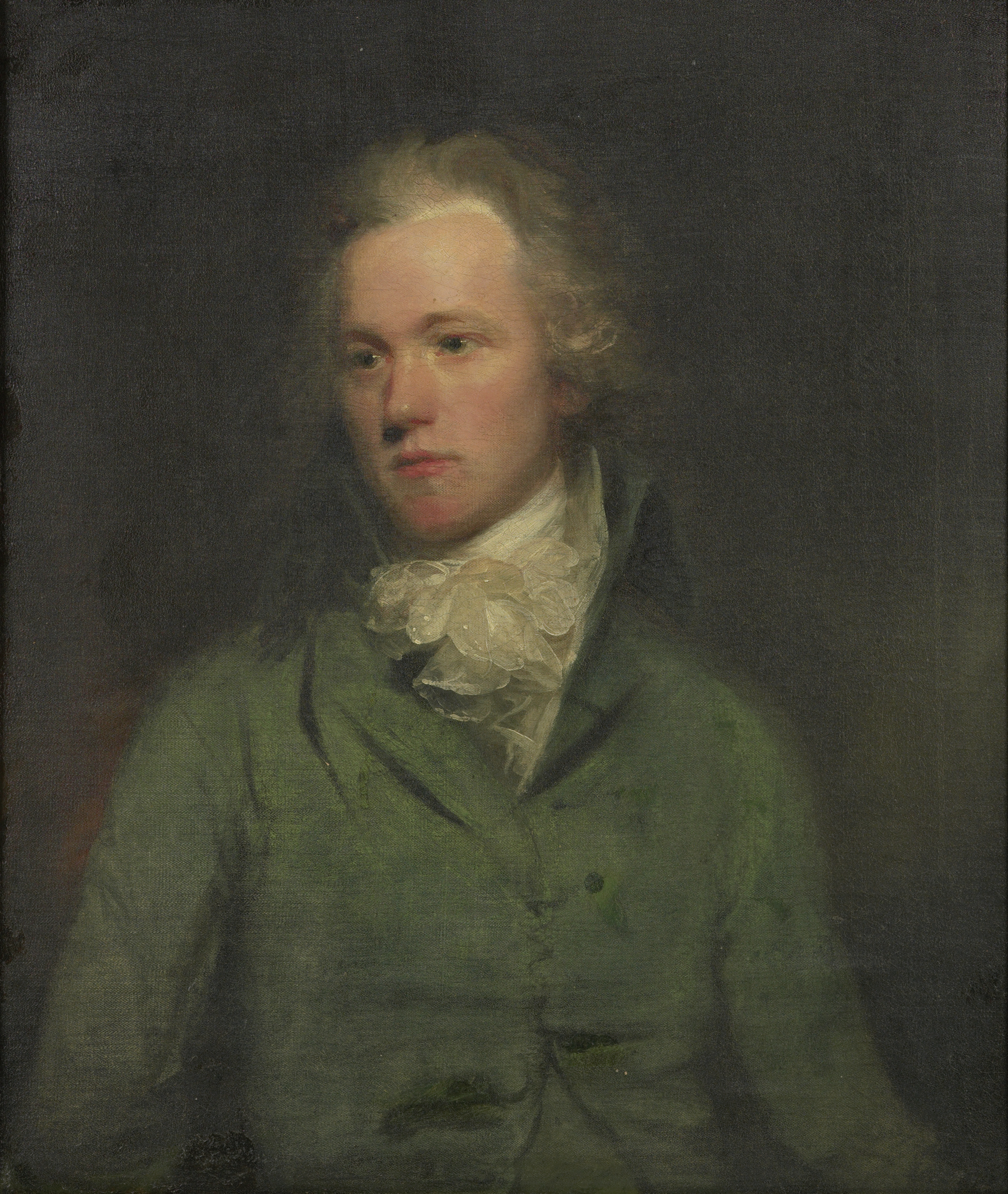
Portrait of Greenwoods son John Greenwood, Jr. by William Beechey circa 1795

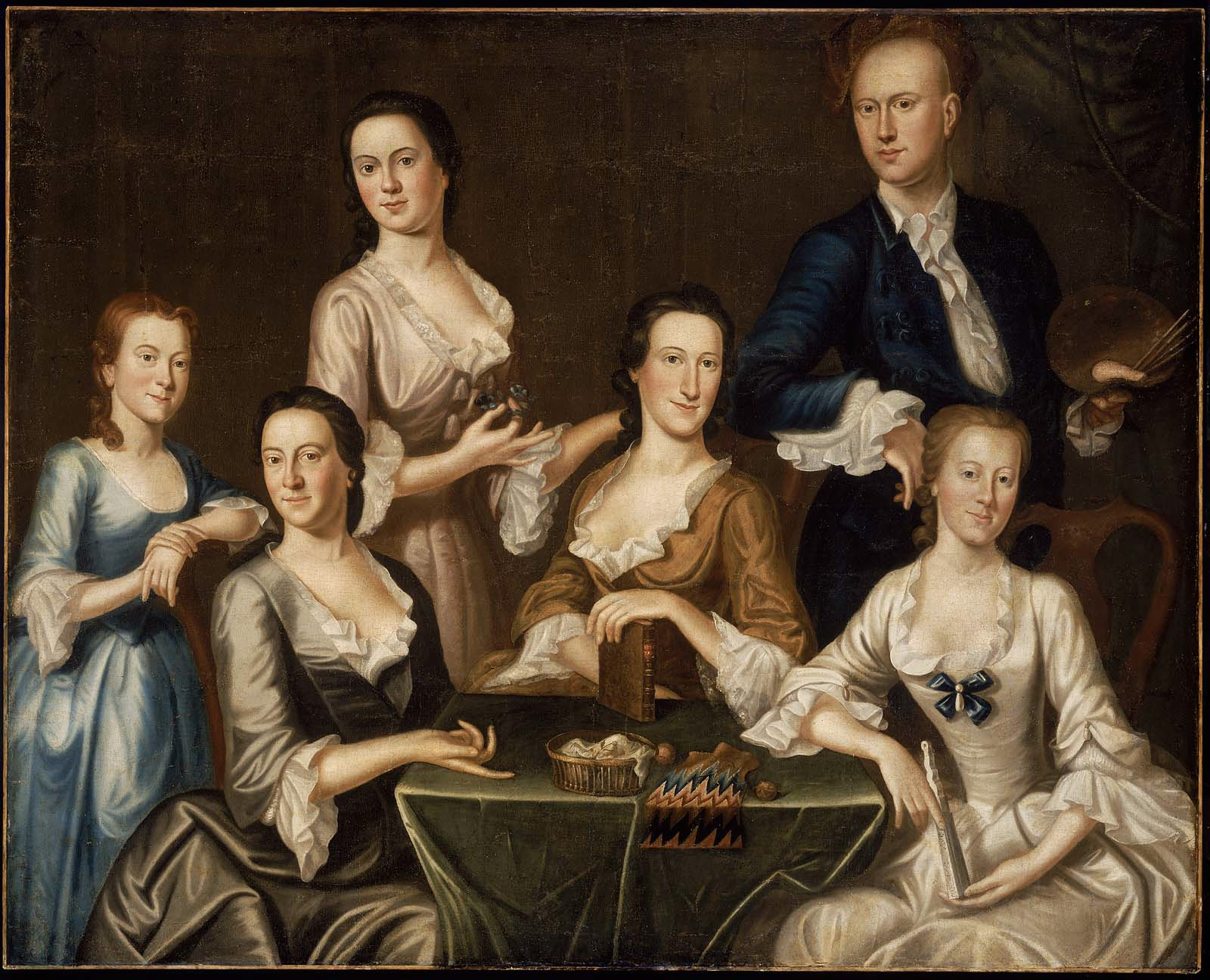
The Greenwood-Lee Family including a self-portrait of the artist circa 1747

== Selected works ==
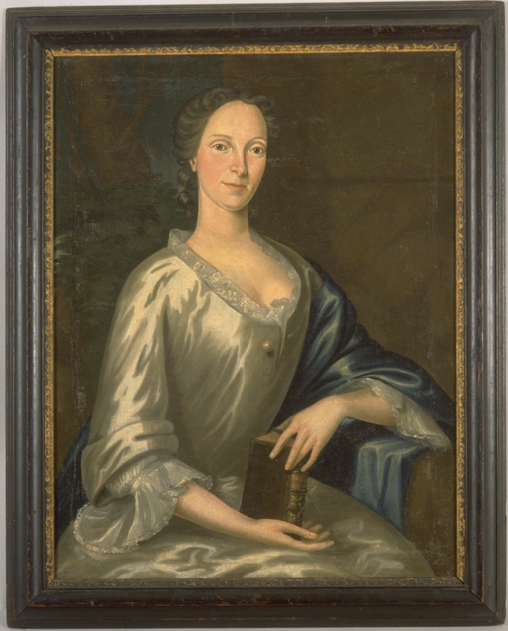
Portrait of Mrs. Mary Fitch Cabot (1745–1752)

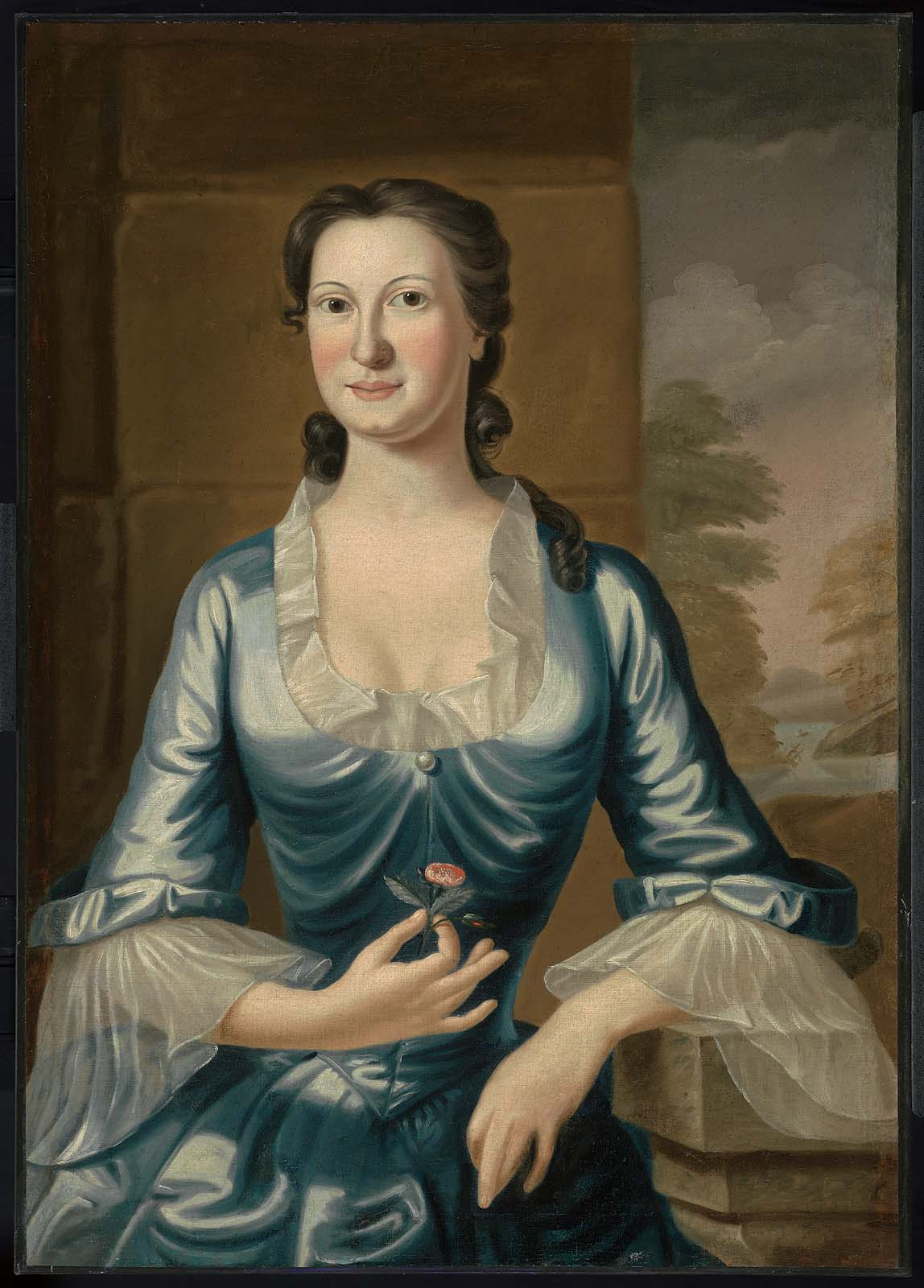
Mrs. Henry Bromfield (Margaret Fayerweather) (1749)

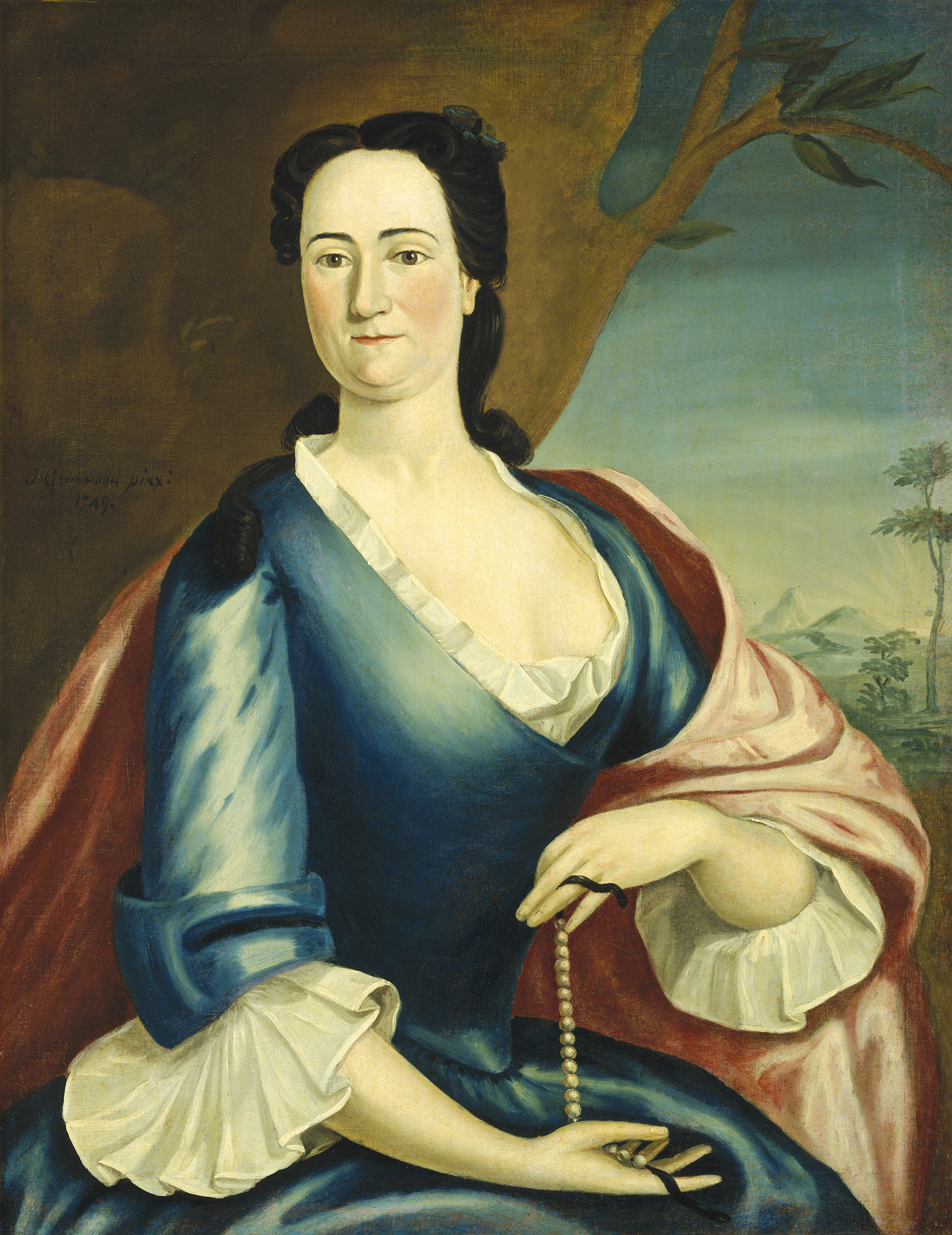
Portrait of Mrs. John Greenleaf (1749)

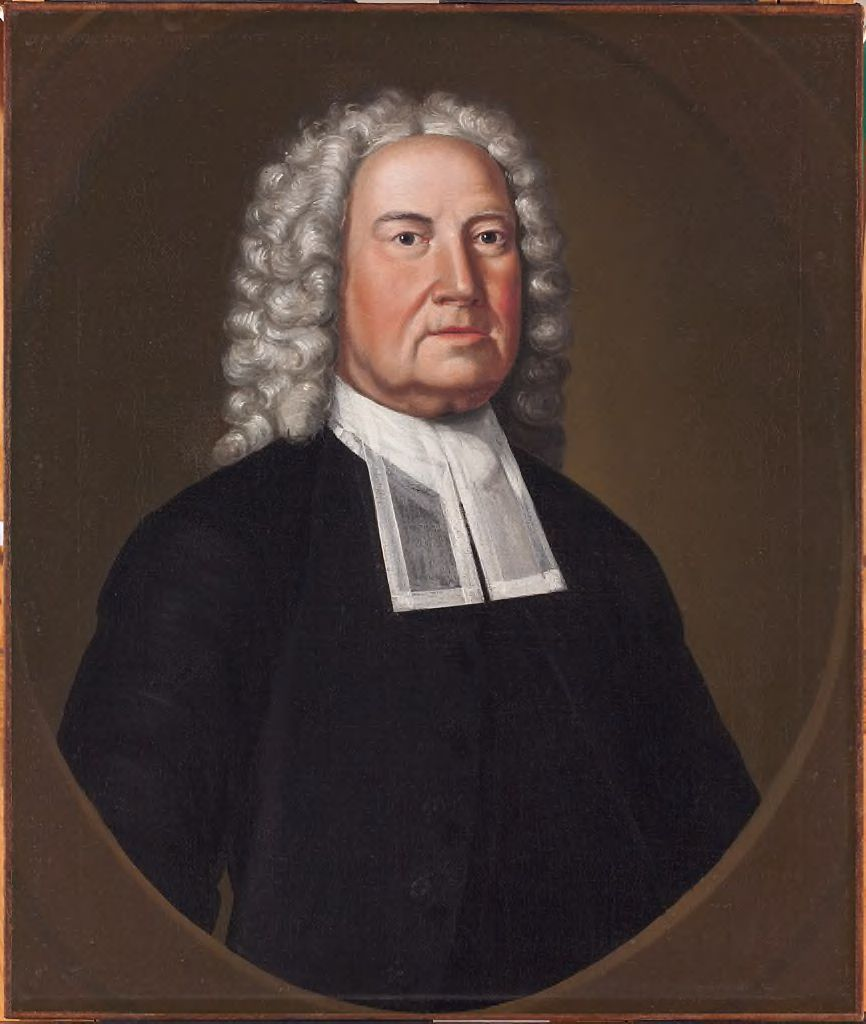
Portrait of Henry Flynt (1749–1750)

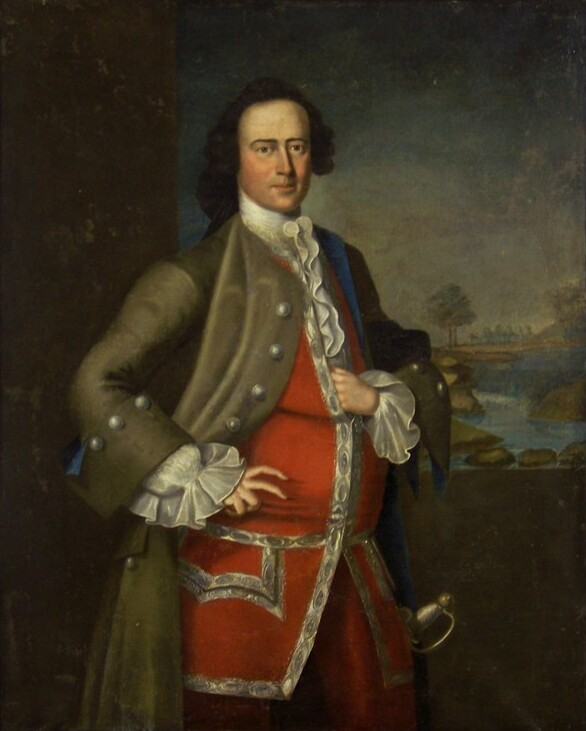
Portrait of Thomas Westbrook Waldron (1750)

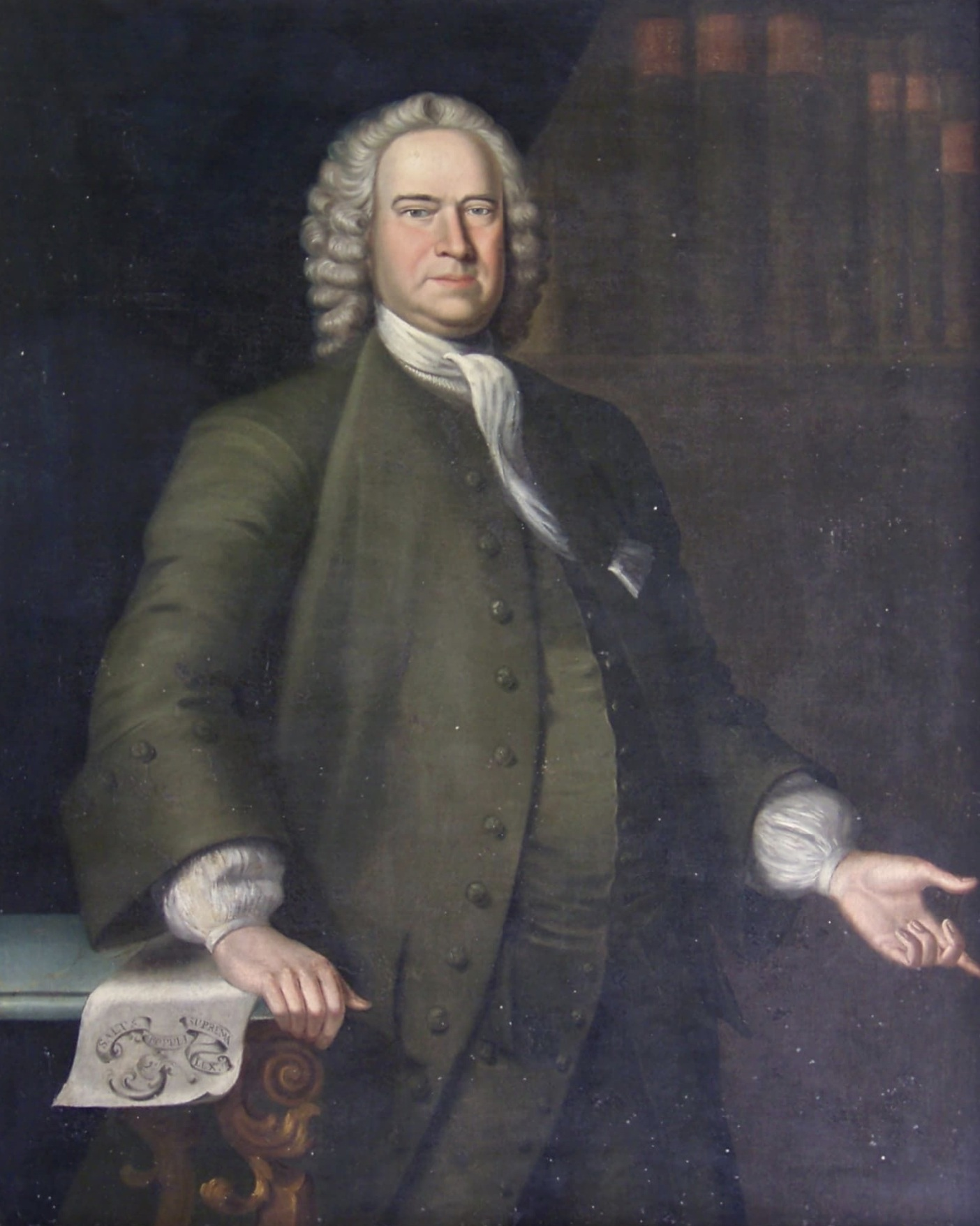
Portrait of Richard Waldron (1751)

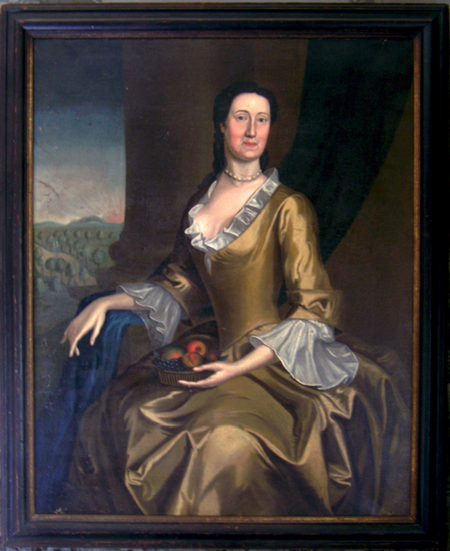
Portrait of Mrs. Richard Waldron (1751)

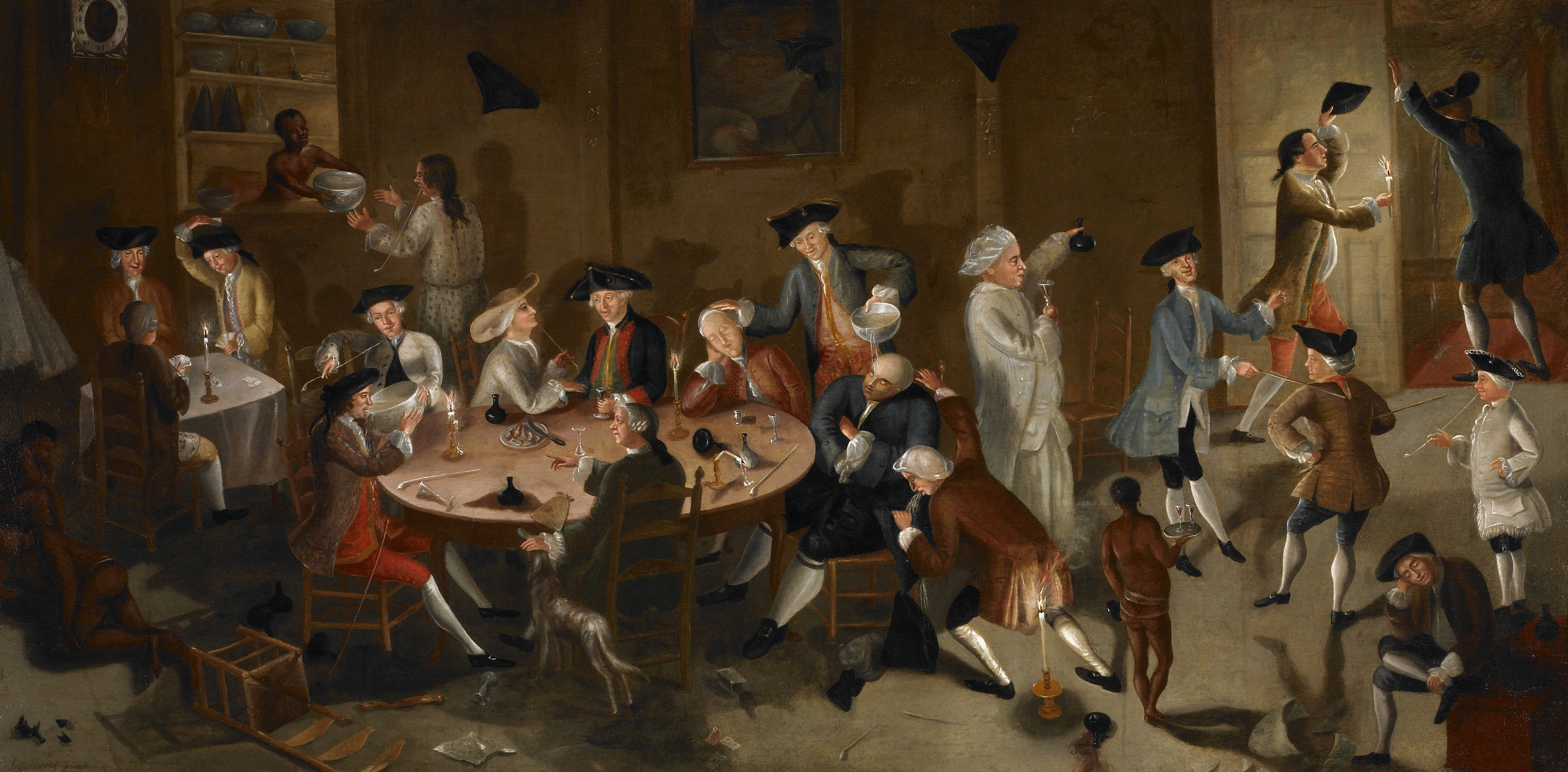
Sea Captains Carousing in Surinam (1755–1758)

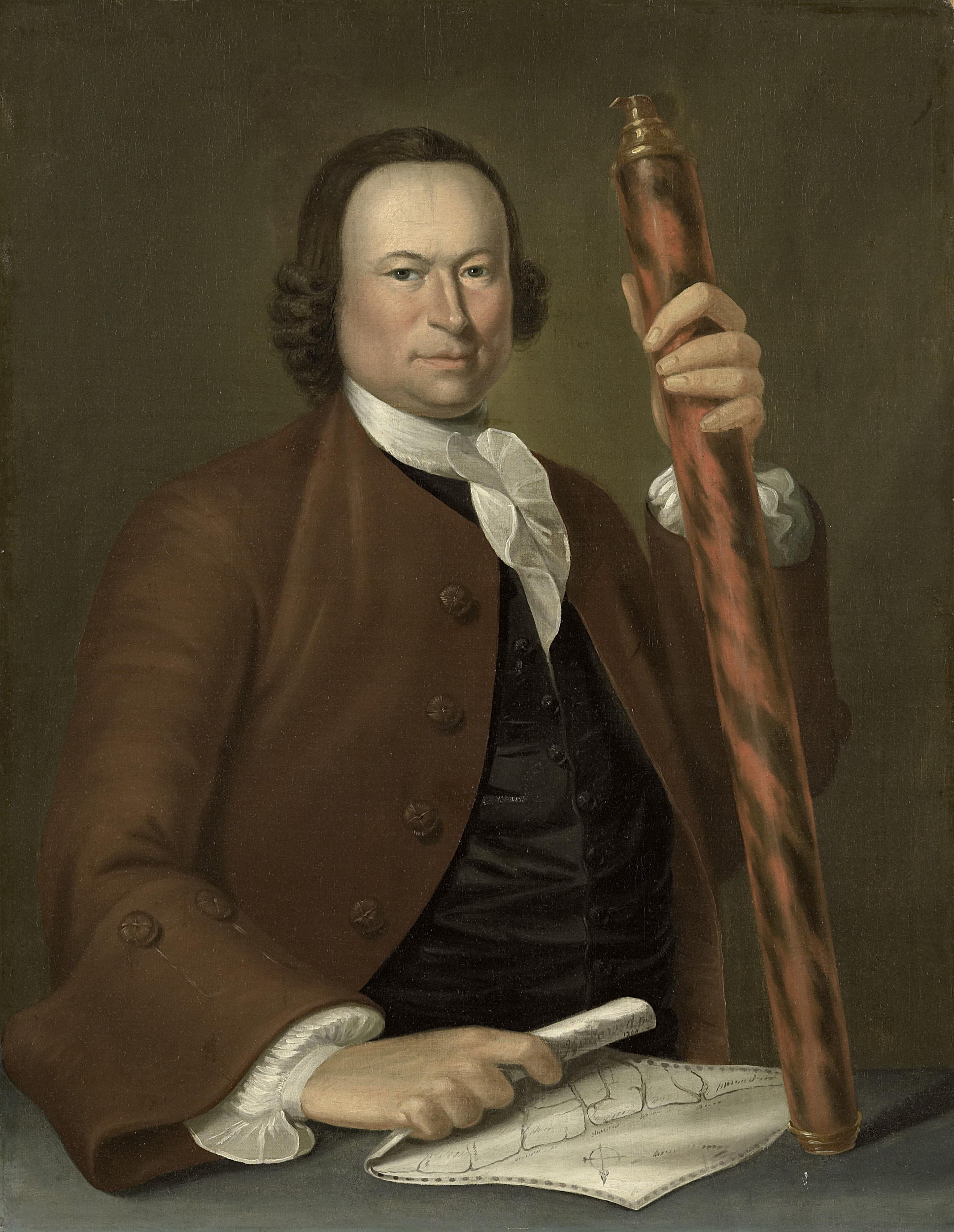
Portrait of Captain Dirk Simonsz (1760)

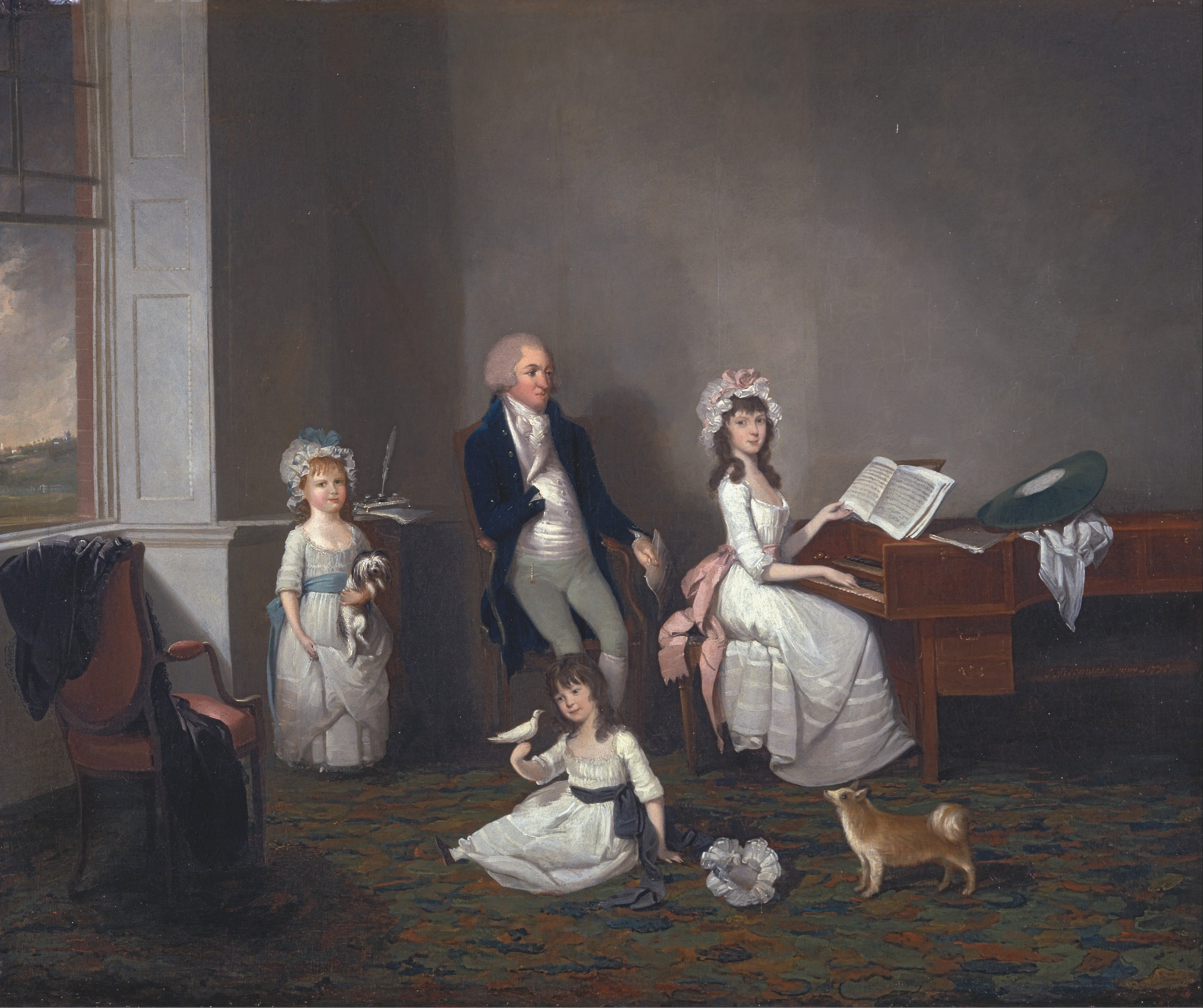
John Richard Comyns of Hylands, Essex, with His Daughters (1775)

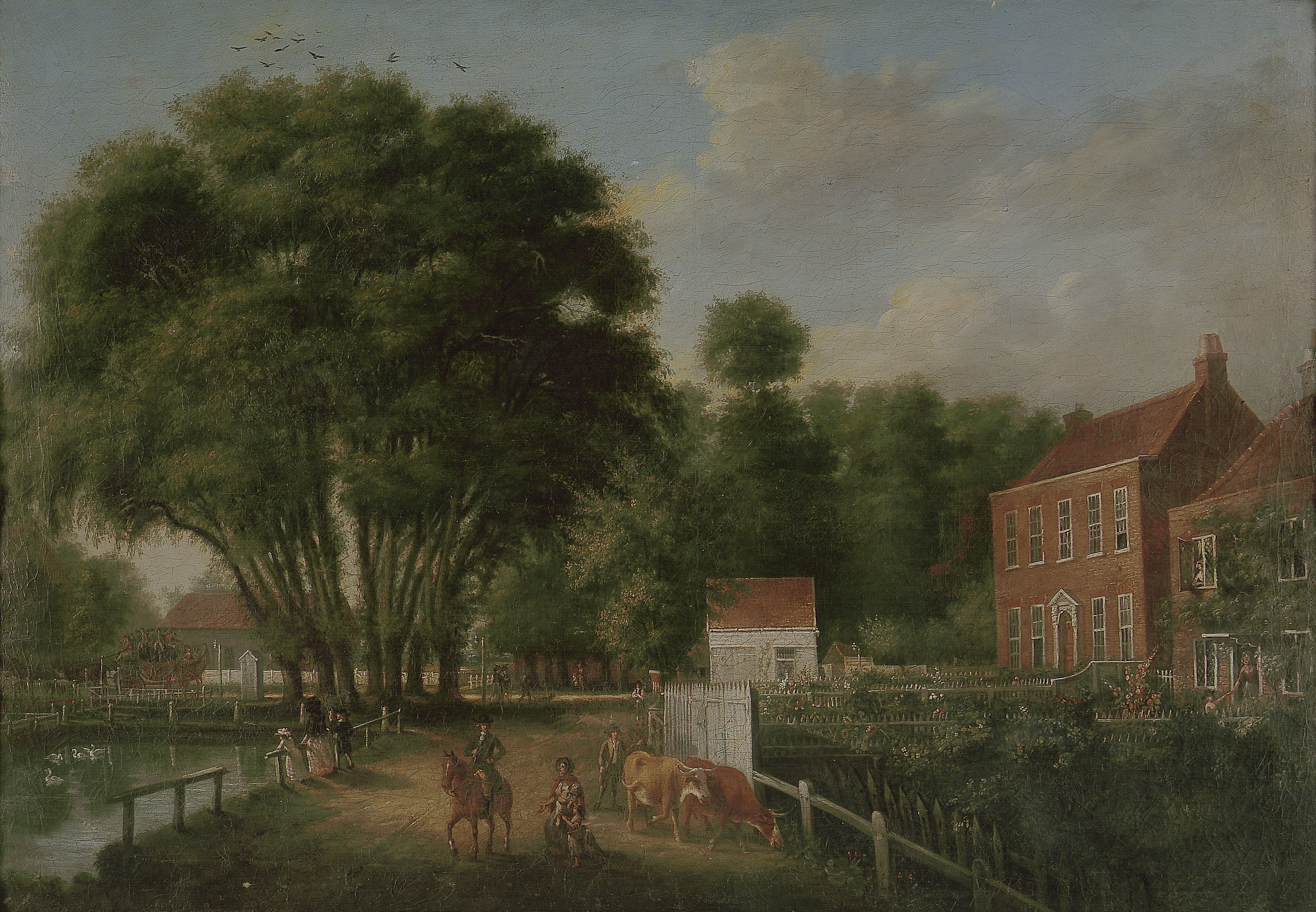
The seven sisters of Tottenham (1790)
