= Jane Stowe =

New Zealand artist

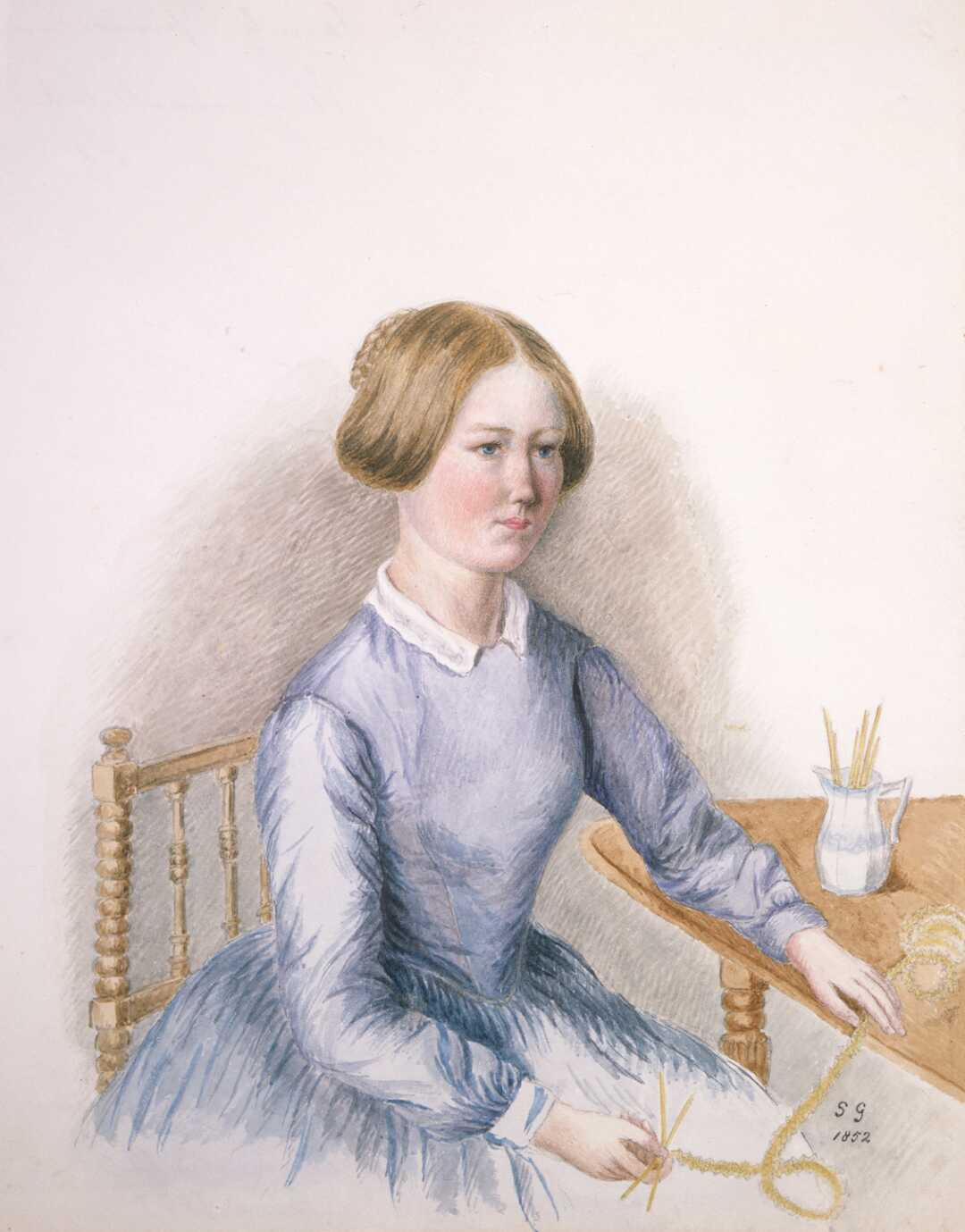
- Portrait of Stowe as a 13-year-old, by her mother, Sarah Greenwood, in February 1852
- Born: Jane Greenwood; 18 April 1838
- Died: 5 November 1931 (aged 93); Wellington, New Zealand
- Spouse: Leonard Stowe (m. 1871; died 1920)
- Children: 4
- Relatives: Sarah Greenwood (mother); John Danforth Greenwood (father); Ellen Greenwood (sister); Elizabeth Greenwood (niece); Averil Lysaght (granddaughter); Mary Watt (granddaughter); John Greenwood (great-grandfather)
- Elected: New Zealand Academy of Fine Arts

Jane Stowe (née Greenwood; 18 April 1838 – 5 November 1931) was a New Zealand artist.

== Biography ==
=== Early life and career ===
Stowe was born on 18 April 1838, the third daughter of John Danforth Greenwood and Sarah Greenwood (née Field), and baptised on 25 May 1838 at St Mark's Church, Kennington, London, England. The family migrated to New Zealand on the Phoebe, departing Gravesend on 16 November 1842 and arriving in Nelson on 29 March the following year. John Danforth Greenwood was ship's surgeon on the voyage and, as such, gained free passage for his family. Finding that their balloted section in Nelson was swampy, they soon settled at Motueka.

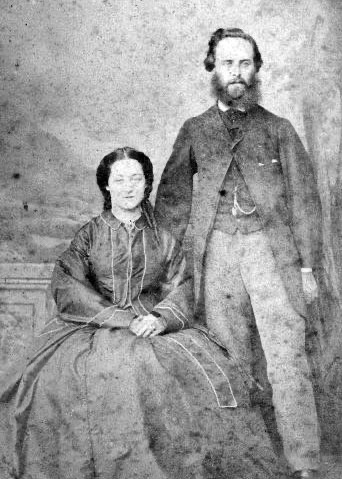
Jane and Leonard Stowe in the 1870s.

On 31 May 1871, she married Leonard Stowe, son of William Stowe, at Christ Church Cathedral, Nelson. They had two sons and two daughters. They lived at Tiakiwai House in Wellington for many years.

Stowe was exhibited with the Fine Arts Association, Wellington, from 1883 to 1884, the New Zealand Academy of Fine Arts from 1889 to 1931, and the Melbourne Centennial Exhibition in 1888. In 1885, she was award third place in hand-painted screen bellows, and first place in hand-painted doors at the New Zealand Exhibition. In the 1887 Wellington Art Exhibition, she won a prize for hand-painted door panels. She continued painting and exhibited up until her death, and was recorded in 1928, at 91 years of age, selling Afternoon, Wellington Harbour at the Academy of Fine Arts exhibition.

Several of Stowe's watercolours are in the Alexander Turnbull Library. Her daughter Emily Muriel Lysaght, also an artist, was the mother of Averil Lysaght and Muriel Mary Lysaght.

=== Death ===
Stowe died in Wellington on 5 November 1931, at the age of 93, and was buried in the Bolton Street Cemetery. She had been predeceased by her husband, Leonard Stowe, in 1920.
