= John Lysaght Moore =

New Zealand artist (1897–1965)

John Lysaght Moore (28 March 1897 – 8 June 1965) was a New Zealand painter, printmaker, weaver and knitter. His work is in the collections of the National Library of New Zealand, the Museum of New Zealand Te Papa Tongarewa and the Auckland Art Gallery.

== Biography ==
Moore was born in Hāwera in 1897 to Francis Edward Moore and his wife Sophia Augusta Lysaght. One of his paternal great-grandfathers was Charles Montagu-Scott, 4th Duke of Buccleuch. He was the nephew of Admiral Sir Arthur Moore and the New Zealand cricketer Henry Moore. He was a cousin of Averil Lysaght and Mary Watt.

Moore moved with his mother to Wellington, then to Havelock North in Hawke's Bay. He served overseas in the New Zealand Medical Corps during World War I. He studied art in Wellington with D. K. Richmond and H. L. Richardson, then studied in Europe, attending Goldsmiths College, London School of Art, and the British Academy in Rome from 1923 to 1927.

After the 1931 Hawke's Bay earthquake, Moore and another Hawke's Bay artist donated between 60 and 70 watercolours of local scenery to be sold in aid of earthquake relief. When the Auckland Society of Arts held an exhibition of his watercolour landscapes in 1935, the New Zealand Herald commented: "He prefers to interpret nature in her more sombre moods, and his pictures for the most part are subdued in colour, soft greens, greys and blues predominating, with warm brown occasionally used in the foregrounds."

Moore bought a house in York Bay in Lower Hutt in 1937, but did not move from Havelock North until 1947, after which he lived in York Bay with his older sister Evelyn.
