= William Henry Stowe =

William Henry Stowe (1 January 1825 – 22 June 1855) was a scholar and journalist.

== Biography ==
He was the eldest son of William and Mary Stowe, and was born at Buckingham on 1 January 1825. His brother was Leonard Stowe.

After attending a school at Iffley, near Oxford, he spent six months at King Edward's School, Birmingham. Leaving at Easter 1840, he studied medicine for three years at Buckingham, but, finding the pursuit uncongenial, entered at Wadham College, Oxford, in January 1844. At Oxford he was intimately associated with George Granville Bradley (afterwards Dean of Westminster), John Conington, and other members of the Rugby set. In 1848 he was placed in the first class in the final classical school with Edward Parry (afterwards Bishop Suffragan of Dover) and William Stubbs (afterwards Bishop of Oxford). After occupying himself for two years in private tuition at Oxford, he began in 1851 a connection with The Times by contributing literary articles, among them a comparison of the characteristics of Thackeray and Dickens. In March 1852 he obtained an open fellowship at Oriel College, and afterwards entered at Lincoln's Inn.

In May 1852 John Walter, the proprietor, gave him a permanent post on the staff of The Times. His work for the paper was mainly confined to literary subjects, although he wrote many leading articles on miscellaneous topics. His reviews of John William Kaye's History of the War in Afghanistan and of Dickens's David Copperfield were reissued in Essays from the Times (2nd ser. 1854), edited by Samuel Phillips. Other literary notices by him of interest were on Niebuhr's Letters (1853) and on The Mechanical Inventions of James Watt (1855). His obituary article on Lord Brougham appeared in The Times of 11 May 1868, thirteen years after Stowe's own death.

In 1855 The Times organised a "sick and wounded fund" for the relief of the British army in the Crimea, and Stowe was selected to proceed to the east as the fund's almoner. He reached Constantinople (now Istanbul) before the end of February, and was soon at Scutari (now Üsküdar), whence he moved to Balaklava. There he visited the hospitals and camp, and reported on the defects of the sanitary situation. "Others talked, Mr. Stowe acted," wrote Frances Margaret Taylor, the author of Eastern Hospitals and English Nurses (1857). On 16 March his first letter from the Crimea appeared in The Times, and described the Balaklava hospitals and the health of the army. Many further despatches on like subjects followed up to midsummer 1855. Two of Stowe's letters (Nos. 80 and 81) described the third bombardment of Sebastopol, and were included in The Times Crimean War correspondent William Howard Russell's The War (1855). But Stowe's health was unable to resist the fatigue and exposure to an unhealthy climate which were incident to his labours. He died of camp fever at Balaklava on 22 June 1855 and was buried in the cemetery there (see Illustrated London News, 22 November 1855). A cenotaph to his memory was erected by friends in the chapel of Oriel College. John Walter, in a leading article in The Times of 6 July 1855, recounted Stowe's experiences in the Crimea, and characterised his despatches as "an astonishing effort of intellectual and descriptive talent."
