= Danforth Greenwood =

New Zealand physician, newspaper editor and headmaster

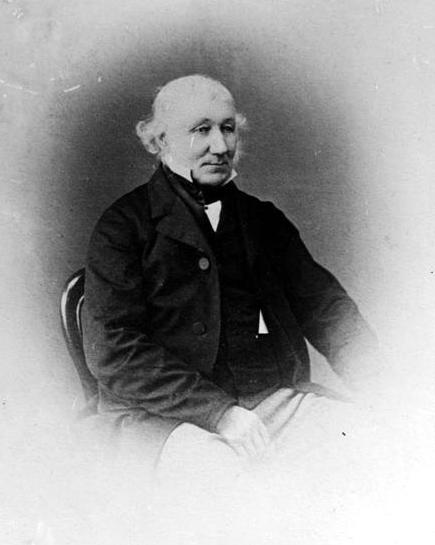

4th Headmaster of Nelson College
- In office 1863–1865
- Preceded by: Reginald Broughton
- Succeeded by: Charles Lendrick MacLean

Personal details
- Born: John Danforth Greenwood; 4 January 1803 London, England
- Died: 15 June 1890 (aged 87) Motueka, New Zealand
- Resting place: Pioneer Park, Motueka
- Spouse: Sarah Field (m. 1831; died 1889)
- Children: 13
- Relatives: John Greenwood (grandfather); Ellen Greenwood (daughter); Jane Stowe (daughter); Elizabeth Greenwood (granddaughter); John D. H. Greenwood (grandson); Leonard Greenwood (grandson); Averil Lysaght (great-granddaughter); Mary Watt (great-granddaughter)

John Danforth Greenwood (1803–1890) was a New Zealand medical doctor, newspaper editor, amateur painter and principal of Nelson College. His grandfather was the portrait painter John Greenwood.

== Biography ==
John Danforth Greenwood was a physician, at Mitcham, Surrey. He married Sarah Field in 1831. They had thirteen children, including Ellen Greenwood and Jane Greenwood. His daughter Frances Mary Greenwood married William Pharazyn (1842–1872) the son of Charles Johnson Pharazyn.

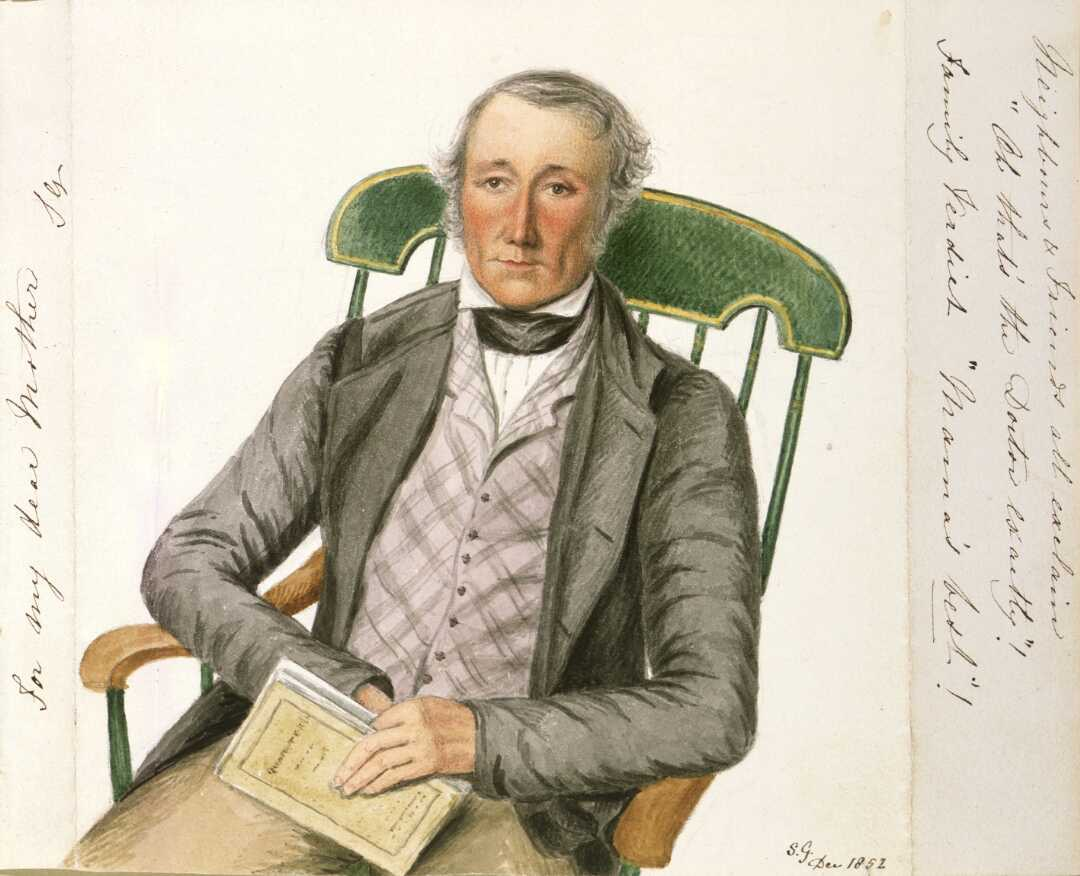
Portrait of Greenwood by his wife, Sarah (1852)

He and his wife, Sarah, connected over art and music. Until ill-health forced his retirement in 1837, Danforth Greenwood continued his medical practice. The family then moved to Charenton-le-Pont, France. In 1842, they bought New Zealand Company sections in Wellington, Nelson and Motueka. He received free passage for himself and his family as ship's surgeon superintendent, on the Phoebe at Gravesend on 16 November 1842. In 1843, they settled in Motueka and built their house called "Woodlands."

They also lived in Nelson where he held roles such as justice of the peace, inspector of schools (1857 to 1863), board member of Nelson College (1855 to 1863) and headmaster of Nelson College (1863 to 1865). He was editor of the Nelson Examiner for several years. He also was appointed Sergeant-at-Arms in the House of Representatives by the Speaker Sir David Monro from 1866 to 1871.

Greenwood died on 15 June 1890 in Motueka and was buried in Pioneer Park, Motueka.
