= Leonard Greenwood (classicist) =

Leonard Hugh Graham Greenwood (30 August 1880 – 16 November 1965) was a New Zealand classical scholar at Cambridge University.

== Biography ==
Greenwood was born in Gisborne, New Zealand to Graham Greenwood (1834-1917) and Isobel (née Martin). Greenwood's father, Graham Lord Greenwood, was the son of John Danforth Greenwood and the artist Sarah Greenwood.

He was educated at Christ's College, Christchurch, and King's College, Cambridge, where he graduated with a double first in classics. He then lectured at Leeds University 1903–1907 and was a fellow of King's College, Cambridge, 1906–1909. In 1909 he was elected to a fellowship at Emmanuel College, Cambridge, and taught classics there for 40 years. He died in Cambridge. He was elected a member of the Cambridge Apostles in 1903.

== Publications ==
- translation of Aristotle's Nicomachean ethics, book six, Cambridge University Press, 1909
- translation of Cicero's The Verrine Orations, Heinemann, 1935
- Greek tragedy compared with modern drama, Victoria University College, 1943
- Aspects of Euripidean Tragedy, Cambridge University Press, 1953
