= Sarah Greenwood (artist) =

Artist, letter-writer, teacher

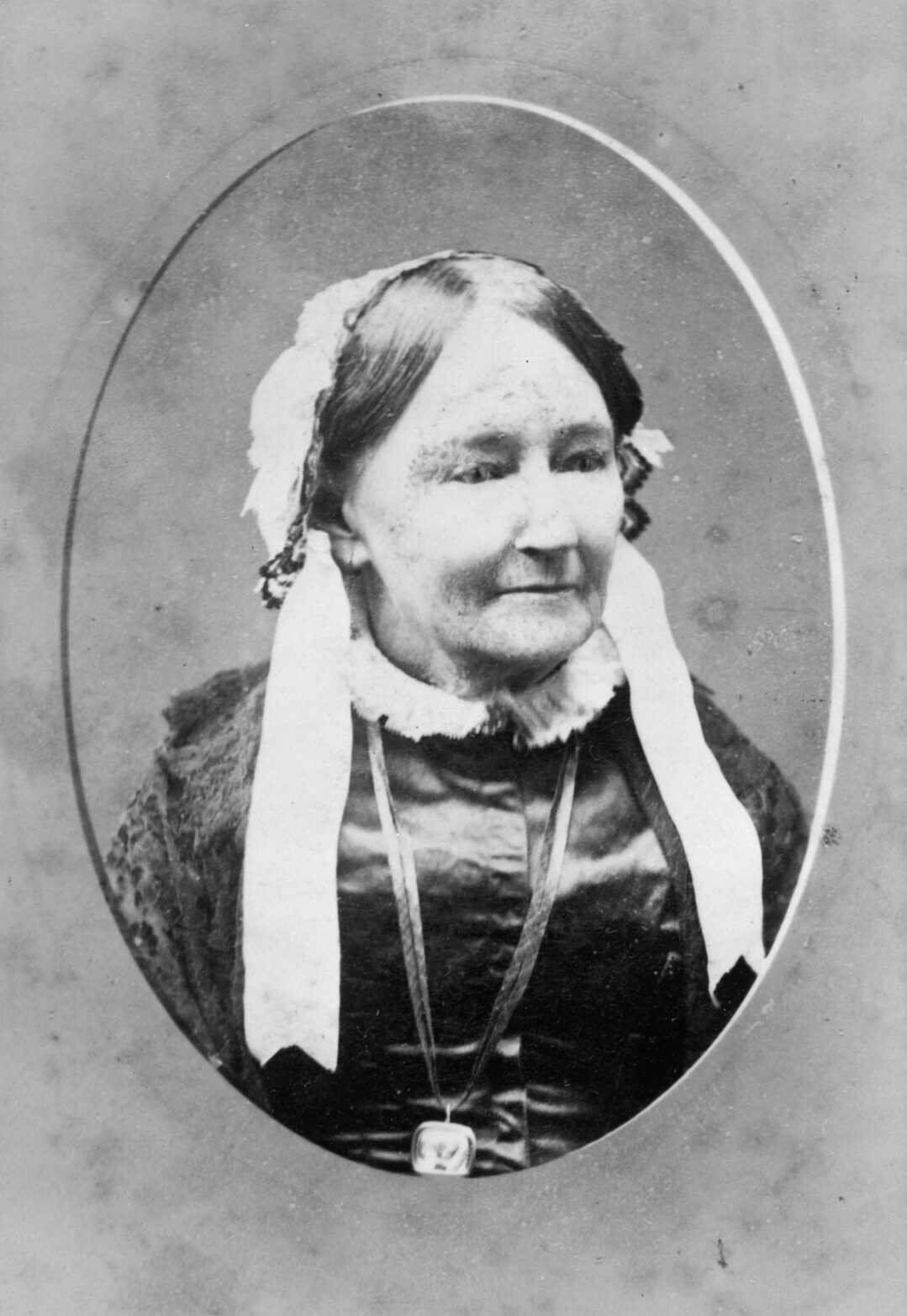
- Greenwood, c. 1880
- Born: Sarah Field c. 1809; Lambeth, Surrey, England
- Died: 13 December 1889 (aged 80); Motueka, New Zealand
- Spouse: John Danforth Greenwood (m. 1831)
- Children: 13
- Relatives: Ellen Greenwood (daughter); Jane Stowe (daughter); Elizabeth Greenwood (granddaughter); John D. H. Greenwood (grandson); Averil Lysaght (great-granddaughter); Leonard Greenwood (grandson); Mary Watt (great-granddaughter)

Sarah Greenwood (née Field; c. 1809 – 13 December 1889) was a New Zealand artist, letter-writer and teacher. Her letters and drawings of her experiences depict pioneer life in Nelson, where she lived for 46 years.

== Biography ==
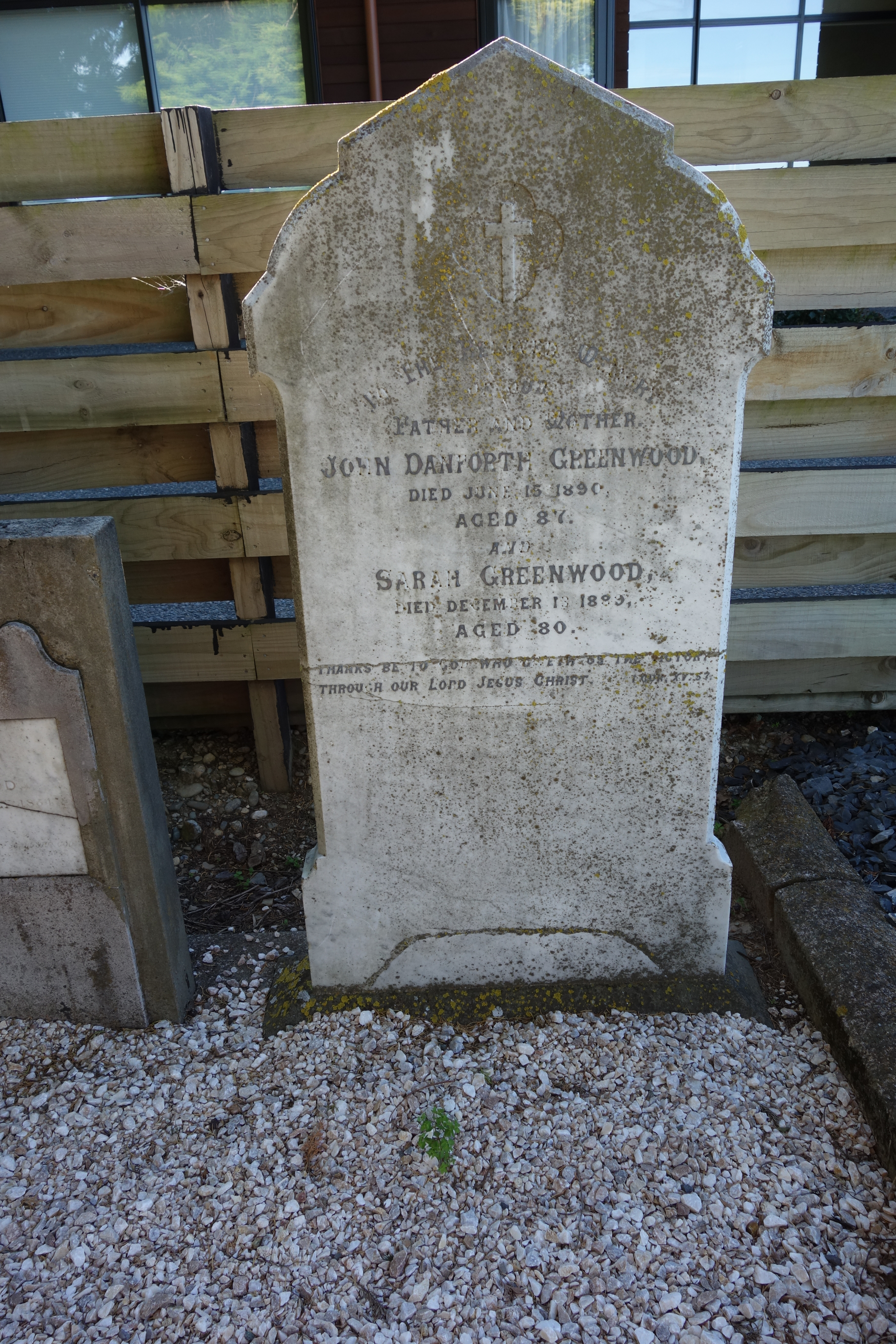
Greenwood's grave at Pioneer Park, Motueka

Greenwood was born in Lambeth, Surrey, England, in about 1809; she was the daughter of Mary Ann Jones and John Field. Her father was a wax chandler.

Greenwood's early education included the study of drawing, music, and languages, and she was later described by her friend Mary Hobhouse as "a clever active well educated woman". It is not known from where or whom she received her training in art. Her work and technique suggest that she did not draw from life and may have been taught by a lithographer.

She married John Danforth Greenwood (1803–1890), a physician and educationist originally from Sussex, in 1831. They had thirteen children, including Ellen Greenwood and Jane Greenwood. The family lived in London, England, and Charenton-le-Pont, near Paris, France, before emigrating to New Zealand in 1843. They settled in Motueka and built their house called "Woodlands".

Greenwood's husband had worked as ship's surgeon superintendent on the Phoebe en route to New Zealand in exchange for free passage for his family. A son, Albert, was born during the voyage. Four of the Greenwoods' daughters were born after their arrival in New Zealand. Greenwood's midwife was "delighted" to be paid for her attendance to a birth in second-hand clothing, demonstrating the realities of clothing supplies in the colony.

In the 1850s, Greenwood became involved in political and academic interests in Nelson and Wellington. Her daughter, Frances Mary Greenwood, married William Pharazyn (1842–1872), the son of politician Charles Johnson Pharazyn.

Greenwood became an artist, known for landscapes and portraits. She also ran a successful school on Bridge Street in Nelson between 1865 and 1868 with six of her daughters.

Greenwood retired to Motueka in 1877 and lived with her son Fred on the Grange. She died in Motueka on 13 December 1889, aged 80. Her husband died six months later.

== Legacy ==
Greenwood's descendants include Elizabeth Greenwood, Averil Lysaght and Muriel Mary Lysaght.

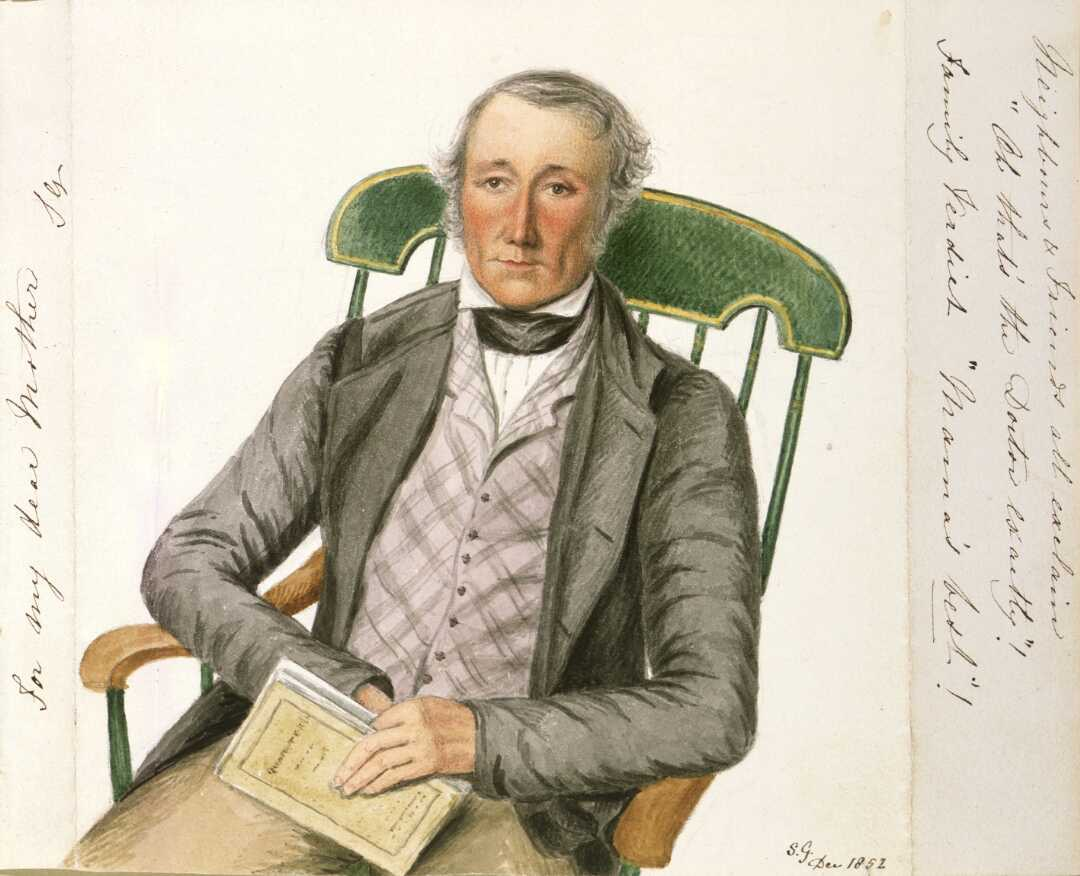
Greenwood, Sarah. Portrait of John Danforth Greenwood

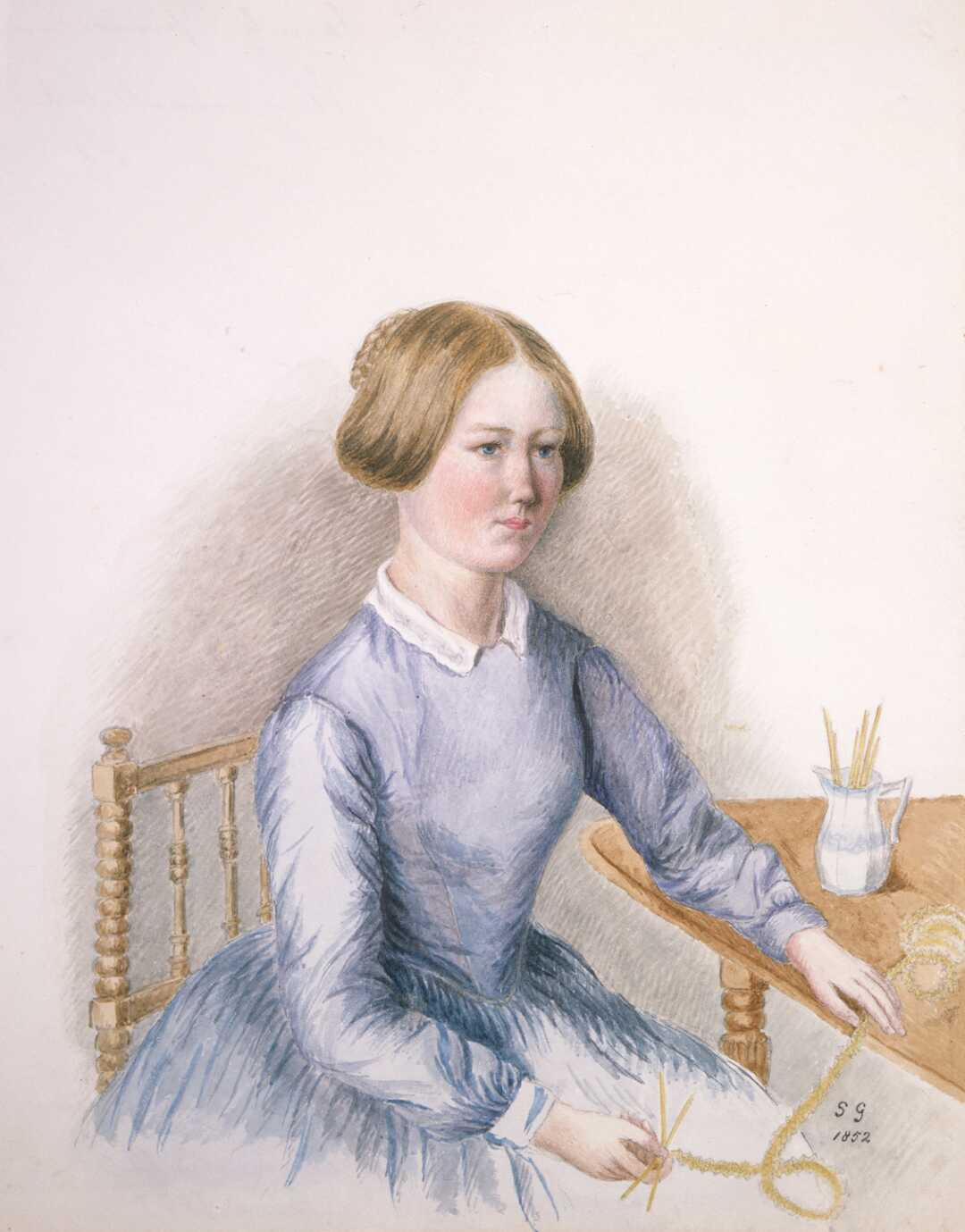
Greenwood, Sarah. Portrait of Jane Greenwood
