= Ellen Greenwood =

New Zealand teacher and social worker

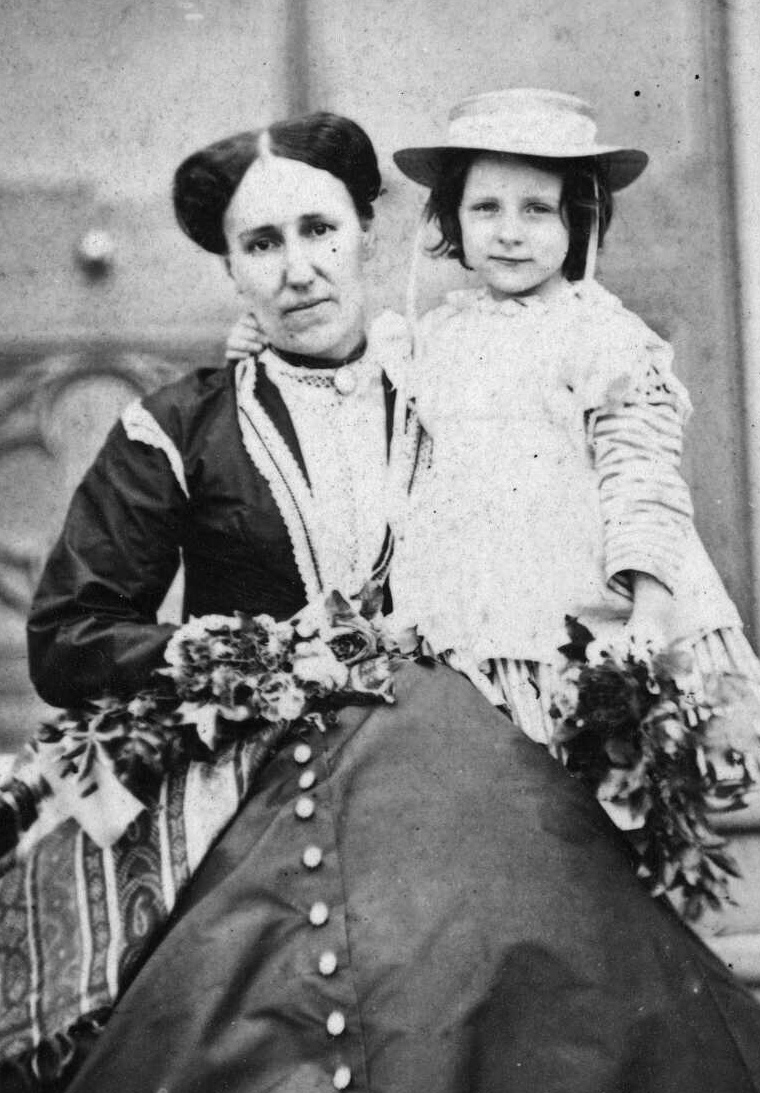
- c. 1861–1868
- Born: Ellen Sarah Greenwood; 19 February 1837; Mitcham, Surrey, England
- Died: 29 November 1917 (aged 80); Wellington, New Zealand
- Resting place: Karori Cemetery
- Occupations: Teacher; social worker
- Parents: Danforth Greenwood (father); Sarah Greenwood (mother)
- Relatives: Jane Stowe (sister); Elizabeth Greenwood (niece); Averil Lysaght (grandniece); John Greenwood (great-grandfather)

Ellen Sarah Greenwood (19 February 1837 – 29 November 1917) was a New Zealand teacher and social worker.

== Biography ==
She was born in Mitcham, Surrey, England, on 19 February 1837. She was the second daughter of John Danforth Greenwood and Sarah Greenwood (née Field).

From 1861 to 1868, she was the governess for Governor Thomas Gore Browne and his wife, Harriet Louisa Browne's children in Auckland and Tasmania. On her return in 1868, she, and her mother, set up a school Woodlands House in Nelson. In 1871, she joined her elder sister Mary in Wellington, on the Terrace, that had also set up a school. In Wellington, she opened her own day school in Taranaki Place.

In 1878, she was a founder member of the Wellington Ladies' Christian Association. In 1879, she established Alexandra Home for Friendless Women, Newtown. Women came from across New Zealand to learn domestic and parenting skills.

In 1883, Greenwood had closed her school in Taranaki Place and rejoined her sisters on the Terrace. The three Greenwood sisters, Ellen, Mary and Annie, retired in 1886, and they were presented with a bag of sovereigns by pupils and ex-pupils.

In 1896, she was a key part in the founding of the Levin Memorial Home for Girls, Berhampore. She was secretary of the Wellington Ladies' Christian Association from 1879 to 1899 and president from 1899 to 1916. She was president of both the Alexandra and Levin homes for several years until shortly before her death.

She died on 29 November 1917 and was buried in Karori Cemetery. There is also a memorial plaque for her at Old St Paul's Church in Wellington.
