= Sophia Augusta Moore =

New Zealand artist (1862–1945)

Sophia Augusta Moore (née Lysaght; 18 December 1861 - 26 March 1945) was a New Zealand artist. Her work is in the collections of the National Library of New Zealand and MTG Hawke's Bay. She was the mother of the artist John Lysaght Moore.

Lysaght was born on 18 December 1861 in Kirby Malzeard, Yorkshire. She was the daughter of Frances Charlotte (née Gardiner) and James Richard Lysaght. She was a direct descendant of Anne, Duchess of Exeter. Her great-great-great-great-grandfather was the brewer Sir Benjamin Truman. In 1874, Lysaght and her parents moved to Lyttelton, New Zealand, aboard the ship Crusader.

She married Francis Edward Moore, a grandson of Charles Montagu-Scott, 4th Duke of Buccleuch on 26 November 1884 at St Mary's Church, Hāwera. She died on 26 March 1945.
