= John P. Brophy =

Irish lawyer and professor (1842–1914)

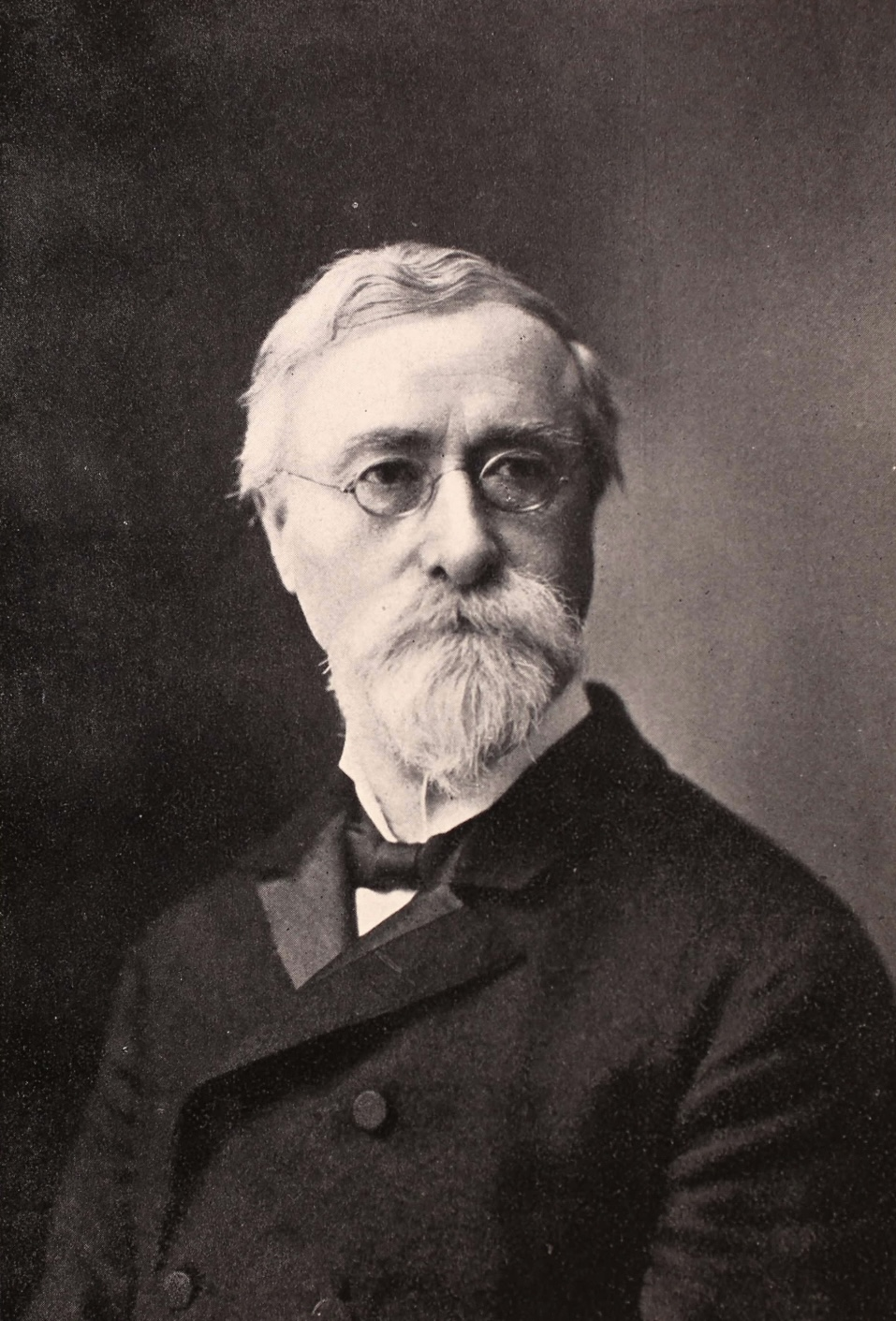
- Born: John Patrick Brophy; June 28, 1842; Dublin, Ireland
- Died: February 21, 1914 (aged 71); Manhattan, New York, US
- Occupations: lawyer and tutor
- Spouse: Elizabeth Warren Tyler (m. 1866)

John Patrick Brophy (June 28, 1842 - February 21, 1914) was an Irish-American professor and lawyer who had a minor role in trying to have Mary Surratt pardoned following the assassination of Abraham Lincoln.

== Personal life ==
Brophy married Elizabeth Warren Tyler on September 11, 1866, in Baltimore, Maryland and had 7 children during their marriage. Elizabeth was a great-niece of President John Tyler. After getting married, he moved to New York and became President of St. Louis College in 1870; he then later reinvented himself as an Assistant Deputy Clerk for the New York Supreme Court in 1898.

He was originally a teacher at Gonzaga College in Washington, D.C. right before becoming involved in the Surratt case

He also published an ancestral book about his wife's family including the relationship to President Tyler in 1911.

== Involvement in Mary Surratt case ==
Following the assassination of Abraham Lincoln, Brophy emerged in public discourse as a defender of Surratt's reputation. He was notable for many actions tied to her case. As a young man at the time, he kept trying to trace the steps of Booth's failed original plan to kidnap Lincoln. He knew Mary from her son, John. So when he went so see her in the arsenal, she asked Brophy to help clear her name. Brophy promised that he would help.

Brophy boarded at the Surratt residence during the Civil War and which was known as a close family friend to the Surratt family.

In the book 'The Catholics and Mrs. Mary Surratt' states that Brophy published and distributed a pamphlet to create sympathy for Surratt as a way to try and pardon her since there was no trial; it was called the "Amator Justitiae" which was released in June 1865.

On the morning of July 7, 1865, Brophy went to the White House with Anna Surratt, Charles Mason, and another unidentified female to beg to speak with President Andrew Johnson but were denied access. Also arriving at the White House was Adele Douglas, who was the wife of the late senator Stephen A. Douglas; she was able to speak to the president; it is unknown what was said, but it failed to change the president's mind about the hanging of Mary Surratt which was set to take place later that afternoon; when she returned, Brophy begged her to try again; she did but it was unsuccessful

One of Mary Surratt's last words were to Brophy, which she said "Goodbye, take care of Annie." Surratt also said to him, "Mr. Brophy, before God, I am innocent. I go to my death quietly, I know not why, but something tells me it is best. I die for the sake of American womanhood, and especially for the womanhood of the South, and I ask you to tell the world that I am innocent. Before God I swear it, and pray that he will keep his merciful hand over the innocent child whom I leave an orphan."

After Mary's death her daughter Anna would move in with the Brophy's and lived there for a short period of time

In 1908, Brophy broke his silence about Surratt and stated how she was innocent and that he was the only person who knew her dying wish.
