= Joseph Arnold (Rhode Island farmer) =

Colonist in British North America (1710–1776)

- Born: 16 September 1710 possibly Newport, Rhode Island
- Died: 29 August 1776 (aged 65) probably Exeter, Rhode Island
- Occupation: Deacon
- Spouses: Patience Gifford, Hannah Gifford
- Children: Abigail, Josiah, Joseph, Stephen, Samuel, Josiah, Patience, Mary, Peleg, Oliver, John, Caleb, Anna, Edmund, Dorcas, Hannah
- Parents: Samuel Arnold (father); Mary Sheffield (mother)
- Relatives: Grandfather: Attorney General Joseph Sheffield; great grandfather: Governor Benedict Arnold; great great grandson: Senator Stephen A. Douglas

Joseph Arnold (1710–1776) was a British colonist in the Colony of Rhode Island and Providence Plantations. He is most noted for having a very large progeny, having had 16 children of whom 15 grew to maturity, married, and had children of their own, giving him at least 93 grandchildren and 383 great grandchildren. He was the great great grandfather of presidential hopeful Stephen Arnold Douglas who debated Abraham Lincoln in 1858, and lost to him in the 1860 presidential election. He was an ancestral link between Douglas and many prominent early Rhode Islanders such as Governor Benedict Arnold and two founders of the Rhode Island colony, Samuel Wilbore and John Porter.

== Life ==
Born in 1710, probably in Portsmouth in the Colony of Rhode Island and Providence Plantations, Joseph Arnold was the son of Samuel Arnold and Mary Sheffield who were married in Newport, Rhode Island in 1708. The birth year of 1712 often ascribed to Arnold was likely from a confusion of dates created by some early writers. His father was a physician, as was his paternal grandfather, Caleb Arnold; his great grandfather, Benedict Arnold, became the first governor of the Rhode Island colony under the Royal Charter of 1663. His maternal grandfather was Rhode Island Attorney General Joseph Sheffield, for whom the subject was undoubtedly named. Arnold's mother likely died at an early age, since she had only three children, and never cosigned any land records with her husband.

Arnold was a farmer and landowner who lived in Exeter, Rhode Island, and this is where the births of many of his children were recorded. He left behind few records other than land transactions, but was called a Deacon in a family record, and was given the title of Esquire in his obituary. He is most noted for his very large progeny of 16 children, 93 grandchildren and at least 383 great grandchildren. His first wife was Patience Gifford, the daughter of Yelverton Gifford and Ann Northup, who bore two children, and then died, possibly in childbirth with her second child who did not survive. Arnold then married Hannah Gifford, the sister of Patience, and with her had 14 children, and all 15 of his surviving children married and had offspring. His second child with his second wife, Stephen Arnold, moved from Rhode Island to Stephentown, New York, and became the great grandfather of Stephen Arnold Douglas, who became famous as the leader of the Northern Democrats before the Civil War, sparring with Abraham Lincoln in a series of famed debates prior to a U.S. Senate contest in 1858, and later losing to Lincoln in the 1860 presidential election.

Arnold died on 29 August 1776 "of camp fever while visiting his sons in camp with his sister Mary." His death was recorded in the diary of Jeffrey Watson, one of his contemporaries. Three of his sons--Peleg, Caleb and Edmund--served in the military during the American Revolutionary War.

== Ancestry of Joseph Arnold ==
The three early generations of Joseph Arnold's ancestry are documented in John O. Austin's Genealogical Dictionary of Rhode Island. The connection between the Arnolds and the Sheffields was published by Katharine Waterman in 1953.

Ancestors of Joseph Arnold (Rhode Island farmer)

16. William Arnold (1587–1676)
8. Benedict Arnold (1615–1678)
17. Christian Peake (1584- c. 1659)
4. Caleb Arnold (1644–1719)
18. Stukely Westcott (1592–1677)
9. Damaris Westcott (1621 – after 1678)
19. Juliann Marchante (born c. 1600)
2. Samuel Arnold (c. 1677 – after 1752)
20. Samuel Wilbore (c.1595–1656)
10. Samuel Wilbur Jr. (1622–1697?)
21. Ann Smith
5. Abigail Wilbur (c.1646–1730)
22. John Porter (c.1605-after 1674)
11. Hannah Porter (died 1722)
23. Margaret (Lang) Odding
1. Joseph Arnold (1710–1776)
24. Edmund Sheffield
12. Icabod Sheffield (1630–1712)
25. Thomazin
6. Joseph Sheffield (1661–1706)
26. George Parker (1611–1656)
13. Mary Parker (born c. 1640)
27. Frances (died after 1669)
3. Mary Sheffield (born 1687)
14. Thomas Sheriff (died 1675)
7. Mary Sheriff (died after 1706)
15. Martha (died after 1691)

== See also ==
- Stephen A. Douglas ancestry
