= Joseph Sheffield =

Inhabitant of Portsmouth in the Colony of Rhode Island

27th Attorney General of Rhode Island
- In office 1704–1706
- Governor: Samuel Cranston
- Preceded by: Nathaniel Dyre
- Succeeded by: Simon Smith

Personal details
- Born: 22 August 1661 Portsmouth, Rhode Island
- Died: February 1706 (aged 44) Portsmouth, Rhode Island
- Spouse: Mary Sheriff
- Children: Joseph, Mary, Elizabeth, Benjamin, Edmund, William, Elizabeth
- Parent(s): Ichabod Sheffield and Mary Parker
- Education: considerable, based on his committee positions and selection as Attorney General
- Occupation: Deputy, Assistant, Attorney General

Joseph Sheffield (1661–1706) was a resident of Portsmouth in the Colony of Rhode Island and Providence Plantations during the late 17th century. He held several significant public offices within the colony, including Deputy, Assistant, and Attorney General. Sheffield was twice appointed as Rhode Island’s agent to England, although he never appears to have served in that capacity due to the indecision of the General Assembly. He was actively involved in colonial governance during a period when Rhode Island faced potential revocation of its Royal Charter as a result of “irregularities” cited by the English Board of Trade. Sheffield died in 1706 at the age of forty-four, leaving a widow and several minor children.

== Life ==
Born in Portsmouth, Rhode Island on 22 August 1661, Joseph Sheffield was the son of Ichabod Sheffield and Mary Parker. His father had been baptized 23 December 1630 in St. Peter's in Sudbury, Suffolk, England, the son of Edmund and Thomazin Sheffield. After living in Portsmouth, his father moved to Dover, New Hampshire, but returned to Newport, Rhode Island, and was buried in the Clifton Burying Ground there.

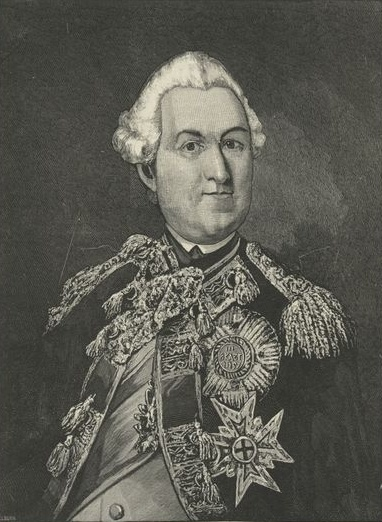
Lord Bellomont was bent on removing Rhode Island from its chartered government for "irregularites," some of which were addressed in letters which Sheffield helped draft.

Joseph Sheffield is first found in the public record in 1684 when he was made a freeman of the colony, at the age of 23. He first began his public service 12 years later when he was selected as both a Deputy and an Assistant under Governor Samuel Cranston, serving in the latter role for seven years between 1696 and 1705. Sheffield was active during a critical time in Rhode Island's history, when the colony was being accused of numerous irregularities, and when it came the closest to losing its broad freedoms under the Royal Charter of 1663. The colony's irregularities were being feverishly documented by Lord Bellomont, who had collected volumes of documentary evidence. The feeling of the home government was expressed in a letter of August 1699 written by the Board of Trade in reply to a letter written by Governor Cranston in May. The language was very severe, blaming the colony, among other things, for sending only an abstract of the laws when a full copy was required. To address this deficiency, in October 1699 Sheffield and six others were appointed to make returns of the laws to satisfy the Earl of Bellomont's requests. In December 1699 a fair copy of the laws and acts of the colony was finally sent to the Earl, with a letter explaining the delay. Joseph Sheffield, as one of the Assistants, carried the letter with the purpose of being an envoy to soothe Bellomont's anger.

In February 1700, Rhode Island's agent in England, Jaleel Brenton, was likely becoming overwhelmed with his responsibilities, and Sheffield was appointed as a second colonial agent. Three months later, however, the General Assembly decided that one agent in England was sufficient, so Sheffield remained in Rhode Island. Again in February 1703, with Brenton no longer in England, Sheffield was appointed as the colony's sole agent to England, and again, two months later, the Assembly saw no need for an agent there, and the appointment was delayed until the May meeting, at which time it was dropped from consideration.

Another irregularity that concerned The Board of Trade in London was the extraordinary militia power of the Rhode Island colony, though this power had been conferred by the colony's charter In 1702 Governor Joseph Dudley of Massachusetts visited Newport, claiming to act under the authority of the King as "Captain-General of all forces, forts, and places of strength." He demanded a review of the colonial militia, which was denied by Governor Cranston. In September 1702, Sheffield was appointed to a committee to draw up an address to the queen related to the colony's military forces.

Using his experience of transcribing the laws of the colony, Sheffield and two others were appointed to draw up the methods and proceedings of the Court of Common Pleas in June 1703, and two years later he was on a committee to transcribe and print the laws of the colony. In 1704 he was chosen as the Attorney General for the colony, and held this position for two years, until his untimely death in February 1706. His will, written on 3 February and proved 15 days later, named his wife Mary as executrix, and named his children, who were all minors at the time.

== Family ==
Joseph Sheffield's wife was Mary Sheriff, the daughter of Thomas and Martha Sheriff of Portsmouth. Following the death of Mary's father, her mother married Thomas Hazard, one of the founding settlers of Newport. Of Sheffield's children, his oldest daughter, Mary, married Samuel Arnold, a physician, the son of Caleb Arnold, also a physician, and the grandson of the first Governor of the Rhode Island colony, Benedict Arnold. A notable descendant of Joseph and Mary Sheffield, through their grandson, Joseph Arnold, was Stephen Arnold Douglas who debated Abraham Lincoln in 1858 before a senate race and later lost to him in the 1860 presidential election.

== See also ==
- List of early settlers of Rhode Island
- Colony of Rhode Island and Providence Plantations
- For his ancestry, see Joseph Arnold
