= Stephen A. Douglas Tomb =

United States historic site in Chicago, Illinois

- Douglas Tomb State Memorial
- U.S. National Register of Historic Places
- Illinois State Historic Site
- Chicago Landmark
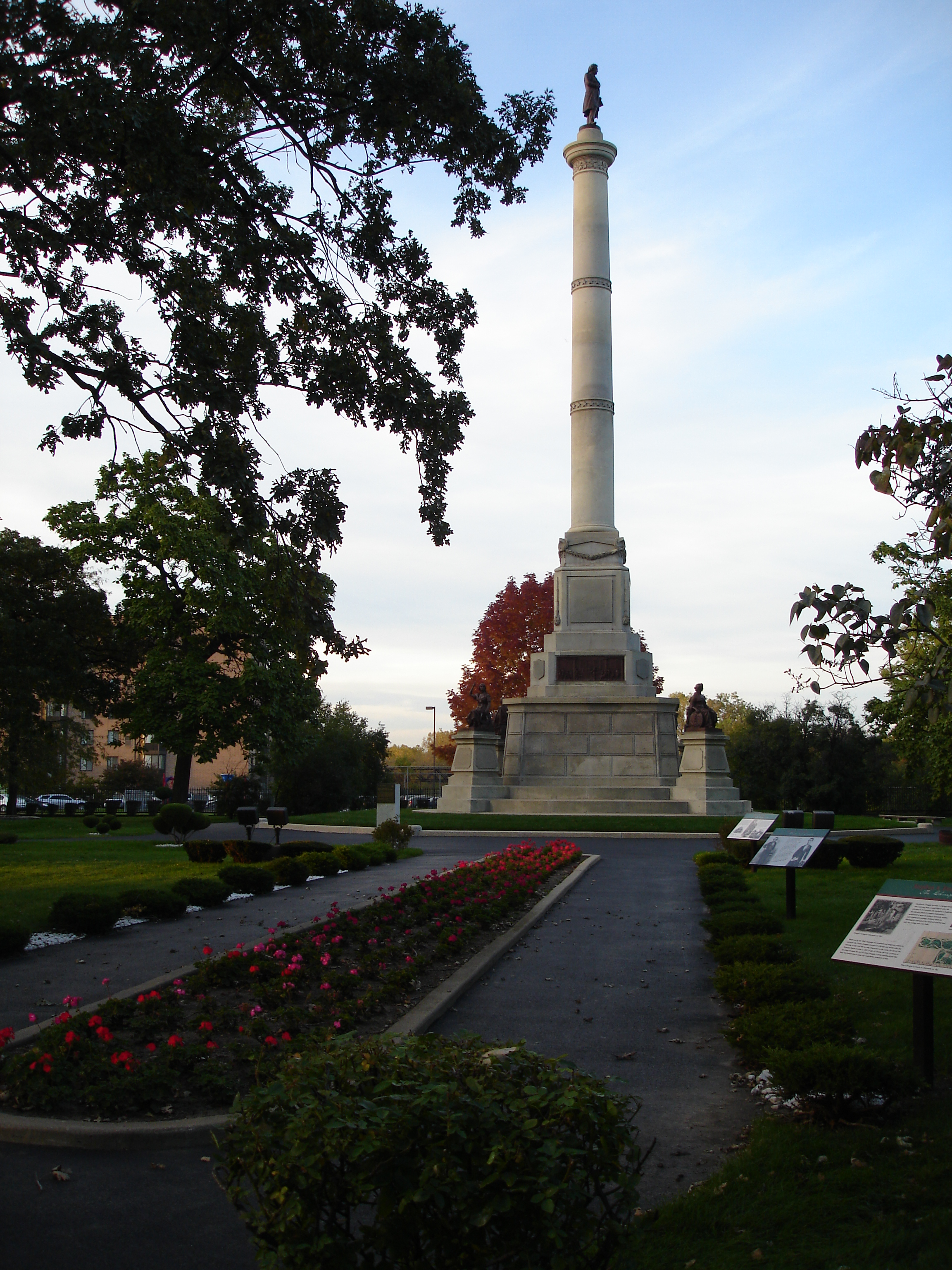
- Location: 636 E. 35th Street; Chicago, Illinois 60616
- Coordinates: 41°49′53.93″N 87°36′30.44″W
- Built: 1881 (completed)
- Architect: Leonard W. Volk
- NRHP reference No.: 76000689

Significant dates
- Added to NRHP: May 28, 1976
- Designated CHICL: September 28, 1977

The Stephen A. Douglas Tomb and Memorial or Stephen Douglas Monument Park is a memorial that includes the tomb of United States Senator Stephen A. Douglas (1813–1861). It is located at 636 E. 35th Street in the Bronzeville neighborhood of Chicago, Illinois (part of the city's Douglas community), near the site of Camp Douglas. The land was originally owned by Douglas’ estate but was sold to the state of Illinois, when it became known as “Camp Douglas,” serving first as training grounds for Union soldiers during the Civil War, then as a prisoner of war camp.

The memorial is a 96-foot granite structure comprising three circular bases and a 20-foot diameter octagonal mausoleum which holds Douglas’ sarcophagus. Large bronze allegorical figures portraying “Illinois,” “History,” “Justice,” and “Eloquence” are positioned at the four main corners of the mausoleum. Four bas-reliefs in the panels of the main base depict the advance of American civilization. A ten-foot statue of Douglas stands atop a 46 ft column of white marble from his native state, Vermont.

Douglas, best remembered for debating Abraham Lincoln over slavery, died from typhoid fever on June 3, 1861 in Chicago, where he was buried on the shore of Lake Michigan. Immediately after his death an association of notable Chicagoans was formed to oversee the construction of a suitable tomb and monument, but its members failed to raise sufficient funds. In 1865 the state of Illinois purchased the tomb from Douglas' widow, Adele Douglas, for $25,000. On June 3, 1868, Douglas' body was placed in the completed portion of the tomb. Leonard Volk, a relative of Douglas by marriage, designed the tomb and monument. In 1871 the Great Chicago Fire destroyed Volk's plans for the unfinished structure. The tomb was completed in May 1881, after an expense of $90,000.

The memorial was designated a Chicago Landmark on September 28, 1977. The tomb is maintained by the Illinois Historic Preservation Agency as a state historic site.

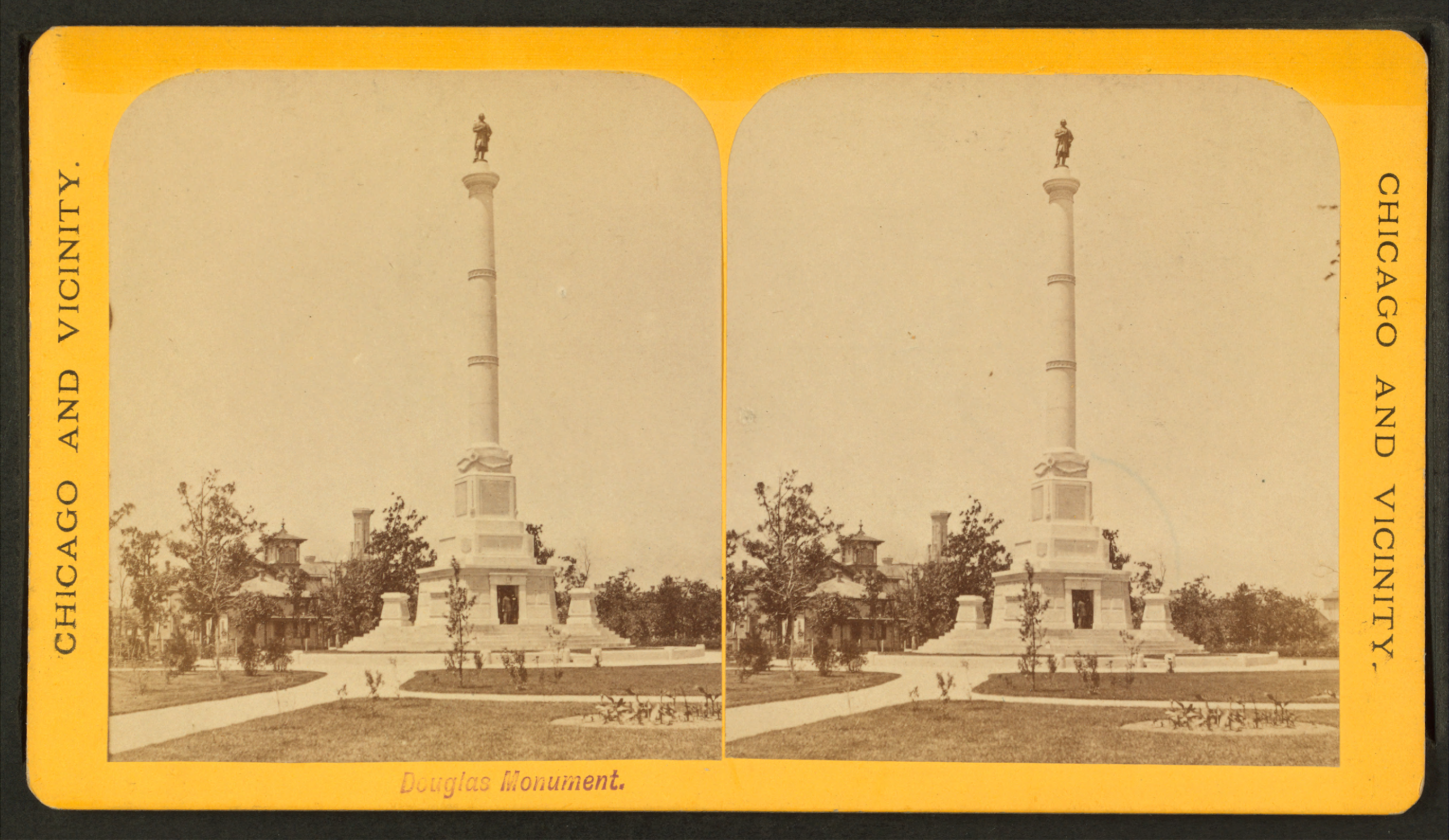
Douglas monument from Robert N. Dennis collection of stereoscopic views
