= John Brophy =

John Brophy may refer to:

- John Brophy (ice hockey) (1933–2016), Canadian hockey coach and player
- John Brophy (labor) (1883–1963), United Mine Workers and CIO leader
- John Brophy (writer) (1899–1965), Anglo-Irish soldier and novelist who wrote The Day They Robbed the Bank of England, The World Went Mad
- John C. Brophy (1901–1976), U.S. Representative from Wisconsin
- John P. Brophy (1842-1914), Lawyer, professor; who tried to help Mary Surratt with the Abraham Lincoln case
