= Stephen A. Douglas =

American politician and lawyer (1813–1861)

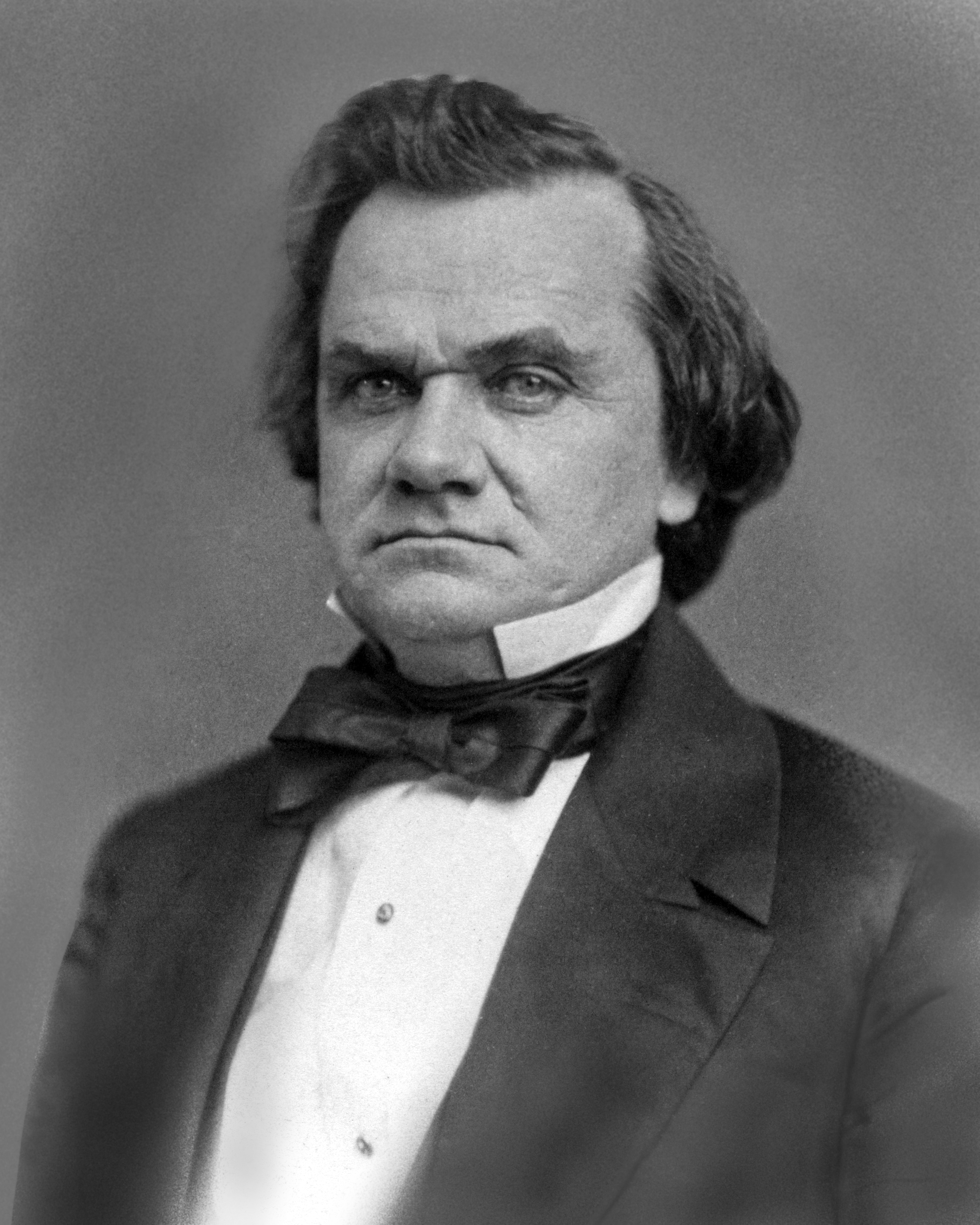
- Portrait by Julian Vannerson, 1859

United States Senator from Illinois
- In office March 4, 1847 – June 3, 1861
- Preceded by: James Semple
- Succeeded by: Orville H. Browning

Member of the U.S. House of Representatives from Illinois's 5th district
- In office December 5, 1843 – March 3, 1847
- Preceded by: Constituency established
- Succeeded by: William Richardson

Associate Justice of the Supreme Court of Illinois
- In office February 15, 1841 – June 28, 1843
- Preceded by: Seat established
- Succeeded by: James Shields

7th Secretary of State of Illinois
- In office November 30, 1840 – February 15, 1841
- Governor: Thomas Carlin
- Preceded by: Alexander P. Field
- Succeeded by: Lyman Trumbull

Personal details
- Born: Stephen Arnold Douglass; April 23, 1813 Brandon, Vermont, U.S.
- Died: June 3, 1861 (aged 48) Chicago, Illinois, U.S.
- Resting place: Stephen A. Douglas Tomb, Chicago
- Party: Democratic
- Spouses: Martha Martin (m. 1847; died 1853); Adele Cutts (m. 1856)
- Children: 4
- Nickname: "Little Giant"

Stephen Arnold Douglas (né Douglass; April 23, 1813 – June 3, 1861) was an American politician and lawyer from Illinois. A Democrat, he served in the United States Senate for fourteen years and defeated Abraham Lincoln to win reelection in 1858, a campaign known for the pivotal Lincoln–Douglas debates. He was the representative of the Northern Democrats in the 1860 United States presidential election; with the Democrats split between northern and southern factions in the leadup to the American Civil War, he was defeated by Lincoln, the Republican nominee. During his senate career, Douglas was one of the brokers of the Compromise of 1850, which sought to avert a sectional crisis over the issue of slavery. To deal with the volatile issue of whether to extend slavery into US territories, Douglas became the foremost advocate of popular sovereignty, which held that the voters of each territory should be allowed to decide. At just 5 feet 4 inches (1.63 m) tall, Douglas was nicknamed the "Little Giant" because he was short in physical stature but a forceful and dominant figure in politics.

Born in Brandon, Vermont, Douglas migrated to Jacksonville, Illinois, in 1833 to establish a legal practice. He experienced early success in politics as a member of the newly formed Democratic Party, serving in the Illinois House of Representatives and various other positions. He was appointed to the Supreme Court of Illinois in 1841. In 1843, he was elected to the U.S. House of Representatives. Douglas became an ally of President James K. Polk and favored Texas annexation and US involvement in the Mexican–American War. He was one of four Northern Democrats in the House to vote against the Wilmot Proviso, which would have banned slavery in any territory acquired from Mexico.

The Illinois legislature elected Douglas to the U.S. Senate in 1847, and he emerged as a national leader during the 1850s. Along with Senator Henry Clay of the Whig Party, he led the effort to pass the Compromise of 1850, which attempted to settle the slavery issues that arose after the Mexican–American War. Douglas was a candidate for president at the 1852 Democratic National Convention but lost the nomination to Franklin Pierce, who won the election. Seeking to open western territories for expansion, Douglas introduced the Kansas–Nebraska Act in 1854. Though Douglas had hoped the act would ease sectional tensions, it helped fuel the rise of the anti-slavery Republican Party. Douglas once again sought the presidency in 1856, but the Democratic convention nominated James Buchanan, who went on to win the election. Buchanan and Douglas split over the admission of Kansas as a slave state, and Douglas helped block admission, accusing the pro-slavery Kansas legislature of conducting an illegitimate election. Kansas eventually came into the Union as a free state.

During the Lincoln–Douglas debates, Douglas articulated the Freeport Doctrine, which held that territories could effectively exclude slavery despite the Supreme Court's ruling in the 1857 case of Dred Scott v. Sandford. Disagreements over slavery led Southern delegates to bolt from the 1860 Democratic National Convention. The rump convention of Northern delegates nominated Douglas for president, while Southern Democrats threw their support behind John C. Breckinridge, Buchanan's vice president. In the 1860 election, Lincoln and Douglas were the main candidates in the North, while most Southerners supported either Breckinridge or John Bell of the Constitutional Union Party. Campaigning throughout the country, North and South, during the election, Douglas warned of the dangers of secession and urged audiences to stay loyal to the United States. Lincoln's strong support in the North led to his victory. After the Battle of Fort Sumter at the start of the Civil War, Douglas rallied support for the Union, but he died in June 1861.

== Early life and education ==
He was born Stephen Arnold Douglass in Brandon, Vermont, on April 23, 1813, the son of physician Stephen Arnold Douglass and Sarah (Fisk) Douglass. Douglas had an older sister, Sarah, who was called Sally. According to historian Martin H. Quitt, the younger Douglas dropped the second "s" from his name in 1846, the year after publication of Frederick Douglass's first autobiography. However, historian Reg Ankrom wrote that Douglas spelled his surname with one "s" as early as 1839. Douglas's paternal ancestors had migrated to New England in the 17th century, and his paternal grandfather, Benajah Douglass, served several terms in the Vermont House of Representatives. Douglas's father died of a stroke on July 1, 1813, as he cradled two-month-old Douglas.

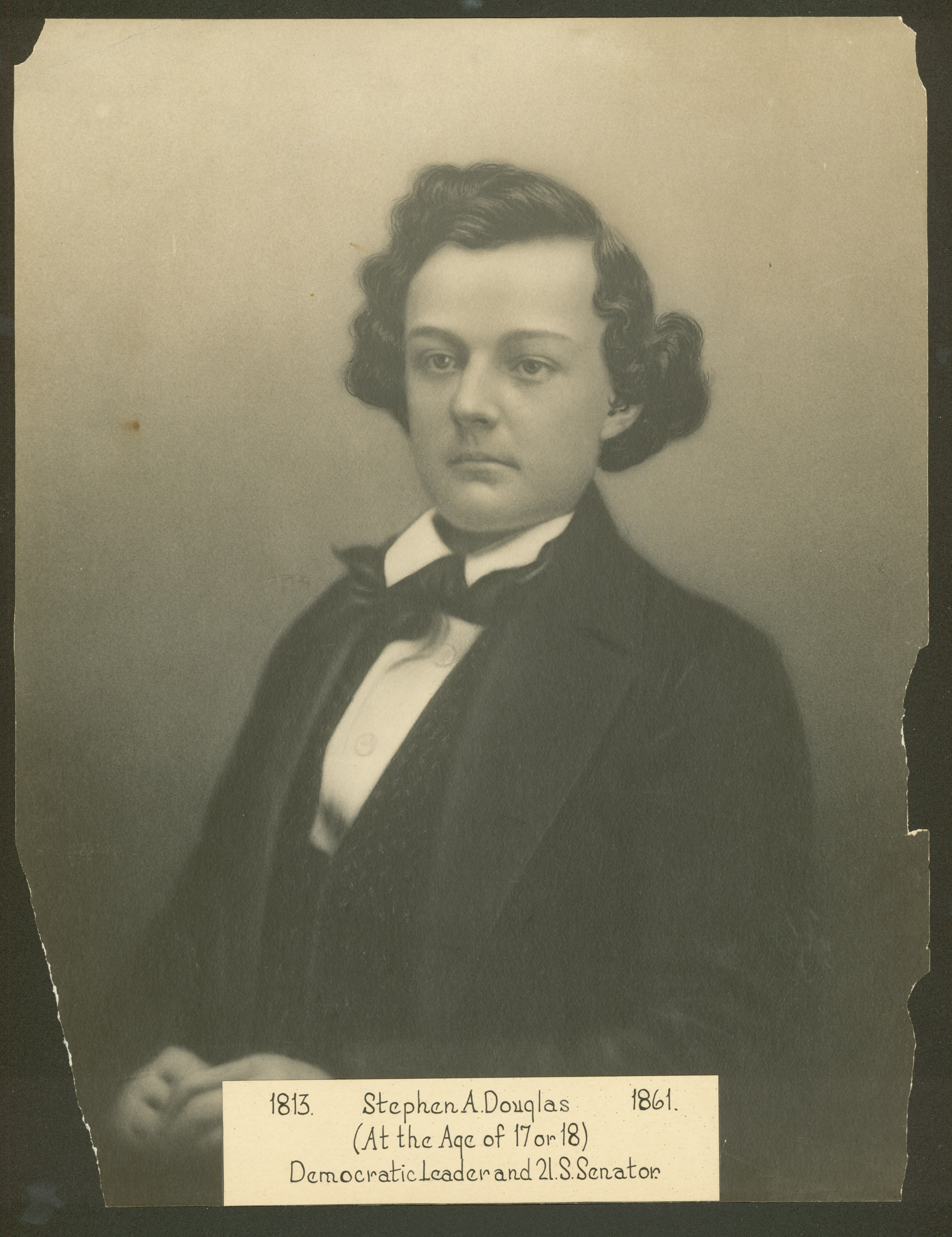
Douglas at the age of 17 or 18

Douglas, his mother, and his sister moved to the farm three miles north of Brandon that his mother and her brother Edward inherited from Douglas's father. On the farm, Douglas was responsible for chores including chopping wood and removing rocks from the land. During the winter, he received an elementary education at the Brandon District School. As a teenager, Douglas left the family farm for Middlebury and apprenticed himself to cabinetmaker Nahum Parker. He began reading political literature and engaging in discussions with his employer and other young men. Douglas enjoyed carpentry: "I have never been placed in any situation ... which I enjoyed to so great an extent as the cabinet shop". He returned to Brandon after he grew dissatisfied with Parker, who expected him to do housework. He began an apprenticeship with Brandon cabinetmaker Deacon Caleb Knowlton, but quit after falling ill in 1829.

Douglas moved back to the farm and enrolled at Brandon Academy, where he became a member of the debate club. On February 14, 1830, his sister married Julius N. Granger, a resident of Ontario County, New York; later that year, Douglas's mother married Granger's father, Gehazi. The whole family then relocated to the Granger farm in Clifton Springs, New York and Douglas continued his education at nearby Canandaigua Academy. He came to admire Andrew Jackson and Thomas Jefferson's ideas informed Douglas's political views; in debates with his peers he consistently argued for states' rights and limited government. He frequently gave speeches supporting Jackson and the Democratic Party, and his oratory caused his peers to esteem him more than any other student.

== Early ventures ==
In January 1833, Douglas began to study law with attorneys Levi and Walter Hubbell. While clerking for the Hubbells, Douglas became friendly with Henry B. Payne, who was studying law at the nearby office of John C. Spencer. He was eager to begin his career and by June 1833, he recognized that if he stayed in New York or returned to Vermont, he would have to wait four years for admission to the bar. He decided to move west despite the protests of his mother, who feared a move would worsen his fragile health; she relented and gave him a small amount of money to facilitate his travels.

After a short stay in Buffalo, New York, and a visit to Niagara Falls, Douglas took a steamboat to Cleveland, Ohio. He initially hoped to establish himself in Cleveland, knowing that it would take him only a year to gain admission to the Ohio bar. Prosecutor Sherlock J. Andrews accepted Douglas as a clerk, but just five days later he was stricken with typhoid, and he was ill for four months. Henry Payne arrived in Cleveland soon after Douglas, and he took on the task of nursing Douglas back to health. After paying his medical and lodging bills with money his mother sent while he was ill, Douglas had forty dollars, which he used to continue traveling west.

Douglas took a canal boat from Cleveland to Portsmouth, Ohio, then traveled on to Cincinnati, Louisville, and St. Louis. Finding no opportunity in any of these cities, and almost out of cash, he decided his future lay in a small country town, so he moved to Jacksonville, Illinois. In Jacksonville, Douglas befriended attorney Murray McConnel, who advised Douglas to start a law practice in Pekin, which McConnel believed was destined to become a major shipping hub. With law books gifted by McConnel to replace the ones he had sold, Douglas waited in Meredosia for a steamboat to take him to Pekin. After a week, he learned the only boat that traveled this route had blown up in Alton.

Out of money, Douglas attempted to start a subscription school in the village of Exeter. He was unsuccessful, but Exeter's residents informed him that a school in Winchester stood a better chance of success. Douglas made the ten mile trip on foot and befriended shopkeeper Edward Griffith Miner, who allowed Douglas to live in his storeroom. Douglas enrolled 39 children for a three-month term and taught from December 1833 to February 1834.

His finances stabilized, in March 1834 Douglas received a license to practice law. He attempted to gain employment with Jacksonville attorney Josiah Lamborn; Lamborn was still bitter over losing a debate to Douglas during Douglas's earlier residence in Jacksonville and declined to hire him. Jacksonville was the county seat of Morgan County, which was then sparsely populated. Douglas began to speculate in Morgan County land; his holdings grew to include thousands of acres throughout the state. By 1836, he possessed 700 acres in Cass County alone.

== Early career ==
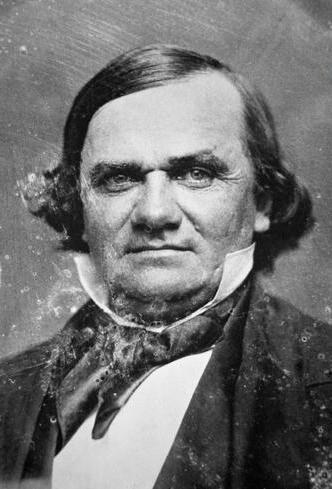
Stephen A. Douglas

=== Lawyer ===
Douglas was admitted to the bar on March 4, 1834. To his family, he wrote, "I have become a Western man, have imbibed Western feelings, principles, and interests and have selected Illinois as the favorite place of my adoption." Douglas's friend and biographer, Henry M. Flint, wrote that Douglas was a successful lawyer who showed "tact and skill in the examination of witnesses", "never went into court with a case until he thoroughly understood it", gave "plain and clear statements" in his addresses to juries in an "earnest and impassive" manner and "rarely failed to enlist the feelings and sympathies of a jury". Douglas became aligned with the "whole hog" Democrats, who strongly supported President Jackson.

In 1834, Douglas ran against incumbent John J. Hardin for state's attorney of the First District, which encompassed eight counties in western Illinois. Douglas won the position, which paid $250 a year (about $8,200 in 2025); this supplemented the $350 in legal fees he earned (about $11,500 in 2025). As a prosecutor, he was described by detractors as likely "to bluff, to turn facts, to distort evidence" while presenting cases.

=== Illinois politician ===
Douglas chose to focus on politics rather than law. He helped arrange the first-ever state Democratic convention in late 1835, and the convention pledged to support Jackson's chosen successor, Martin Van Buren, in the 1836 presidential election. In 1836, Douglas won election to the Illinois House of Representatives, defeating Hardin, the Whig nominee. Douglas joined a legislature that included five future senators, seven future congressmen, and one future president: Abraham Lincoln, who was a Whig. Unlike most Democrats, who favored limited government, Douglas generally supported public works projects, but thought the Whig-controlled legislature was eager to enact too many at once; he proposed an unsuccessful resolution in December 1836 that would have permitted the legislature's Committee on Internal Improvements to carry out only five of the many projects it had planned. While continuing to serve in the legislature and as state's attorney, Douglas was appointed by President Van Buren as registrar of the Springfield Land Office. This position earned him $3,000 a year (about $98,500 in 2025).

Douglas sought election to the United States House of Representatives in 1838, but lost by a 36-vote margin to Whig John T. Stuart. During the presidential election of 1840, Douglas campaigned throughout the state for Van Buren, and he frequently debated with Lincoln and other Whigs. Though Van Buren lost to Whig William Henry Harrison, Illinois was one of seven states to vote for Van Buren. After the election, Governor Thomas Carlin appointed Douglas Illinois Secretary of State, making Douglas the youngest individual to hold the post. During his brief tenure, Douglas helped arrange a municipal charter for the Mormon settlement of Nauvoo.

In 1841, Douglas spearheaded legislation that expanded the Illinois Supreme Court from four justices to nine. Justices were appointed by the state legislature, which was now controlled by Democrats; this allowed them to transform the composition of the court from a 3–1 Whig majority to a 6–3 Democratic one. Douglas accepted appointment to one of these newly created judgeships and served until June 1843, when he resigned in order to serve in the US House.

=== U.S. House of Representatives ===
In 1842 Douglas campaigned to replace Richard M. Young in the US Senate but lost the December vote to Sidney Breese. However, new congressional districts had been created after an influx of immigrants increased the state's population. Elections to fill the new seats were scheduled for August 1843, and Douglas ran against Whig Orville Hickman Browning in the 5th district. In May he was opposed by the Quincy Daily Whig newspaper for having supposedly made a politically charged ruling, and he was accused in June by the same newspaper of tax evasion and of continuing to take his judge's salary after resigning from the bench. Douglas debated Browning in towns across the district; they frequently travelled together and shared lodgings. Douglas won the August 7 election, 8,641 votes to 8,180, a margin that was "the narrowest ... in any Illinois congressional contest that year". He took office on December 5, 1843, at the start of the first session of the 28th Congress.

After winning re-election in August 1844, Douglas campaigned for James K. Polk in that year's presidential election. During one of his first campaign appearances outside of Illinois, Douglas denounced high tariff rates, saying that they constituted "an act for the oppression and plunder of the American laborer for the benefit of a few large capitalists". Polk narrowly defeated Whig Henry Clay. After Polk took office, Douglas strongly supported Texas annexation, and in May 1846 he voted to declare war on Mexico after US and Mexican forces clashed near the Rio Grande River. Douglas considered volunteering for military service, but Polk convinced him to remain in Congress and advocate for Polk's policies. Douglas was one of four Northern Democrats to vote against the Wilmot Proviso, which would have banned slavery in any land ceded by Mexico. Douglas instead favored extending to all US territories the Missouri Compromise Line, which banned slavery above latitude 36°30′ north, except for Missouri, and permitted slavery below it, but his proposal was defeated by anti-slavery Northern congressmen. Despite his opposition to tariffs, he voted against the Walker Tariff, which significantly lowered existing rates.

== Senator ==
=== Early years ===
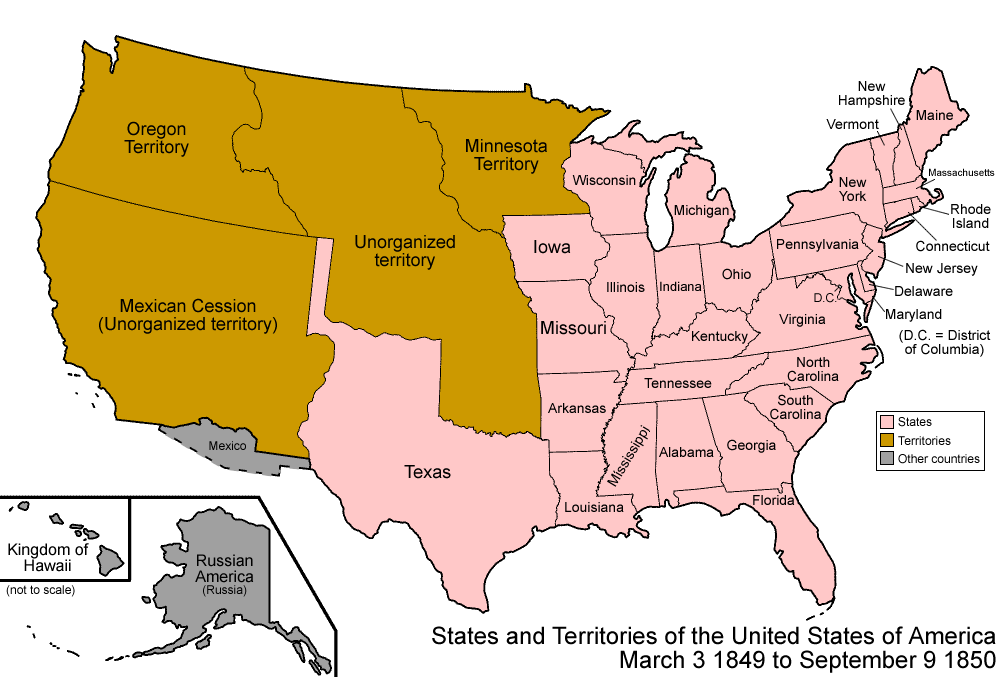
The United States in 1849, with Texas's land claims on New Mexico shown

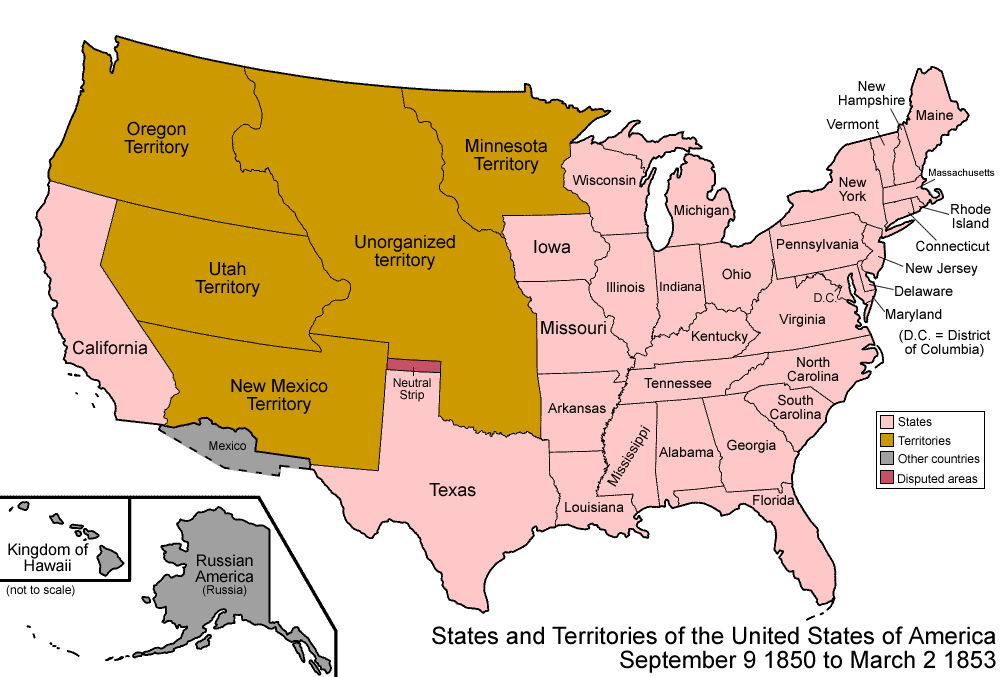
The United States after the Compromise of 1850

Douglas was re-elected to the US House in 1846, but in 1847 the legislature elected him to the US Senate and his term started on March 4. The US defeated Mexico in the Mexican–American War and acquired the Mexican Cession in the 1848 Treaty of Guadalupe Hidalgo. After the war, Douglas attempted to avoid the debate over the Wilmot Proviso by immediately admitting the territory acquired from Mexico as one single, huge state. His proposal would have allowed the inhabitants to determine the status of slavery themselves, but Northerners and Southerners alike rejected the plan.

In 1850, Senator Henry Clay introduced a multi-part proposal to admit California as a free state, establish the New Mexico and Utah territories, ban the slave trade in the District of Columbia, and pass a more stringent fugitive slave law. The proposal, which formed the basis of the Compromise of 1850, also required Texas to cede its claims on New Mexico in return for federal assumption of Texas's debts. After the bill's apparent collapse, Clay took a temporary leave from the Senate, and Douglas took the lead in advocating for Clay's compromise. Rather than passing the proposals as one bill, Douglas sought to pass each proposal one-by-one. The compromise faced strong opposition from Northerners like William Seward, who favored the Wilmot Proviso and attacked the fugitive slave provision, and Southerners like John C. Calhoun, who opposed the creation of new free states. With the help of President Millard Fillmore, Douglas put together a bipartisan coalition of Whigs and Democrats that passed it in the Senate. Douglas's lobbying helped ensure that the compromise also passed the House of Representatives and Fillmore signed it into law.

Douglas's role in passing the compromise gave him national stature, and he enjoyed the support of the Young America movement, which favored westward expansion. Douglas helped pass a bill granting rights-of-way to the Illinois Central Railroad, which would connect Chicago to Mobile, Alabama. He envisioned a transcontinental country connected by railroads and waterways, with Illinois serving as the gateway to the West. "There is a power in this nation greater than either the North or the South ... that power is the country known as the great West," he stated. Though he publicly denied interest in running for president in 1852, Douglas worked behind the scenes to build support. The 1852 Democratic National Convention held several presidential ballots, with delegates split between Douglas, James Buchanan, Lewis Cass of Michigan, and William L. Marcy. None of the major candidates obtained the required two-thirds majority, and on the 49th ballot the convention nominated a dark horse, Franklin Pierce. Despite his disappointment, Douglas campaigned for Pierce across the Midwest. Pierce went on to defeat Whig Winfield Scott in the general election, while Douglas won re-election to the Senate.

=== Pierce administration ===
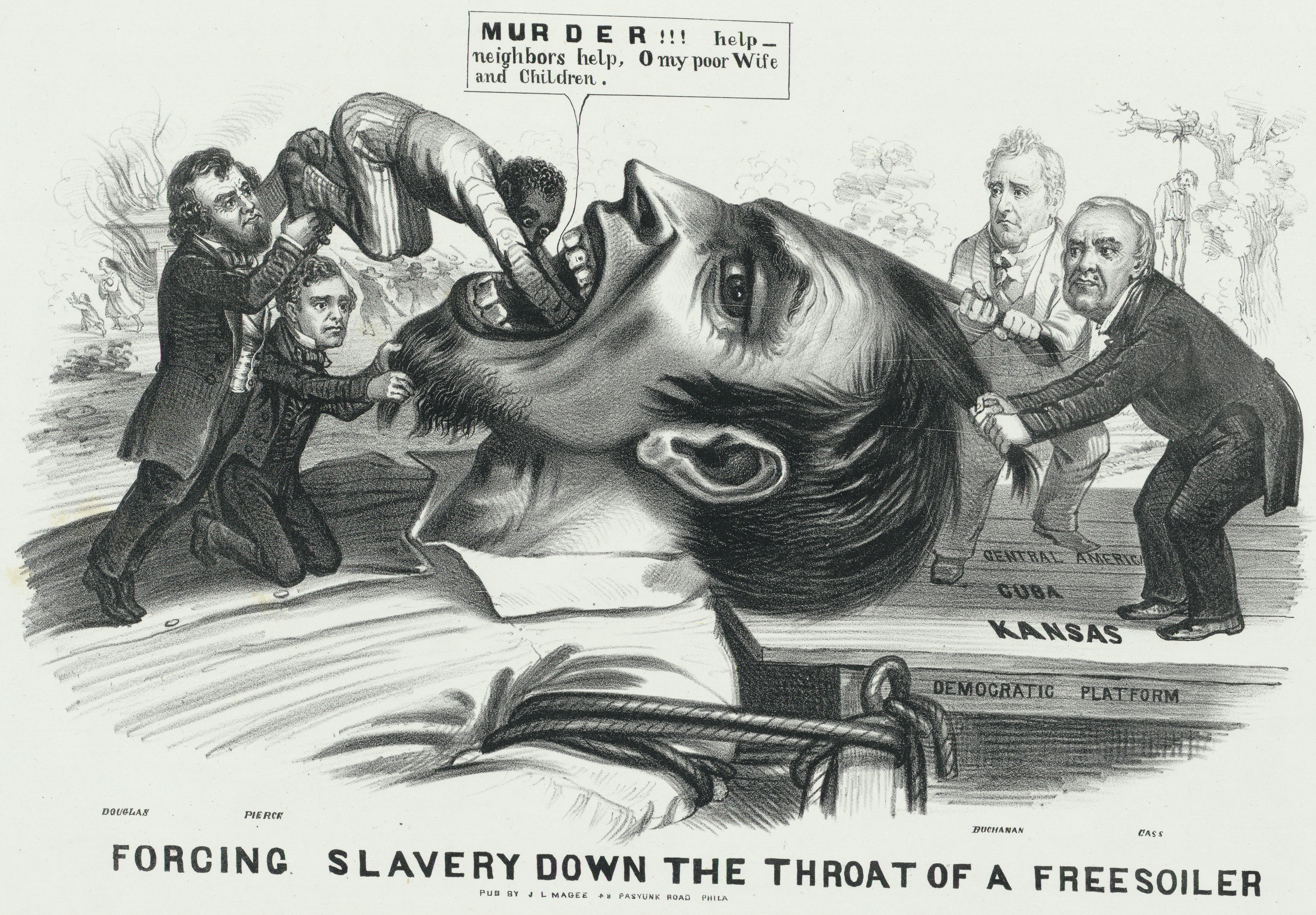
Forcing Slavery Down the Throat of a Freesoiler – An 1856 cartoon depicts a giant "Free Soiler" being held down by James Buchanan and Lewis Cass standing on the Democratic platform marked "Kansas", "Cuba" and "Central America". Franklin Pierce also holds down the giant's beard as Douglas shoves a black man down his throat. A victim of lynching can also be seen in the background.

Douglas expected to have influence in the selection of Pierce's cabinet, and possibly receive an appointment himself. However, Pierce largely ignored Douglas and gave key positions to Douglas's rivals, including Buchanan and Jefferson Davis. After the death of his daughter in early 1853, Douglas went on a five-month tour of Europe. Returning to the Senate in late 1853, he initially sought to avoid taking center stage in national debates, but once again became involved in disputes over slavery in the territories. To provide for western expansion and the completion of a transcontinental railroad, Douglas favored incorporating parts of the territory west of the Missouri River and east of the Rocky Mountains. In January 1854, he proposed to organize Nebraska Territory and Kansas Territory. Under the doctrine of popular sovereignty, the citizens of each territory would determine the status of slavery. Douglas also reluctantly agreed to an amendment that would provide for the formal repeal of the Missouri Compromise. Aided by Jefferson Davis, Douglas convinced Pierce to support his proposal.

Douglas's proposal, the Kansas–Nebraska Act, provoked a strong reaction in the North, where repeal of the Missouri Compromise was unpopular. Douglas argued that the Compromise of 1850 had already superseded the Missouri Compromise, and that citizens of the territories should have the right to determine the status of slavery. Opponents of popular sovereignty attacked its supposed fairness; Abraham Lincoln claimed that Douglas "has no very vivid impression that the Negro is human; and consequently has no idea that there can be any moral question in legislating about him". Nonetheless, the Kansas–Nebraska Act won passage in both houses of Congress. In both the House and the Senate, every Northern Whig voted against the Kansas–Nebraska Act, while just under half of the Northern Democrats and the vast majority of Southern congressmen of both parties voted in favor. Northern opponents of the act saw it as a triumph for the hated Slave Power. Douglas hoped that the Kansas–Nebraska Act would ease sectional tensions, and he was surprised by the intensity of Northern backlash. He later remembered, "I could travel from Boston to Chicago by the light of my own effigy."

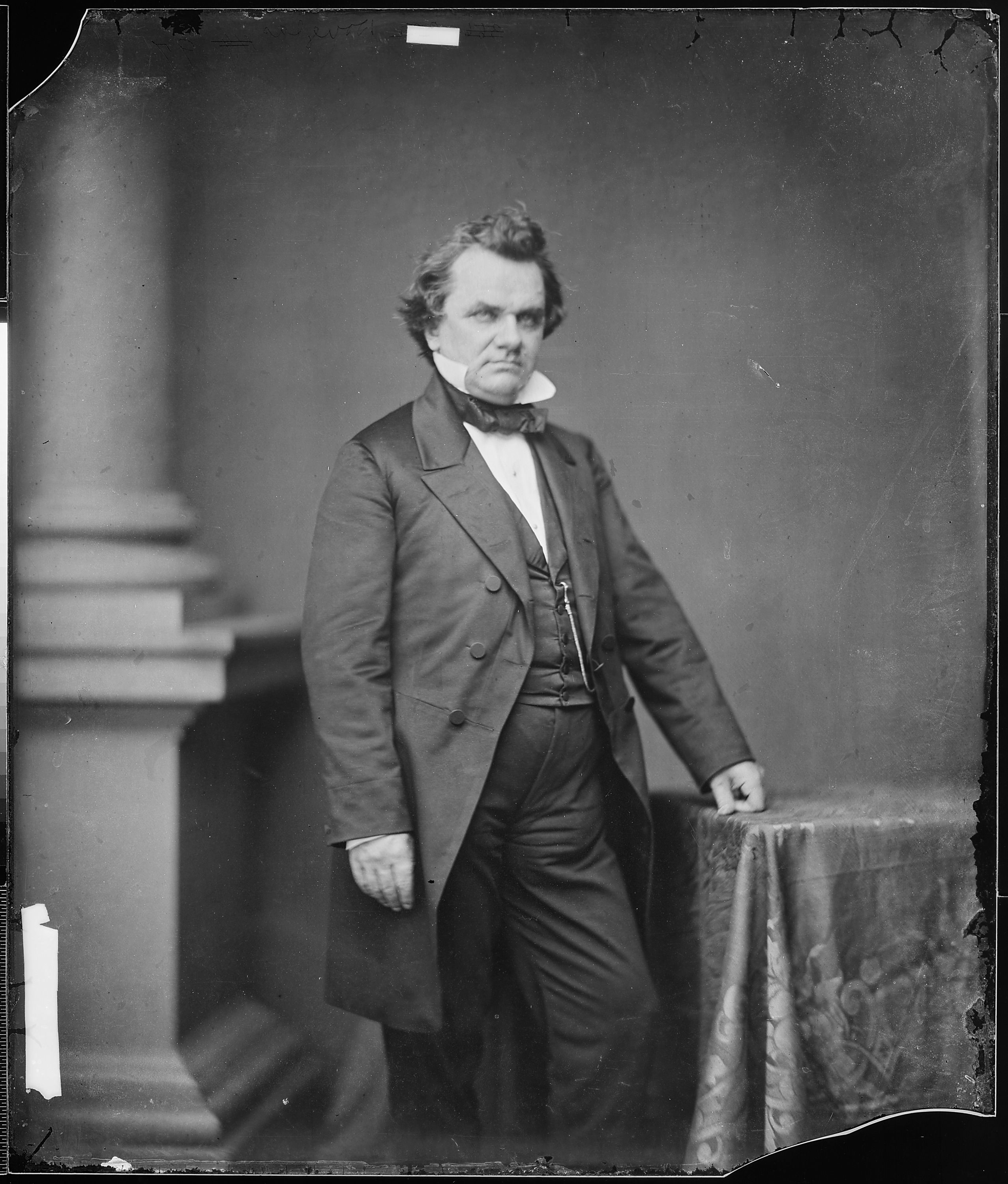
Stephen A. Douglas, photograph by Mathew Brady

Democrats suffered major losses in the 1854 elections, which saw the decline of the Whigs, the emergence of the nativist Know Nothing movement, and the founding of the anti-slavery Republican Party. The Illinois legislature replaced Senator James Shields, a Douglas ally, with Lyman Trumbull, an anti-slavery Democrat. After passage of the Kansas–Nebraska Act, anti-slavery and pro-slavery settlers flocked to Kansas Territory so they could influence the admission of Kansas to the Union. A series of violent clashes, Bleeding Kansas, broke out, and the two sides established competing governments. Douglas issued a committee report that endorsed the pro-slavery government as legitimate and denounced anti-slavery forces as the primary cause of the violence. Anti-slavery activists including Charles Sumner attacked Douglas for the report; one Northern paper wrote, "Douglas has brains, but so has the Devil, so had Judas and Benedict Arnold." As the Kansas crisis continued, the Whigs collapsed, and many former Whigs joined the Republicans, the Know Nothings, or, in the South, the Democrats. During the 1856 Chicago mayoral election, Douglas's faction strongly backed pro-Nebraska Democrat Thomas Dyer, who was elected.

Bleeding Kansas badly damaged Pierce's standing among Democratic leaders, and Pierce, Douglas, and Buchanan competed for the presidential nomination at the 1856 Democratic National Convention. Buchanan's greatest advantage was that he had been in Britain as ambassador for most of Pierce's presidency, and so avoided becoming involved in the Kansas–Nebraska Act debates. After Buchanan led on the first fourteen ballots, Pierce dropped out and endorsed Douglas. Douglas withdrew after being unable to take the lead, accepting assurances from Buchanan's campaign managers that Buchanan would clear the way for Douglas in 1860 by serving only one term if elected, and the convention nominated Buchanan on the seventeenth ballot. As in 1852, Douglas accepted defeat and campaigned for the Democratic nominee. In a three-person race, Buchanan defeated Republican John C. Frémont and Know Nothing Millard Fillmore. Buchanan dominated in the South, but Frémont won several Northern states; Douglas ally William Alexander Richardson lost the Illinois gubernatorial election.

=== Buchanan administration ===
Douglas hoped his pro-Buchanan efforts in the 1856 election would be rewarded with influence in the new administration. However, as had been the case with Pierce, Buchanan largely ignored Douglas. Shortly after Buchanan took office, the Supreme Court issued the Dred Scott decision, which declared that slavery could not be legally excluded from federal territories. Though the ruling was unpopular in the North, Douglas urged Americans to respect it, saying "whoever resists the final decision of the highest judicial tribunal aims a deadly blow at our whole republican system of government." He approved of another aspect of the ruling, which held that African-Americans could not be citizens, stating that the Founding Fathers "referred to the white race alone, and not the African, when they declared men to have been created free and equal".

In late 1857, the pro-slavery state legislature in Lecompton, Kansas organized a constitutional referendum on the future of slavery. Anti-slavery forces boycotted because both options required that slaves already in the state remain slaves regardless of the outcome. Territorial Governor Robert J. Walker denounced the referendum as a "vile fraud," and many Northern Democrats joined with Republicans in opposing it. Nonetheless, the state legislature presented the Lecompton Constitution to Buchanan, who called on Congress to ratify it. Buchanan stated, "Kansas is therefore at this moment as much a slave state as Georgia and South Carolina." After meeting with Walker, Douglas broke with Buchanan and declared the constitution was a "fraudulent submission" because it violated popular sovereignty, promising to "resist it to the last". Despite Douglas's efforts, Buchanan won congressional approval to admit Kansas as a slave state. Frustrating Buchanan's plans, the newly elected, anti-slavery Kansas legislature rejected admission as a slave state in April 1858. In the South, Douglas received much of the blame; one paper wrote that Douglas had severed "the ties which have hitherto bound this able statesman and the people of the South together in such a cordial alliance".

==== Lincoln–Douglas debates ====
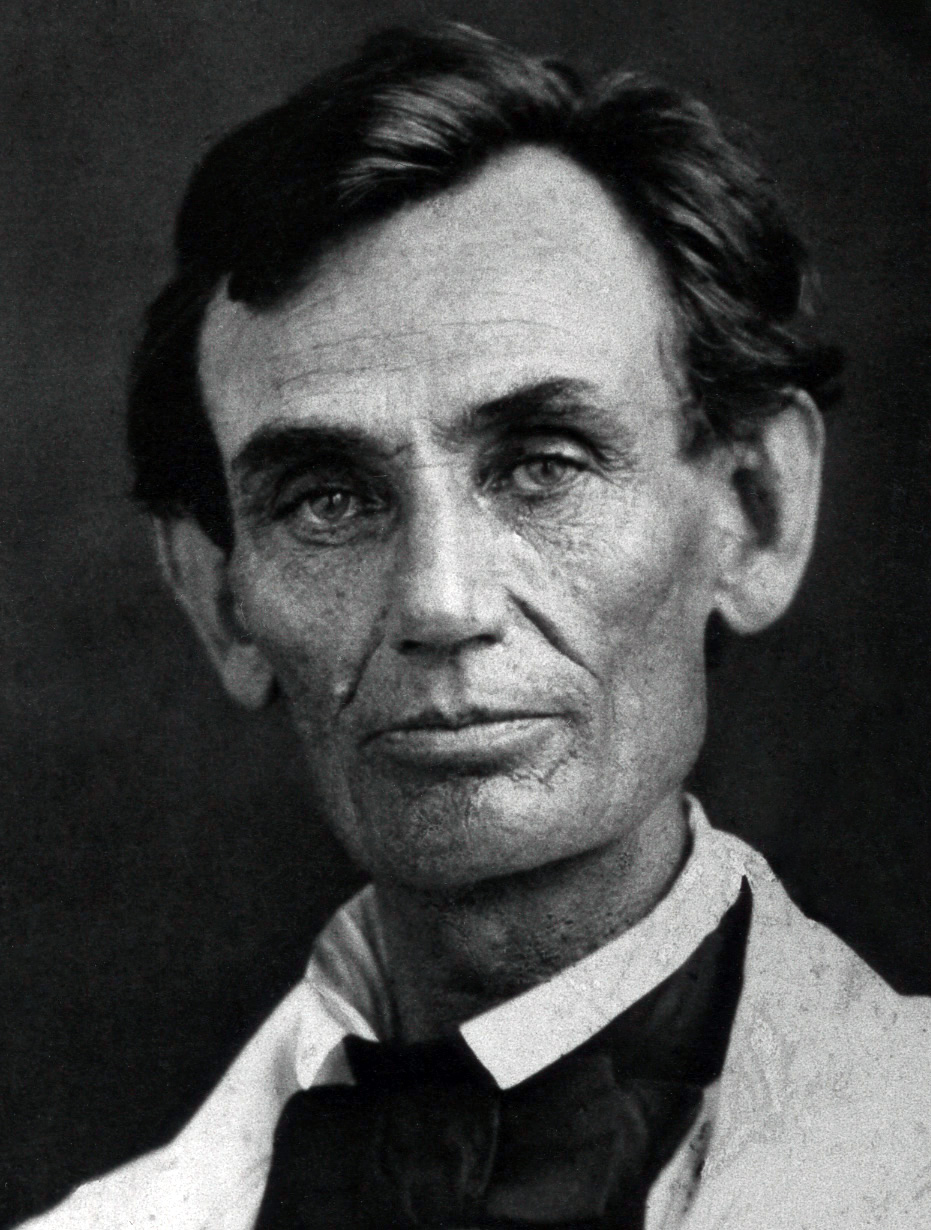
Abraham Lincoln was Douglas's opponent in both the 1858 Senate election in Illinois and the 1860 presidential election.

After his defeat by Trumbull in the 1854 Senate election, Lincoln began planning to run against Douglas in 1858. Lincoln strongly rejected proposals to cooperate with Douglas against Buchanan, and he was the choice of Republicans in the Illinois legislature to oppose Douglas. Accepting the nomination, Lincoln delivered his House Divided Speech, saying "A house divided against itself cannot stand. I believe this government cannot endure, permanently half slave and half free. I do not expect the Union to be dissolved—I do not expect the House to fall—but I do expect it will cease to be divided. It will become all one thing, or all the other." Douglas rejected Lincoln's notion that the United States could not continue to be divided into free and slave states, and warned that Lincoln called for "a war of secession, a war of the North against the South, of the free states against the slave states".

Douglas agreed to debate Lincoln in seven different towns. The format of the Lincoln-Douglas debates called for one candidate to make a one-hour opening speech, followed by the other delivering a ninety-minute rebuttal, followed by the first candidate delivering a half hour closing remark; Lincoln and Douglas agreed to rotate who would speak first. The debates focused on slavery in the territories, and, more broadly, the meaning of republicanism in the United States. Douglas favored popular sovereignty and emphasized the concept of self-government, though his vision of self-government encompassed only whites. Lincoln emphasized human equality and economic opportunity for all.

In the second debate, Douglas articulated the Freeport Doctrine, holding that the people in federal territories had "the lawful means to introduce [slavery] or exclude it as they please, for the reason that slavery cannot exist a day or an hour anywhere, unless it is supported by local police regulations. Those police regulations can only be established by the local legislature; and if the people are opposed to slavery, they will elect representatives to that body who will by unfriendly legislation effectually prevent the introduction of it into their midst." Douglas thus argued that territories could effectively exclude slavery despite the Dred Scott decision. At another appearance, Douglas reiterated his belief that the Declaration of Independence was not meant to apply to non-whites. He said, "this government was made by our fathers on the white basis ... made by white men for the benefit of white men and their posterity forever".

Lincoln criticized Douglas for his moral indifference to slavery, but denied any intention to interfere it in the South. He suggested that, despite the public break between Douglas and Buchanan over Kansas, the two Democrats had worked together to extend and perpetuate slavery. Lincoln disclaimed the views on racial equality attributed to him by Douglas, arguing only for the right of African Americans to personal liberty and to earn their own livings. He stated, "I am not, nor ever have been in favor of making voters of the negroes, or jurors, or qualifying them to hold office, or having them to marry with white people." At another debate, Lincoln stated, "I believe that slavery is wrong ... There is the difference between Judge Douglas and his friends and the Republican Party."

In an election that saw higher turnout than that of the 1856 presidential election, Democrats won 54 of the 100 state legislative seats. Despite the split with Buchanan and the strong challenge from Lincoln, legislators elected Douglas to a third term in January 1859. Following the elections, Douglas toured the South. He warned against sectionalism and secession, telling one crowd, "if you deem it treason for abolitionists to appeal to the passions and prejudices of the North, how much less treason is it, my friends, for southern men to appeal to the passions with the same end?"

=== 1859 change in Douglas's health and fortune ===
According to the Springfield Republican, in 1857 Douglas "was, next to General Cass, the richest man in public life"; by the end of 1859, after extravagant political spending and disappointing investments, he was near bankrupt. "Two months ago [before John Brown's raid on Harpers Ferry] he seemed to have more political power and popularity than any other American; everybody was talking about him, and his chances for the Presidency were hopefully discussed by his friends, and reluctantly conceded by his enemies—but now ... the Southern Democracy have ceased to fear him; and the Northern to worship him." He contracted a serious illness diagnosed as "gout in the stomach", described as "almost always fatal".

=== 1860 presidential election ===
==== Nomination ====
Douglas (dark blue) had the support of most Northern delegates on the presidential ballot of the 1860 Democratic National Convention.

Douglas's 1858 re-election solidified his standing as a leading contender for the Democratic nomination in the 1860 presidential election. His support was concentrated in the North, especially the Midwest, though some unionist Southerners, like Alexander H. Stephens, were sympathetic. Douglas remained on poor terms with Buchanan, and his Freeport Doctrine had further alienated many Southern senators. At the start of the 36th Congress, Buchanan and his Southern allies removed Douglas as chairman of the Senate Committee on Territories. Douglas helped defeat an attempt to pass a federal slave code, but saw his own bill to establish agricultural land-grant colleges vetoed by Buchanan.

The 1860 Democratic National Convention opened in Charleston, South Carolina, on April 23, 1860. Newspapers in the city attacked Douglas as the "Demagogue of Illinois," but Douglas was determined to uphold popular sovereignty, telling one supporter "I do not intend to make peace with my enemies, nor to make a concession of one iota of principle." Following precedent, Douglas did not attend, and the pro-Douglas forces were led by William Alexander Richardson. Other delegates were split into two broad factions: allies of Buchanan, led by a quartet of senators, and the Fire-Eaters, an extremist group of Southern delegates led by William Lowndes Yancey. After a battle over inclusion of popular sovereignty or a federal slave code in the party platform, several Southern delegations walked out. The convention subsequently held several rounds of presidential balloting, and while Douglas received by far the most support, he fell well short of the necessary two-thirds majority. After nearly sixty ballots, delegates agreed reconvene in Baltimore in June.

In the weeks leading up to the second Democratic convention, a group of former Whigs and Know Nothings formed the Constitutional Union Party and nominated John Bell for president. Bell campaigned on a simple platform that emphasized unionism, but received little support outside the South. In May, the 1860 Republican National Convention nominated Lincoln. The Democratic convention reconvened on June 18, and most Southern delegates once again bolted. The rump convention then nominated Douglas by an overwhelming margin. The party initially offered the vice presidential nomination to Benjamin Fitzpatrick, but after Fitzpatrick declined, Herschel Vespasian Johnson of Georgia accepted. Meanwhile, Southern Democrats held their own Baltimore convention and nominated Vice President John C. Breckinridge for president. Breckinridge did not openly support secession, but received the support of Fire-Eaters such as Jefferson Davis. Douglas rejected efforts to cooperate with Breckinridge, arguing that "any compromise with the secessionists would ... give every Northern state to Lincoln." The 1860 election essentially became two contests, with Breckinridge and Bell contesting the South and Lincoln and Douglas competing for the North.

==== General election ====
Douglas was defeated by Abraham Lincoln in the 1860 presidential election, although the second largest popular vote winner behind Lincoln, he won electoral votes from just two states.

Douglas broke with the precedent that presidential candidates did not openly campaign, and gave speeches across the Northeastern United States. Sensing an opportunity in the Upper South, he also campaigned in Virginia and North Carolina before campaigning in the crucial swing states of Pennsylvania, Ohio, and Indiana. While many Republicans did not take the talk of secession seriously, Douglas warned that some Southern leaders would seek immediate secession after the election. At Raleigh, North Carolina, he said "I am in favor of executing in good faith every clause and provision of the Constitution and protecting every right under it—and then hanging every man who takes up arms against it!" His campaign treasurer, August Belmont, struggled to raise funds for a candidacy that many regarded as a lost cause. Few newspapers endorsed Douglas, with the major exception being James Gordon Bennett Sr.'s New York Herald.

Anecdote

[James Buchanan] remarked to him [Douglas] that it was very perilous for a public man to put himself in opposition to his party—and that he must take the liberty of reminding him of the fate of Rives and Tallmadge, who rebelled against the policy of Gen. Jackson. "Permit me, Mr. President," Douglas replied, "permit me to remind you that General Jackson is dead."

— Henry Jarvis Raymond, The New York Times, March 26, 1858

The split in the Democrats enabled Lincoln to win Pennsylvania, Ohio, and Indiana. These states held elections for state offices in October, one month ahead of the nationwide presidential election, and Republican victories in those contests were taken as predictive. Facing certain defeat, at a rally in Milwaukee on October 13, Douglas lashed out at Buchanan, who had endorsed Breckinridge, by claiming Douglas had defied the president during a private meeting about Bleeding Kansas and the pro-slavery Lecompton Constitution. With no hope of victory, Douglas toured the South to speak against secession. In St. Louis, he told the audience, "I am not here tonight to ask for your votes for the presidency. I am here to make an appeal to you for the Union and the peace of the country." Despite denunciations from local newspapers, he continued his journey, speaking against secession in Tennessee, Georgia, and Alabama.

Missouri was the only state Douglas carried, though he also won three of New Jersey's seven electoral votes. Bell won Virginia, Kentucky, and Tennessee; Breckinridge swept the remaining Southern states, and Lincoln won California, Oregon, and every Northern elector outside of New Jersey. Though Douglas finished last in electoral votes, he won the second-highest popular vote total and was the lone candidate to win electoral votes from both a free state and a slave state. Following Lincoln's victory, many in the South planned for secession. One Douglas associate in the South wrote to him, "with your defeat, the cause of the Union was lost."

=== Last months ===
After the election, Douglas returned to the Senate, where he joined a committee of thirteen senators led by John J. Crittenden that sought to prevent secession. He supported the Crittenden Compromise, which called for amendments that would enshrine the Missouri Compromise line in the constitution, but it was defeated in committee by a combination of Republicans and Southern extremists. As late as Christmas 1860, Douglas wrote to Alexander H. Stephens and offered to support annexation of Mexico as slave territory to avert secession. South Carolina voted to secede on December 20, 1860, and five other Southern states had done so by mid-January. In February 1861, Jefferson Davis took office as president of the Confederate States of America.

Douglas unsuccessfully sought President-elect Lincoln's support for the Peace Conference of 1861, another attempt to head off secession. Lincoln was unwilling to support the conference, although Douglas described his meeting with Lincoln as "peculiarly pleasant". As a long-time opponent of protectionism, Douglas voted against the Morrill Tariff, which raised rates, instead calling for a customs union with Canada, Mexico, Cuba, and Central America. Douglas praised Lincoln's first inaugural address, describing it as "a peace offering rather than a war message" to the South.

After the Confederate attack on Fort Sumter in April 1861, Lincoln proclaimed a state of rebellion and called for 75,000 troops to suppress it. Douglas met with Lincoln and suggested that Lincoln should call for 200,000. "You do not know the dishonest purposes of those men as well as I do," he said. To a friend, he stated, "I've known Mr. Lincoln a longer time than you have, or than the country has. He'll come out all right, and we will all stand by him." In late April, Douglas departed Washington for the Midwest, where he rallied support for the Union.

== Position on slavery ==
Historians debate whether Douglas opposed slavery. Eric T. Dean, Jr. wrote that "Douglas's version of popular sovereignty [was not] a stalking horse for slavery. He firmly believed there were natural limits to the area into which slavery could expand, and these limits would be determined by laws of nature, climate, production, and self-interest rather than by an arbitrary geographical line established by Congress". In his "Freeport Doctrine", he said he did not care whether slavery was voted up or down, only that white voters had the right to decide. He denounced as sacrilegious petitions signed by thousands of clergymen in 1854, who said the Kansas–Nebraska Act offended God's will. He rejected Republican assertions that slavery was condemned by a "higher law" (Seward's position) and that the nation could not long survive as half slave and half free (Lincoln's position). He disagreed with the Supreme Court's Dred Scott decision that Congress had no ability to regulate slavery in the territories. In 1850, Douglas claimed that, contrary to his opponents' claims, he was not a doughface, a Northerner with Southern sympathies.

Graham Peck found that while several scholars have said Douglas was personally opposed to slavery, none has presented "extensive arguments to justify their conclusion". He cites scholarship finding Douglas "insensitive to the moral repugnance of slavery" or even "proslavery". He concludes that Douglas was the "ideological [and] practical head of the northern opposition to the antislavery movement" and questions whether Douglas "opposed black slavery for any reason, including economics". Harry V. Jaffa thought Douglas was tricking the South with popular sovereignty—telling Southerners it would protect slavery but believing voters would cast ballots against it. Johannsen found Douglas "did not regard slavery as a moral question; at least, he never condemned the institution in moral terms either publicly or privately." However, he "privately deplored slavery and was opposed to its expansion (and, indeed, in 1860 was widely regarded in both North and South as an antislavery candidate), he felt that its discussion as a moral question would place it on a dangerous level of abstraction."

== Marriage and family ==
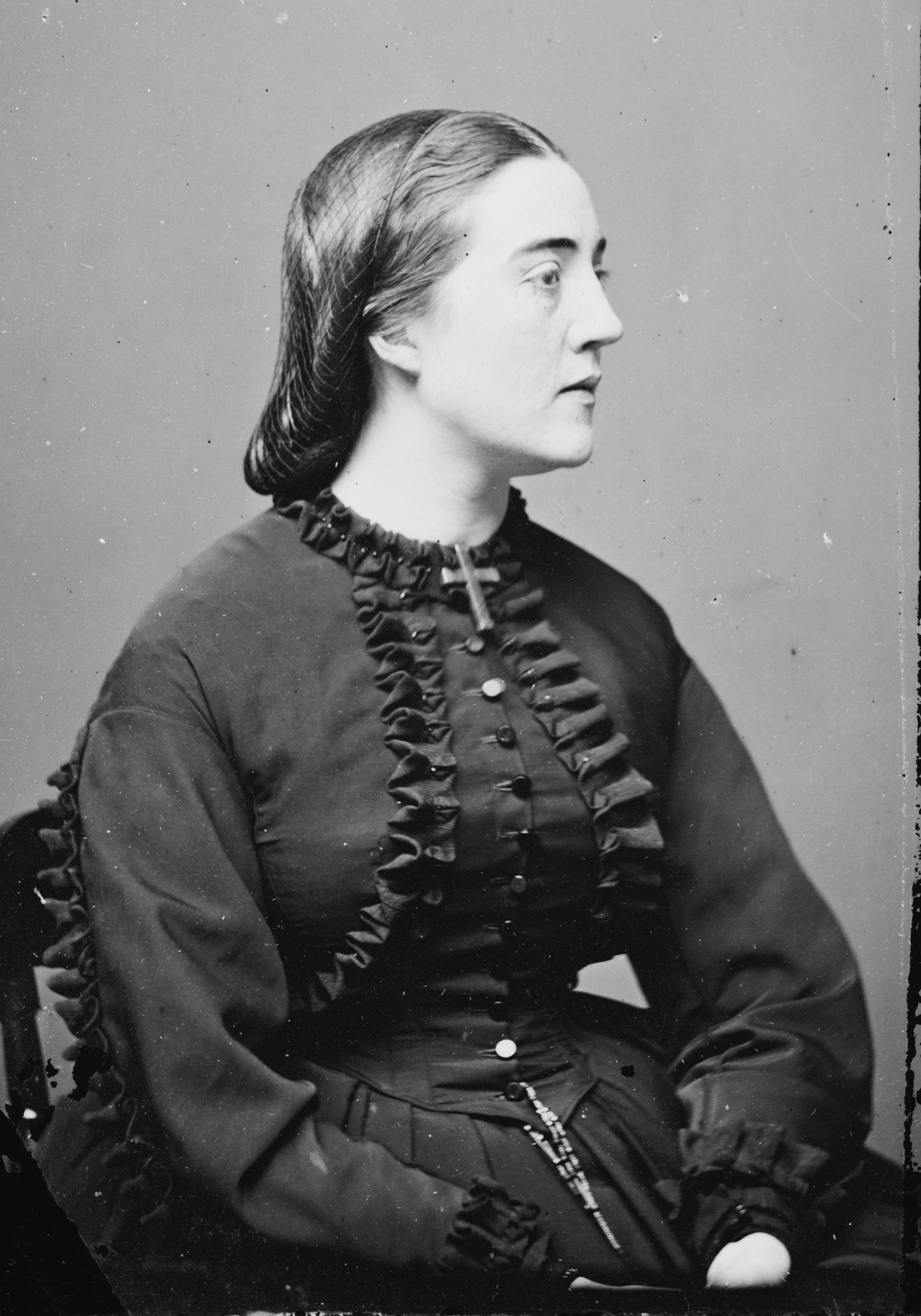
Adele Cutts, c. 1860

Douglas was among the many suitors of Mary Ann Todd, whom he met in 1837. They rekindled their courtship during a period when her relationship with Lincoln, another suitor, had cooled. Todd and Lincoln reconciled, and they married in 1842. In March 1847, Douglas married Martha Martin, the 21-year-old daughter of wealthy Colonel Robert Martin of North Carolina. The year after their marriage, Martha's father died and bequeathed her a 2,500-acre (1,000 ha) cotton plantation with 100 slaves on the Pearl River in Lawrence County, Mississippi. He appointed Douglas as property manager but as a presidential aspirant from a free state, Douglas recognized the political difficulties. He created distance by hiring a manager to operate the plantation while using his allocated 20 percent of its income to advance his political career. His sole lengthy visit to Mississippi was in 1848, after which he made only brief emergency trips. The Douglases moved home from Springfield to fast-growing Chicago in the summer of 1847. They had two sons: Robert M. Douglas (1849–1917) and Stephen Arnold Douglas Jr., (1850–1908). Martha Douglas died on January 19, 1853, after the birth of their third child, Ellen, who died a few weeks after her mother.

On November 20, 1856, Douglas married 20-year-old Adele Cutts, a Southern woman from Washington, D.C. whom he had met at a White House reception. She was the daughter of James Madison Cutts, a nephew of former President James Madison, and Ellen O'Neal, a niece of Rose O'Neal Greenhow. Her siblings included James M. Cutts. Adele's mother was from a Maryland Catholic family and raised Adele as a Catholic. With Stephen's approval, she had his sons baptized and reared in that faith. She had a miscarriage in 1858 and became ill. The following year, she gave birth to a daughter, Ellen. Adele was severely ill for several weeks after Ellen's birth but survived; Ellen died in June 1860 at six months of age. After Douglas's death, Adele married General Robert Williams, with whom she had six children.

=== Ancestry ===
Douglas's immediate ancestors were almost entirely from New England. His Douglass ancestors, upon emigrating from England in the early 1600s, settled in Connecticut where they lived for several generations until his grandfather, Benajah Douglass, moved to Stephentown, New York. From there, the family moved to Brandon, Vermont.

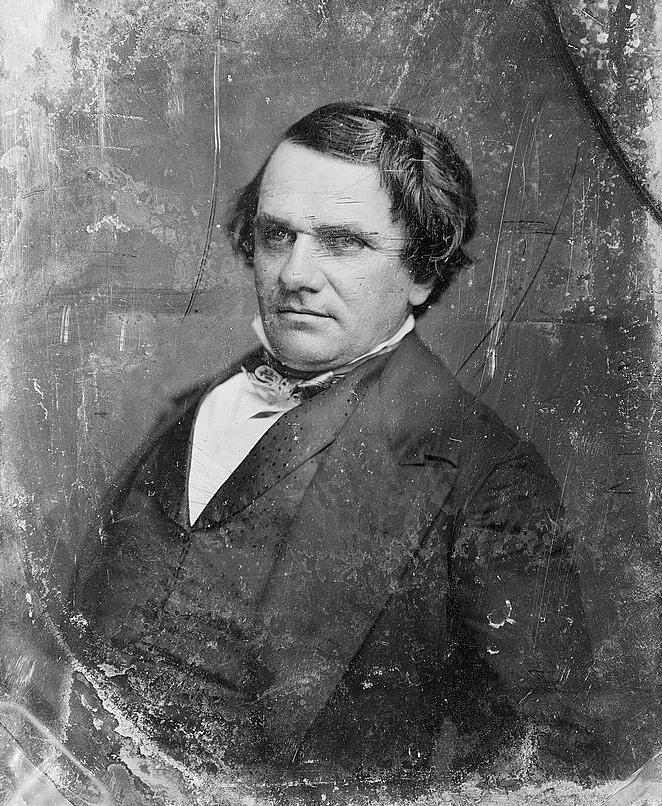
Stephen A. Douglas

Both of Douglas's grandmothers were Arnolds; each descended from early Providence proprietor William Arnold through a different son. His paternal grandmother, Martha (Arnold) Douglass, was the daughter of Stephen Arnold, who left Rhode Island to settle in Stephentown. Stephen was the son of Joseph Arnold of North Kingstown and Exeter, Rhode Island. Through Joseph Arnold, Douglas descended from Benedict Arnold, the first governor of the Rhode Island colony under the Royal Charter of 1663, and the older son of William Arnold. In this line, he also descended from Samuel Wilbore and John Porter, two signers of the compact that established the first government in the Rhode Island colony. He also descended from Wilbore's son, Samuel Wilbur Jr., an original purchaser of the Pettaquamscutt lands that became South Kingstown. Through his paternal grandmother, Douglas descended from Indian captive Susanna Cole and her famous mother, Anne Hutchinson, as well as early Newport settler George Gardiner and his common-law wife Herodias Gardiner. Douglas's maternal grandmother, Sarah (Arnold) Fisk, was a descendant of William Arnold through his younger son, Stephen Arnold. She also descended from early Rhode Island Baptist minister Pardon Tillinghast.

In the following ancestral chart, persons 1–7, 10–11, 14–15, 20–23, and 28–31 are all documented in the book The Arnold Memorial, published in 1935 by Elisha Stephen Arnold, a fairly close relative of Douglas's. Persons 8–9 and 16–17 are documented in a New England Historical and Genealogical Register article that was captured in a collection of Connecticut genealogies. The remaining persons, and a few additional dates, all come from online sources that are found under "External links."

Ancestors of Stephen A. Douglas

16. William Douglas (1672–1719)
8. Asa Douglas (1715–1792)
17. Sarah Proctor (died after 1729)
4. Benajah Douglas (1760–1818)
18. Jonathan Wheeler (1696–1779)
9. Rebecca Wheeler (1718–1809)
19. Sarah (born c. 1698)
2. Stephen Arnold Douglas (1781–1813)
20. Joseph Arnold (1710–1776)
10. Stephen Arnold (1739–1810)
21. Hannah Gifford (c. 1718 – 1798)
5. Martha Arnold (1762–1818)
22. Nicholas Gardiner (1710–1800)
11. Martha Gardiner (1739–1819)
23. Martha Havens (died 1746)
1. Stephen Arnold Douglas (1813–1861)
24. Benjamin Fisk (1683–1765)
12. Benjamin Fisk (1705/6 – 1771)
25. Abigail Bowen (born 1688)
6. Nathaniel Fisk (1735–1807)
26. James Briggs (1671–1757)
13. Susan Briggs (born 1710)
27. Sarah Wickes (died 1755)
3. Sarah Fisk (1789–1869)
28. Stephen Arnold (1654–1720)
14. Edward Arnold (1707–1775)
29. Mary Sheldon (died 1735)
7. Sarah Arnold (1753–1803)
30. Nicholas Sheldon (c. 1661 – 1747)
15. Hannah Sheldon (c. 1710 – 1780)
31. Abigail Tillinghast (1673–1744)

== Death and funeral ==
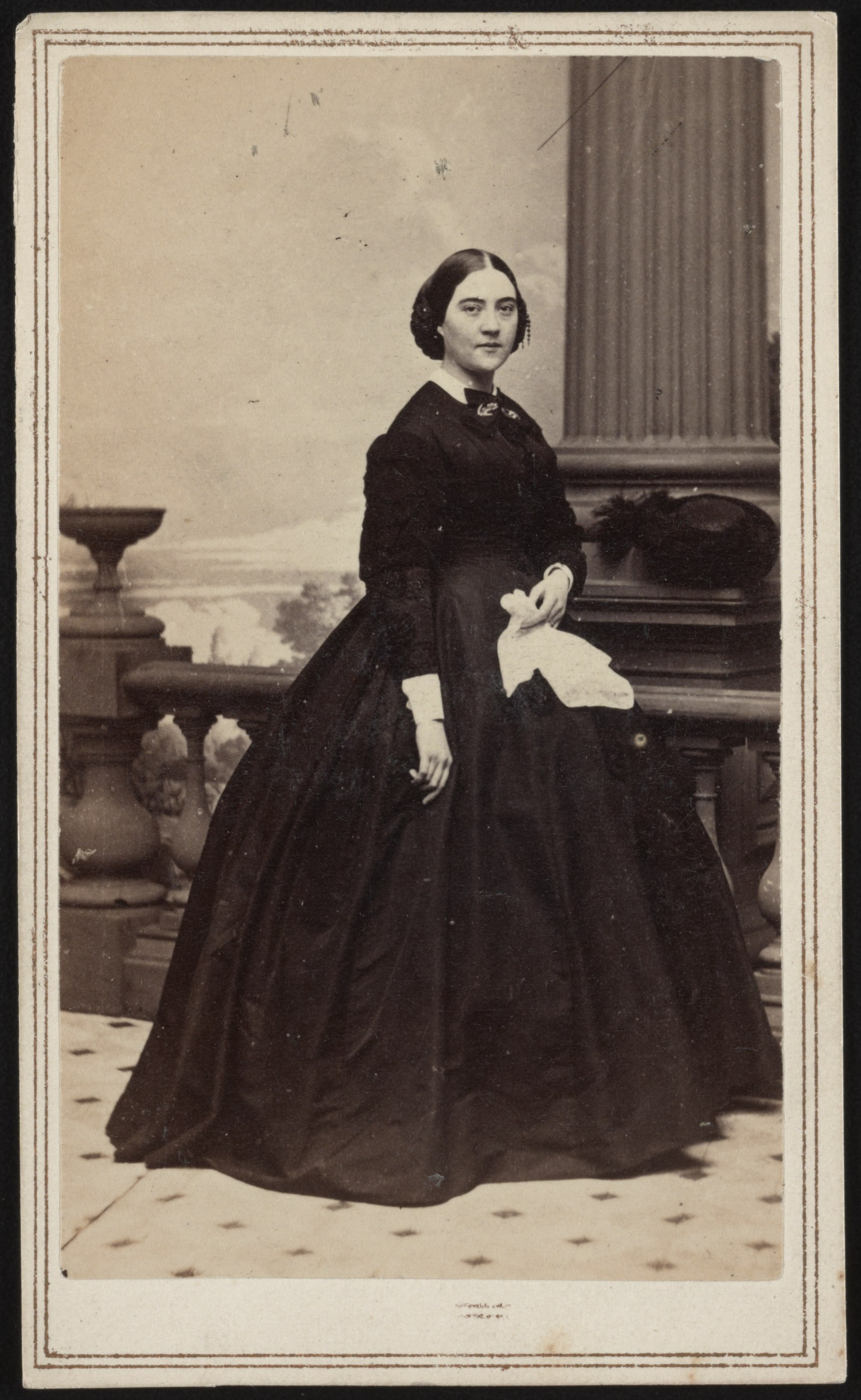
Douglas's widow, Adele, in mourning dress. From the Liljenquist Family Collection of Civil War Photographs, Prints and Photographs Division, Library of Congress

Douglas fell ill after a speech in Springfield on April 25, 1861. He was confined to bed and developed throat ulcers, rheumatism and a fever in early May, while staying at the Tremont House in Chicago. It became clear that Douglas had contracted typhoid fever; he fell into unconsciousness and rarely awoke, and died at around 9 a.m. on June 3. His last words, spoken to Adele were reportedly "Tell my children to obey the laws and support the Constitution of the United States." Though these words were interpreted by Republicans as supportive of Lincoln's raising of the Union Army, many Southerners, including Alexander H. Stephens, thought they were a condemnation of Lincoln's actions. On June 4, Secretary of War Simon Cameron issued a circular to Union armies, announcing "the death of a great statesman ... a man who nobly discarded party for his country". Composer George W. Hewitt created "Douglas' Funeral March", which included a likeness of Douglas on the cover. The funeral took place on June 7 at Douglas's estate in Chicago; it was led by Bishop James Duggan and attended by more than 5,000 people, including 64 pallbearers. Douglas was buried in a white marble tomb near the University of Chicago.

== Legacy ==
=== Historical reputation ===
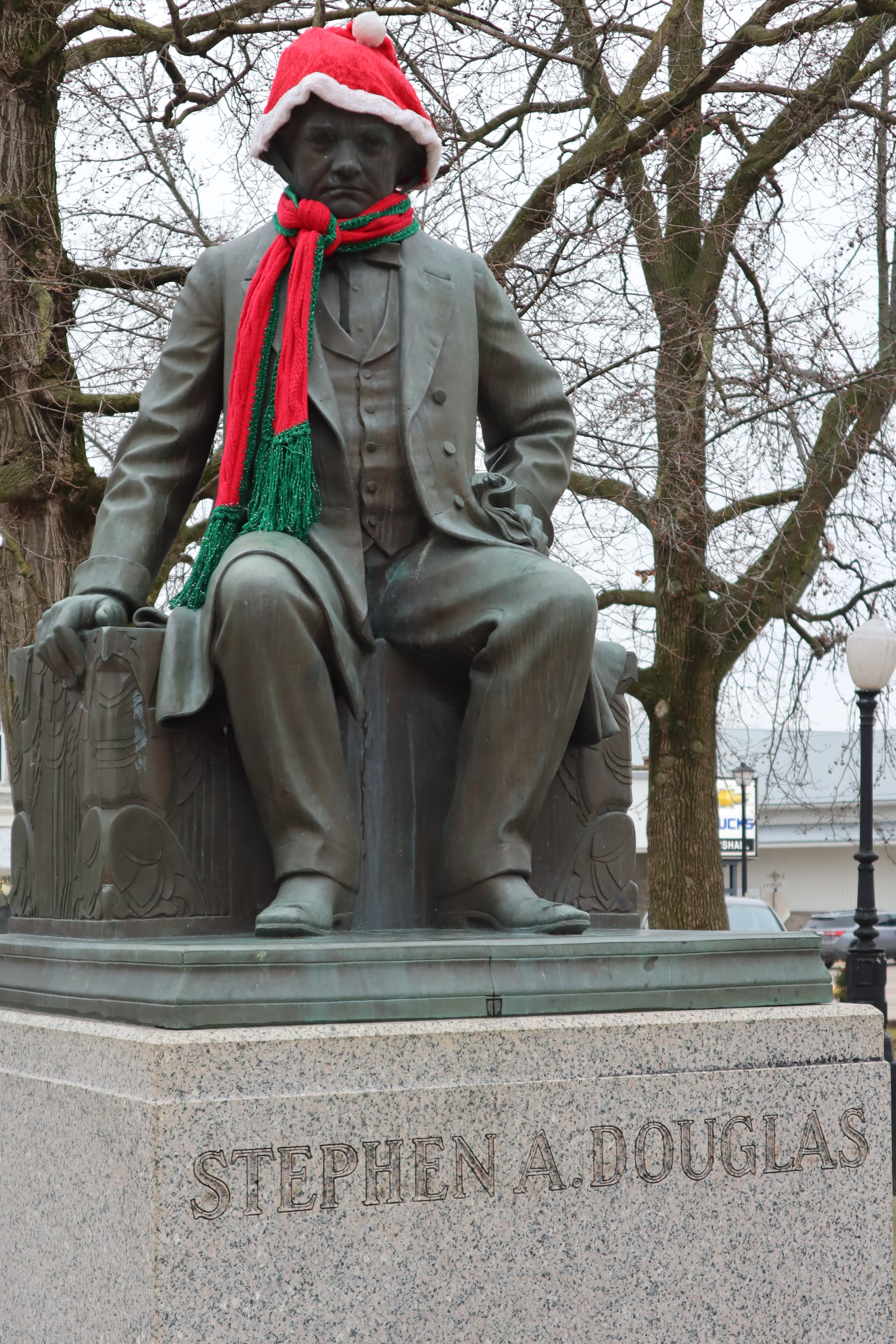
Douglas statue in Winchester, Illinois

According to biographer Roy Morris Jr., Douglas "is remembered, if at all, for a hard-fought election victory that most people believe mistakenly was a defeat". Morris adds that "for the better part of two decades, Douglas was the most famous and controversial politician in the United States." Douglas always had a deep and abiding faith in democracy. "Let the people rule!" was his cry, and he insisted that the people locally could and should make the decisions about slavery, rather than the national government. According to biographer Robert W. Johanssen:

Douglas was preeminently a Jacksonian, and his adherence to the tenets of what became known as Jacksonian democracy grew as his own career developed. ... Popular rule, or what he would later call popular sovereignty, lay at the base of his political structure. Like most Jacksonians, Douglas believed that the people spoke through the majority, that the majority will was the expression of the popular will.

Damon Wells wrote in Stephen Douglas: The Last Years, 1857–1861 that most historians viewed Douglas in retrospect as a "tragic character" and wrote of him as if his political career was "in the shadow" of Lincoln's.

=== Old University of Chicago ===
In 1856, Douglas donated land on which Chicago Baptist leaders built the Old University of Chicago.

=== Memorials ===
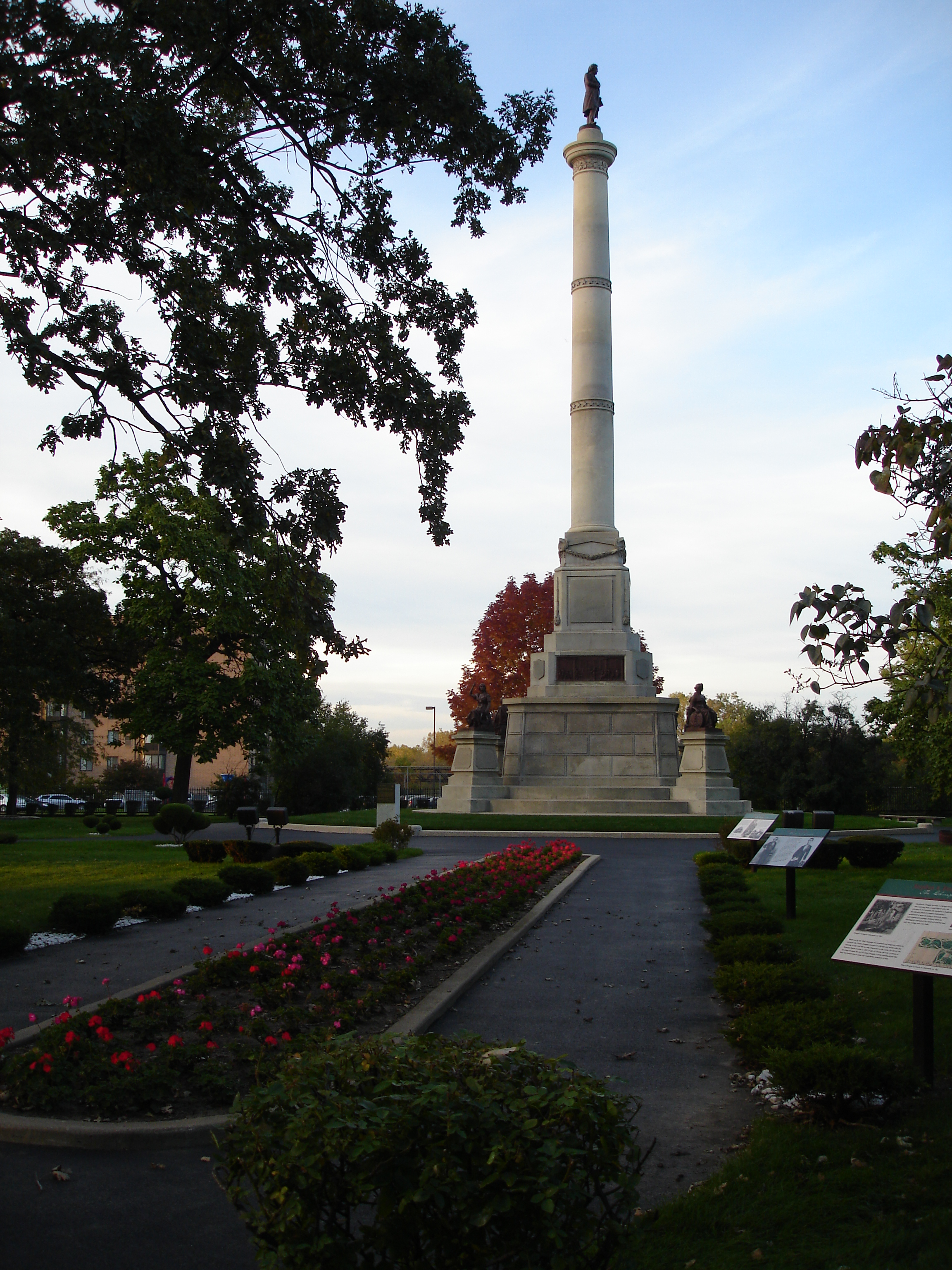
Douglas's tomb

The state of Illinois commissioned Leonard Volk to create a monument with a statue that was erected over Douglas's grave. Douglas's birthplace in Brandon, Vermont, is a museum and visitor center. Numerous places have been named after him: counties in Colorado, Georgia, Illinois, Kansas, Minnesota, Missouri, Nebraska, Nevada, Oregon, South Dakota, Washington and Wisconsin. Fort Douglas in Salt Lake City, the cities of Douglas and Douglasville in Georgia, and Douglas, Wyoming, were also named for him.

In 1869, Chicago's Douglas Park was named in honor of Douglas. After reconsideration of his legacy with respect to slavery, in 2020, park district leaders renamed the site Douglass Park, in honor of Frederick Douglass and Anna Murray Douglass. Two adjacent dormitories on the Eastern Illinois University campus were named Douglas Hall and Lincoln Hall in 1951. In April 2022, Douglas Hall was renamed because of Douglas's racist views and is now Powell-Norton Hall.

=== In popular culture ===
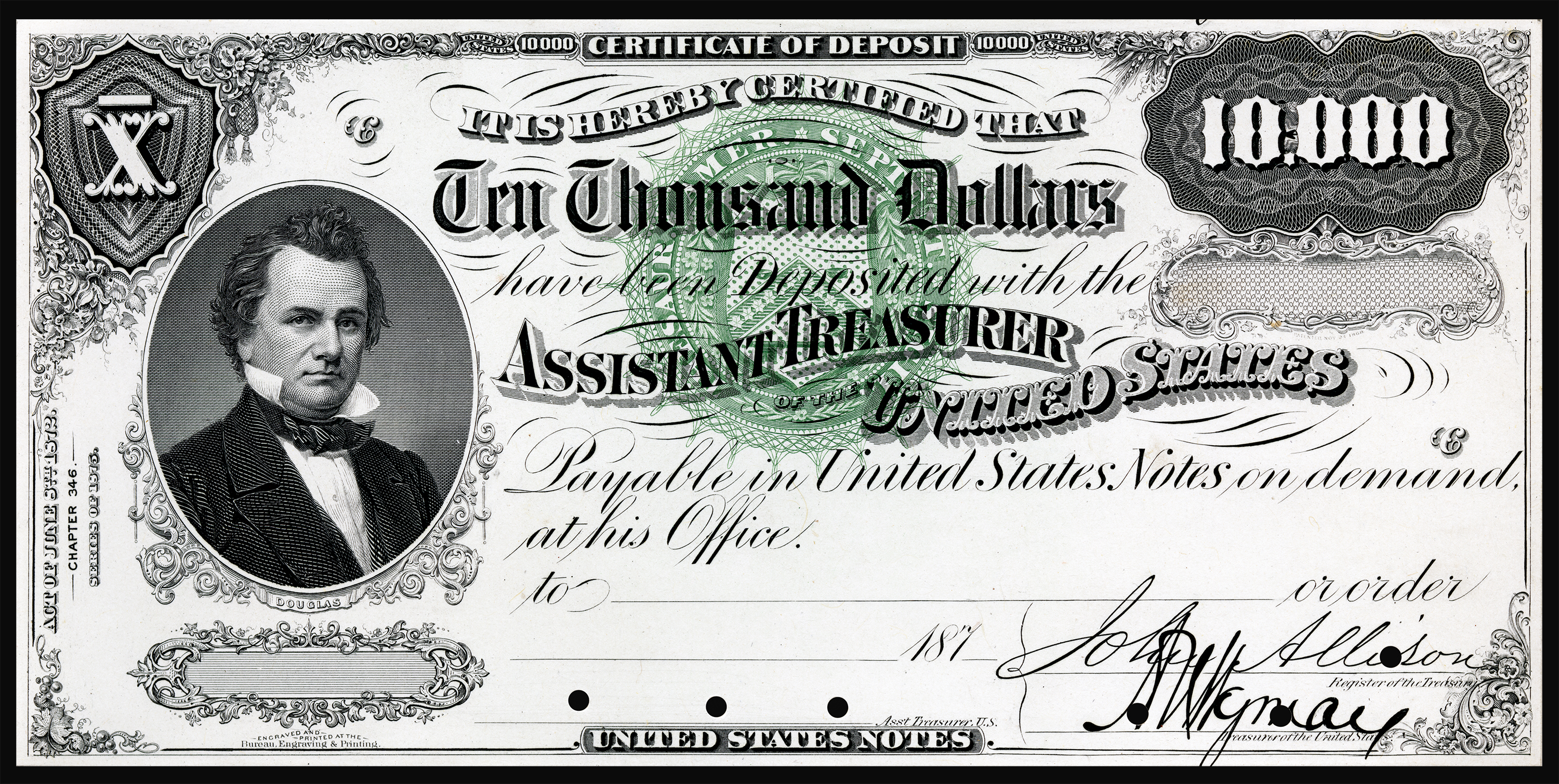
Douglas depicted on the Series 1875 $10,000 Certificate of Deposit

A funereal poem, "Bury Me in the Morning", is attributed by some sources to Douglas.

In 1930, E. Alyn Warren portrayed Douglas in the United Artists film Abraham Lincoln. In 1939, Milburn Stone played Douglas in the Twentieth Century-Fox film Young Mr. Lincoln. In 1940, Gene Lockhart portrayed Douglas in the RKO film Abe Lincoln in Illinois. In 1957, Walter Coy depicted Douglas in the episode "Springfield Incident" of CBS's The 20th Century Fox Hour. Richard Dreyfuss portrayed Douglas in a Lincoln–Douglas debate audiobook.

Douglas is referenced by folk artist Sufjan Stevens in the song "Decatur, or, Round of Applause for Your Stepmother!". Edgar Lee Masters's work Children of the Market Place is about Stephen Douglas. In the alternate history short story "Lincoln's Charge" by Bill Fawcett (published in Alternate Presidents), Douglas wins the election of 1860, a change which postpones the outbreak of the Civil War by a year. Douglas is a significant character in the mash-up novel Abraham Lincoln, Vampire Hunter, and also appears in the film adaptation.

== See also ==
- List of Freemasons
- List of members of the United States Congress who died in office (1790–1899)
- Origins of the American Civil War
- Richard Eells, abolitionist against whom Judge Douglas ruled

Political offices
Preceded by Alexander P. Field	Secretary of State of Illinois; 1840–1841	Succeeded by Lyman Trumbull
U.S. House of Representatives
New constituency	Member of the U.S. House of Representatives from Illinois's 5th congressional district 1843–1847	Succeeded by William Richardson
U.S. Senate
Preceded by James Semple	U.S. Senator (Class 2) from Illinois; 1847–1861; Served alongside: Sidney Breese, James Shields, Lyman Trumbull	Succeeded by Orville H. Browning
Party political offices
Preceded by James Buchanan	Democratic nominee for President of the United States¹; 1860	Succeeded by George McClellan
Notes and references
1. The Democratic Party split in 1860, producing two presidential nominees. Douglas was nominated by Northern Democrats; John C. Breckinridge was nominated by Southern Democrats.
