= Robert Williams (adjutant general) =

United States Army general

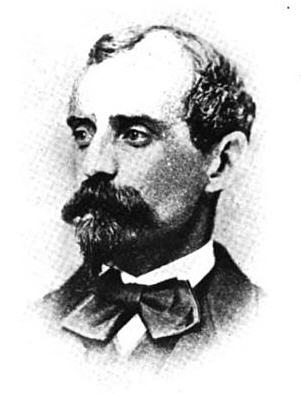
- Robert Williams
- Born: November 5, 1829; Culpeper County, Virginia
- Died: August 24, 1901 (aged 71); Netherwood, New Jersey
- Burial place: Arlington National Cemetery
- Military career
- Allegiance: United States of America; Union
- Branch: United States Army; Union Army
- Service years: 1851–1893
- Rank: Brigadier General
- Commands: Adjutant General of the U.S. Army
- Conflicts: American Civil War; American Indian Wars

Robert Williams (November 5, 1829–August 24, 1901) was an American military officer who was Adjutant General of the United States Army from 1892 to 1893.

== Biography ==
He was born in Culpeper County, Virginia and graduated from the United States Military Academy in 1851. He was appointed to the 1st Dragoons, in which he served until the outbreak of the American Civil War. He served in various staff positions at the beginning of the war, before becoming colonel of 1st Massachusetts Volunteer Cavalry in October 1861. He resigned his Volunteer commission in October 1862 and became a major in the Adjutant General's Department.

Williams remained in the Adjutant General's Department following the end of the war, and was promoted to lieutenant colonel in February 1869. He served as adjutant general of the Department of the Missouri, the Department of the Platte, and the Division of the Missouri, earning a promotion to colonel in July 1881. In December 1890 he returned to the Adjutant General's Department in Washington, and he was elevated to Adjutant General of the U. S. Army with the rank of brigadier general in July 1892. He retired in November 1893.

He died August 24, 1901, and is buried in Arlington National Cemetery.

== Obituary ==
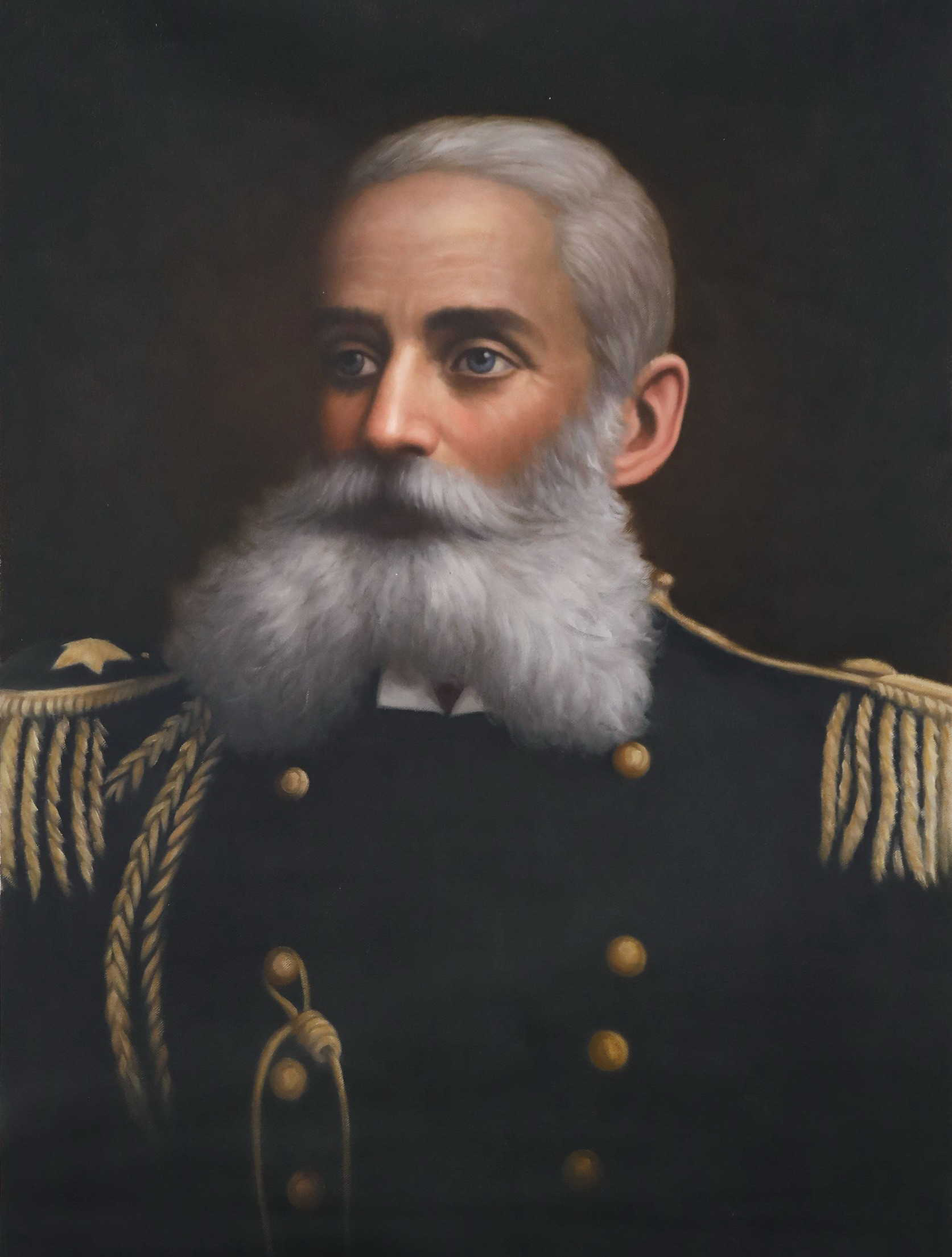
Brigadier General Robert Williams

The preceding image, and the text that follows, are reproduced from (the report of the) Thirty-Third Annual Reunion of the Association of the Graduates of the United States Military Academy, June 9th, 1902. p76

NO. 1512. CLASS OF 1851.

Brigadier General Robert Williams, formerly Adjutant General of the Army, died at Netherwood, New Jersey, on the 24th of August, 1901, in the 72nd year of his age. At West Point he was the First Captain of the Corps in 1850-51. Upon graduation, he joined the First Dragoons. His early service was in Oregon, New Mexico and California. A distinguished officer, who served as an enlisted man with him for a portion of this time, has recently said that his troopers learned to love him, for he never subjected them to privation that he did not fully share himself. And it may be added that he was one who never required his men to go where he was not willing to lead. In the closing days of 1857, he returned to the Academy as Instructor of Cavalry. About this time he became involved with an intimate friend, a classmate, in a matter in which their interests and affections clashed. He felt that it was due that his position should be fully explained, and he sent a letter to his friend which failed of kindly appreciation.

The estrangement became acute. The days of dueling had not then passed, and it seemed to him that open vindication must be obtained upon the field. An incident of service brought the other party to Washington. Williams at once secured leave of absence from the Academy, went to Washington and sought and found him and offered such decided affront that a challenge followed immediately and was accepted. The duel took place at Bladensburg. It was the last, or very nearly the last, encounter upon that noted field. A. P. Hill, later Lieutenant General in the Confederate Army, killed in the capture of Petersburgh, Va., early in April, 1865, was one of Williams' seconds; the name of the other is not recalled. Williams was a good shot, but his opponent was known to be a dead shot. The choice of positions fell so that the latter faced the rising sun; dazzled by its rays, he fired just in advance of the word, and his bullet went crashing through Williams' hat, grazed his scalp and carried away a lock of his hair. Unnerved, steadily, Williams took deadly aim at his antagonist, then raised the muzzle of his pistol and fired into the air. He had vindicated his honor; he had given satisfaction for his affront; but he would not kill or maim the man who had been his friend. It was the chivalry of his nature. Thus amicably terminated the feud. Natural death came to his opponent not very many months thereafter, just previous to the outbreak of the Civil War. The affair was one of which Williams was not wont to speak, even to his intimate friends.

Early in 1861 he was appointed Assistant Adjutant General and served in the Department of Annapolis and the Department of the Shenandoah. In the autumn he was offered and accepted the Colonelcy of the First Massachusetts Cavalry. In less than three months, aided by the very intelligent material commissioned officers, he moulded raw men into disciplined troops. The General, a regular officer, to whom he reported with his command in South Carolina, in January, 1862, remarked, within the past few days of this writing, that the drill and discipline, appearance and spirit of the regiment were perfect, and that better was never seen in the permanent establishment. He was engaged with his regiment in operations about Hilton Head, S. C., until August, 1862, and led it in the attack upon Secessionville, James Island, S. C., in June.

In August, 1862, his regiment was transferred to the Army of the Potomac, and he served in command of it in operations in Central Virginia and in the battles of South Mountain and Antietam. Aggrieved at injustice which he claimed to have received at this time from his immediate Commanding General, and failing to obtain redress therefor, his high spirit would not brook further irritating service under him, and he thereupon threw up his Colonel's commission and returned to duty in the Adjutant General's department. The regiment never lost the impress of its first Colonel and gave to history a gallant record throughout the war.

Duty in the War Department during the war, and, later, service as Adjutant General of the Department of the Missouri, and, in succession, as Adjutant General of the Department of the Platte and of the Division of the Missouri, in Indian Wars in the west, thereafter claimed his energies, until he was brought back to the War Department in December, 1890. On July 5, 1892, he was appointed Adjutant General, and from that time discharged the duties at that office till November 5, 1893, when he was retired by operation of law, under the age limit.

== Marriage and family ==
He married on January 23, 1866 to Rose Adele Cutts, the widow of Stephen A. Douglas, and niece of Dolly Madison, considered one of the great beauties of the capital. It was a happy marriage; they had six children, two of whom were Army officers. Adele preceded him in death, dying January 26, 1899. They are buried side by side in Arlington National Cemetery.

Military offices
Preceded by John C. Kelton	Adjutant General of the U. S. Army; July 5, 1892-November 5, 1893	Succeeded by George D. Ruggles
