= Herodias Gardiner =

Quaker settler of Rhode Island colony (c. 1623–after 1674)

- Born: c. 1623; England
- Died: after 1674
- Other names: Herodias Long; Herodias Hicks; Herodias Porter; Horrod/Harrud...etc.
- Occupations: Mother, missionary
- Spouse(s): (1) John Hicks (2) George Gardiner (3) John Porter
- Children: Hannah Hicks; Thomas Hicks; Benoni Gardiner; Henry Gardiner; George Gardiner; William Gardiner; Nicholas Gardiner; Dorcas Gardiner; Rebecca Gardiner

Herodias Gardiner (c. 1623 – after 1674), born Herodias Long, was the wife of three early settlers of the Colony of Rhode Island and Providence Plantations, and was also a zealous Quaker evangelist who was whipped in Massachusetts for sharing her religious testimony with others in her former home town of Weymouth. She married at the age of 13 or 14 in London, she was unhappily brought to the American colonies by her first husband, John Hicks, where they settled in Weymouth. The couple had two known children, and moved to the Rhode Island Colony, but she soon separated from her husband, and looking for maintenance, settled in Newport with George Gardiner, with whom she lived for about 20 years as his common-law wife.

In 1658 she and a friend made a difficult journey to Massachusetts to present their Quaker message, and they were brought before the Governor, then whipped and imprisoned. A few years later, in 1665, Herodias left Gardiner, and went to live with prominent and wealthy John Porter in the Narragansett country west of the Narragansett Bay. She left behind many court records documenting her marital turmoils. She had nine known children with her first two husbands, and has many descendants.

== Life ==
=== First marriage: John Hicks ===
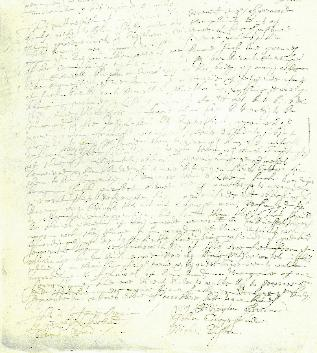
William Coddington's 1644 account of the separation of Herodias from John Hicks

Herodias Long was born in England about 1623, but her place of nativity is not known. She may be the Odias Longe who was left a legacy of five pounds in early 1639 by John Ayshford, who owned land in 'Little Ockenbury' and in Barbados. According to her testimony in court many years later, she was sent to London following the death of her father, and here, unknown to her friends, she married John Hicks. She was 13 or 14 years old when they were married at Saint Faith's Church ("under Saint Paul's"), and their marriage licence was dated 14 March 1636/7. Shortly after their marriage, to her "great grief," they immigrated to New England, and settled in Weymouth in the Massachusetts Bay Colony. Here they lived until about 1640, when they moved to Aquidneck Island, probably settling in the town of Newport. They had two children together, but soon after moving to Rhode Island differences arose between them, and Herodias separated from Hicks, and consummated a relationship with George Gardiner, with whom she lived for the next 20 years as his common law wife. Hicks went off to live with the Dutch, and was in the process of obtaining a divorce from her in Rhode Island in December 1643, when he sent a letter from Flushing, New Netherland to Rhode Island magistrate John Coggeshall. Hicks also eventually obtained a divorce from her in New Netherland, charging her with adultery.

It appears that Herodias had been in an abusive relationship, based on a 7 March 1644 court case where John Hicks of Newport was "bound to the Peace by the Governor [sic], Mr. Easton, in a bond, for beating his wife Harwood Hicks..." (Easton was actually an Assistant, not the Governor.) In her later testimony, Herodias states "...that the authority that was then under grace, saw cause to part us, and ordered that I should have the estate which was sent me by my mother, delivered to me by the said John Hickes; but I never had it, but the said John Hickes went away to the Dutch, and carried away with him the most of my estate; by which means I was put to great hardship and straight." In his letter to Coggeshall, dated 12 December 1644, John Hicks wrote, "...the Knott of affection on her part have been untied long since, and her whoredome have freed my conscience on the other part, so I leave myself to yor advice if there may be such a way used for the finall parting for us."

=== Second marriage: George Gardiner ===
Soon after her break with Hicks, Herodias lived with George Gardiner and spent the next 20 years with him raising a family of seven children, the oldest five of whom were boys, and the two youngest girls. During this time, Herodias became an avid Quaker convert, and she once again stepped into public view in May 1658. She, "with her babe at her breast" (her daughter Rebecca), and her friend Mary Stanton made a difficult journey through 60 miles of wilderness from Newport to her former hometown of Weymouth to deliver her religious testimony. For this, she was taken before Governor John Endecott in Boston, and she and her companion were sentenced to be whipped with ten lashes. Following the whipping, with a three fold knotted whip of cords, Herodias was jailed for 14 days.

Herodias once again appeared in the public record in 1665 when she appeared in court, asking for a separation from Gardiner, relating that she had earlier "joined up with George Gardiner for her maintenance but was never properly married to him." However, testimony of George Gardiner's friend, Robert Stanton, declared that one night at his house both George and Herodias did say before him and his wife that they took one another as man and wife. Herodias now desired of the Assembly that the estate and labor that Gardiner "had of mine, he may allow it me, and house upon my land I may enjoy without molestation, and that he may allow me my child to bring up, with maintenance for her, and that he be restrained from troubling me more."

=== Third marriage: John Porter ===
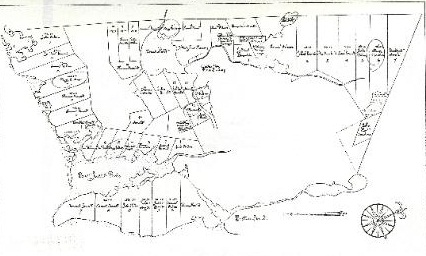
1724 map of the 1657 Pettaquamscutt Purchase. John Porter gave much of his Pettaquamscutt land to the Gardiner children of Herodias.

While the reasons that Herodias chose to leave Gardiner were not made apparent in her testimony, a major part of the reason was playing out in court across the Narragansett Bay. In May 1665, at the same time that George Gardiner appeared before the Assembly in Newport to answer the petition of Herodias, an "ancient woman" named Margaret Porter complained to the Assembly in Kings Town that her husband, John Porter, had left her, leaving her in such a necessitous state that she had become dependent on her children for her daily support, "to her very great grief of heart." Porter was a very prominent and wealthy citizen of Portsmouth, who was one of the five original purchasers of Pettaquamscutt from the Indian sachems, a huge tract of land that would later become South Kingstown, Rhode Island. Porter's estate, both real and personal, was secured by the Assembly until he made adequate compensation to his wife, which he did the following month, apparently to her satisfaction, and he was thus released from the restraint.

Soon, Herodias was living with Porter, initially under the pretense of being his house servant. In October 1667 an indictment was made "against Mr. John Porter of Narragansett in the King's Province and Harrud Long alias Gardiner for that they are suspected to cohabit and so to live in way of incontinency." The following May, Porter appeared in court and was acquitted, and the next October Herodias was similarly charged, and acquitted as well. According to most writers on the subject, Porter eventually married Herodias, and she co-signed several deeds with him in 1671. In the early 1670s Porter made large conveyances of his Pettaquamscutt lands to the Gardiner children of Herodias, and also made a conveyance to Herodias' son Thomas Hicks of Flushing, New York.

The death date for Herodias is not known. Miller and Stanton say that she survived John Porter, but Porter's death date is also unknown. He was still alive on 25 April 1674 when he was involved in a land deed, but was called deceased many years later, on 8 April 1692, when the children of Herodias appeared at a meeting of the Pettaquamscutt purchasers as "the assigns of John Porter, deceased."

== Family ==
Herodias had two known children with her first husband, John Hicks: Hannah and Thomas Hicks, and seven more children with her second husband, George Gardiner: Benoni, Henry, George, William, Nicholas, Dorcas and Rebecca Gardiner.

== Notable descendants ==
- Daisy Gardner (born September 24, 1976) is an American television writer and comedian who is best known for her work as a writer on the NBC series 30 Rock, Showtime's Californication, Modern Family, and Comedy Central's South Park. She also appears on TruTV Presents: World's Dumbest... as a commentator.
- Earl W. Bascom (1906-1995), cowboy artist and sculptor, rodeo pioneer and champion, inventor, Hollywood actor, hall of fame inductee
- Karen Carpenter (1950-1983), singer and drummer
- Victor French (1934-1989), Hollywood actor and producer
- Harold B. Lee (1899-1973), educator, American religious leader
- Charles Marion Russell, (1864-1926), cowboy artist, Society of Illustrators Hall of Fame inductee

== See also ==
- List of early settlers of Rhode Island
- Colony of Rhode Island and Providence Plantations
