= John Porter (settler) =

New England settler (c.1605–1674)

- Born: ca. 1605
- Died: after 25 April 1674 (aged 68–69)
- Education: Considerable, based on his committee appointments
- Occupations: Assistant, Commissioner, Selectman
- Spouse(s): (1) Margaret (______) Odding (2) Herodias (Long) Gardiner
- Children: Hannah

John Porter (c.1605–1674) was an early colonist in New England and a signer of the Portsmouth Compact, establishing the first government in what became the Colony of Rhode Island and Providence Plantations. He joined the Roxbury church with his wife Margaret in 1633, but few other records are found of him while in the Massachusetts Bay Colony until he became involved with John Wheelwright and Anne Hutchinson during what is known as the Antinomian Controversy. He and many others were disarmed for signing a petition in support of Wheelwright and were compelled to leave the colony. Porter joined a group of more than 20 men in signing the Portsmouth Compact for a new government, and they settled on Rhode Island where they established the town of Portsmouth. Here Porter became very active in civic affairs, serving on numerous committees over a period of two decades and being elected for several terms as Assistant, Selectman, and Commissioner. He was named in Rhode Island's Royal Charter of 1663 as one of the ten Assistants to the Governor.

In 1658, Porter joined several others in purchasing a large tract of land on the west side of Narragansett Bay, called the Pettaquamscutt Purchase, which became South Kingstown, Rhode Island. He eventually moved to his new land, leaving his aging wife behind. She sued for support, and the sympathetic court impounded Porter's estate until he made restitution, which he did within a few months. Porter later had a relationship with Herodias Gardiner, the former common-law wife of George Gardiner; he was charged with cohabiting with her but was acquitted. He might not have married her, but she did cosign several deeds with him in 1671.

Porter had only one known child, Hannah, who married a son of Portsmouth Compact signer Samuel Wilbore. His step-daughter Sarah Odding married compact signer Philip Sherman.

== Life ==
John Porter, born roughly 1605, arrived in New England in 1633, presumably with his wife Margaret, step-daughter Sarah Odding, and daughter Hannah, when he and his wife Margaret were listed as members of the church at Roxbury in the Massachusetts Bay Colony. There are few, if any, records of him in Roxbury, or his next residence of Boston, until a major theological rift arose in the colony, often called the Antinomian Controversy, when he became attracted to the preachings of the dissident ministers John Wheelwright and Anne Hutchinson, signing a petition in support of Wheelwright. Following the banishment of these two individuals from the Massachusetts colony, Porter and many other followers were disarmed when on 20 November 1637 he and others were ordered to deliver up all guns, pistols, swords, powder and shot because the "opinions and revelations of Mr. Wheelwright and Mrs. Hutchinson have seduced and led into dangerous errors many of the people here in New England."

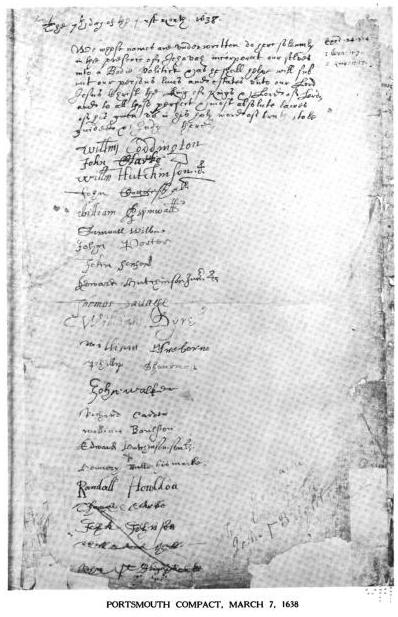
Portsmouth Compact with Porter's signature seventh on the list

Scores of the followers of Wheelwright and Hutchinson were ordered out of the Massachusetts colony, but before leaving, a group of them, including Porter, signed what is sometimes called the Portsmouth Compact, establishing a non-sectarian civil government upon the universal consent of the inhabitants, with a Christian focus. Planning initially to settle in New Netherland, the group was persuaded by Roger Williams to purchase some land of the Indians on the Narragansett Bay. This they did, settling on the north east end of Aquidneck Island, and establishing a settlement they called Pocasset, but in 1639 changing the name to Portsmouth. William Coddington was elected the first chief magistrate of the settlement, not being called Governor, but instead using the Biblical title of Judge.

Porter was in Portsmouth by May 1638 when he was present at a general meeting, and a year later was ordered to survey all nearby lands and make a map or a plot. For more than two decades Porter was very active in the colony, serving on a multitude of committees, and in other civic roles. In 1640 he was elected to his first of six terms as Assistant to the President, and then much later, in 1658, he was chosen as a Commissioner for three years. In 1661 he was on a committee to raise money for obtaining a royal charter, and when the charter was delivered in November 1663, he was named as one of the ten Assistants to the Governor. In January 1658 Porter joined a group of other settlers in buying from some Indian sachems a large tract of land on the west side of the Narragansett Bay called the Pettaquamscutt Purchase, a tract which would later become South Kingstown.

Within a few years of the purchase, Porter moved to his new land without his wife, and in May 1665 she petitioned the Assembly that her husband did not give her suitable care, and had left her, causing her to be dependent on her children, and desiring suitable provision from Porter's estate for her support. The court, satisfied that the complaints were valid and "having a deep sense upon their hearts of this sad condition which this poor ancient matron is by this means reduced into," ordered that the real and personal estate of Porter remaining in their jurisdiction be secured until his wife was given appropriate support. The following month Porter made ample provision for his wife, and was thus released from the restraint upon his estate.

During the next few years Porter consummated a relationship with Herodias Gardiner, the former common-law wife of George Gardiner. In October 1667 an indictment was made "against Mr. John Porter of Narragansett in the King's Province and Harrud Long alias Gardiner for that they are suspected to cohabit and so to live in way of incontinency." The following May, Porter appeared in court and was acquitted, and the next October Herodias was similarly charged, and acquitted as well. It is uncertain if Porter ever married Herodias, but she co-signed several deeds with him in 1671.

== Family and descendants ==
With his wife Margaret, Porter only had one known child, Hannah Porter, who married Samuel Wilbur, Jr., the son of another signer of the Portsmouth Compact, Samuel Wilbore. This couple had a daughter, Abigail, who married Caleb Arnold, the son of Governor Benedict Arnold. By an earlier marriage, Porter's wife, Margaret, had a daughter named Sarah Odding who married yet another signer of the Portsmouth Compact, Philip Sherman.

Notable descendants of John Porter include Commodore Oliver Hazard Perry, American hero of the Great Lakes during the War of 1812; his younger brother Commodore Matthew C. Perry, who compelled the opening of Japan to the West with the Convention of Kanagawa in 1854; and Stephen Arnold Douglas who debated Abraham Lincoln in 1858 before a senate race and later lost to him in the 1860 presidential election. Also among Porter's descendants is Rhode Island colonial deputy governor George Hazard.

== See also ==
- List of early settlers of Rhode Island
- Colony of Rhode Island and Providence Plantations
