= George Gardiner (settler) =

Settler (1608/15–c.1677)

- Born: 1608 to 1615
- Died: c. 1677
- Other name: George Gardner
- Occupations: Constable, Sergeant, Ensign, Commissioner, Juryman
- Spouse(s): (1) Herodias (Long) Hicks (2) Lydia Ballou
- Children: (first wife): Benoni, Henry, George, William, Nicholas, Dorcas, Rebecca; (second wife): Joseph, Robert, Lydia, Mary, Peregrine

George Gardiner (1608/1615 - c. 1677), sometimes spelled Gardner, was an early inhabitant of Newport in the Colony of Rhode Island and Providence Plantations, and one of the original settlers of Aquidneck Island. He held some minor offices within the colony in the early 1640s, shortly after which he began a common-law marriage with Herodias (Long) Hicks, who came to live with him after separating from her first husband. This relationship lasted for nearly 20 years, after which Herodias petitioned the court to have Gardiner leave her alone, and she left Newport to go west of the Narragansett Bay and live with John Porter, a land-rich settler who was one of the original purchasers of the Pettaquamscutt lands (later South Kingstown, Rhode Island).

Gardiner apparently had seven children with Herodias, and after her departure, five more with subsequent wife Lydia Ballou. His family produced a large number of descendants. A grandson, John Gardner served as Deputy Governor of the Rhode Island colony.

== Life ==
George Gardiner was one of the earliest settlers of the Colony of Rhode Island and Providence Plantations, and first appears in the public record in 1638, when he was admitted as an inhabitant of Portsmouth, on Aquidneck Island. A genealogy published in 1937 identified him with the George Gardner, baptized in 1599/1600 at Great Greenford, Middlesex, England, son of Michael and Margaret (Browne) Gardiner. They further identify George with the groom in a 1630 marriage at St. James, Clerkenwell, London to Sara Slaughter. However, prominent genealogist G. Andrews Moriarty demonstrated that evidence for this identification was lacking, and that the identification was unlikely. Moriarty's strongest evidence against this arrangement is that Gardiner would have sired five children while between the age of 67 and 74, which, though possible, is highly improbable, and that "no critical genealogist can accept the identification" unless supporting evidence were to be found. He gives a birth date in the range of 1608 to 1615 as being far more likely for the New England George Gardiner, and concludes that there is no evidence for an earlier marriage of this man, nor to assign his oldest children to a spouse other than Herodias (Long) Hicks.

Gardiner followed William Coddington to Newport in 1639, but his name was not on the list of the nine men who signed an agreement to establish the new government there. He was a Newport freeman in December 1639 and a land owner there the following year when he had 58 acres recorded. He was named as Constable and Senior Sergeant in 1642, and was an Ensign two years later. At about this time he commenced a relationship with Herodias (Long) Hicks, a woman who has been generally referred to as his common-law wife. John Hicks, the previous husband of Herodias, was in the process of obtaining a divorce from her in Rhode Island in December 1643, when he sent a letter from Flushing, New Netherland to Rhode Island magistrate John Coggeshall. Hicks also eventually obtained a divorce from her in New Netherland, charging her with adultery.

During the next two decades Gardiner and Herodias had many children, and in the mid-1650s Herodias became a Quaker convert. In May 1658, Herodias, "with her babe at her breast" (her daughter Rebecca) traveled from Newport to her former residence in Weymouth in the Massachusetts Bay Colony to deliver her religious testimony, accompanied by her friend Mary Stanton. The women had made a very difficult journey through a wilderness of more than 60 miles, made all the more perilous by the fact that Massachusetts had banished any known Quakers living within the colony, and had forbidden others from entering as missionaries. Upon her arrival in the Bay Colony, Herodias was taken before Governor John Endicott, who sentenced the two women to be whipped with ten lashes from a threefold knotted whip of cords. Following the whipping, Herodias spent 14 days in jail.

In August 1662, Gardiner and Robert Stanton, also of Newport, purchased a large tract of land in the "Narragansett country," just west of the Pettaquamscutt Purchase. A few years later, after living together for nearly 20 years, a rift developed between Gardiner and Herodias, and in May 1665 he appeared before the General Assembly upon the petition of Herodias, who "now desired...that the estate and labor he had of mine, he may allow it me, and house upon my land I may enjoy without molestation and that he may allow me my child to bring up, with maintenance for her, and that he be restrained from troubling me more." By this time she had already left Gardiner, and was living in Pettaquamscutt (later South Kingstown) with John Porter. Gardiner soon thereafter married Lydia Ballou, who was his wife in June 1668 when he was made one of the overseers of the will of his father-in-law, Robert Ballou.

While Gardiner apparently remained in Newport, his children by Herodias went with their mother. He died about 1677, but was certainly dead by 14 June 1678 when his widow married William Hawkins. According to a Providence record, Gardiner left a will in Newport, but it was lost as were most Newport records following the British occupation of the city during the American Revolutionary War.

== Family and descendants ==
Gardiner had seven children by Herodias, and an additional five children with his subsequent wife Lydia. Following Gardiner's separation from Herodias, his children by her went with her to the Narragansett country and received many parcels of land from her last husband John Porter, who had substantial land holdings. Their descendants were numerous in North Kingstown and South Kingstown. George's children by his second wife, Lydia Ballou, remained in Newport. His grandson John Gardner, the son of Joseph, served as Deputy Governor of the colony for eight years between 1754 and 1764.

== See also ==
- List of early settlers of Rhode Island
- Colony of Rhode Island and Providence Plantations
