= Adele Cutts =

American socialite (1835–1899)

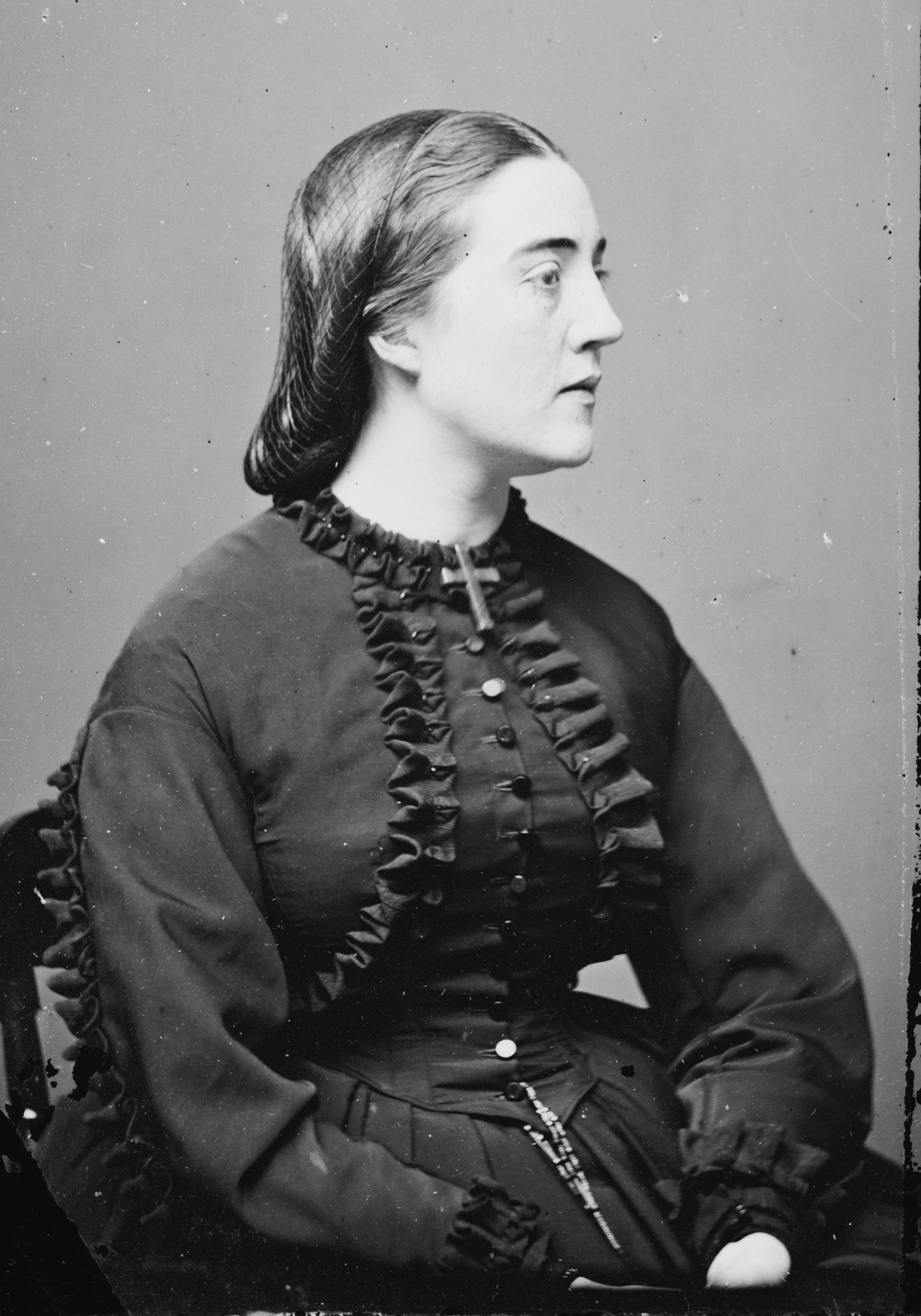
Cutts c. 1855-1865

Rose Adele Cutts (December 27, 1835 – January 26, 1899) was an American socialite who was the second wife of senator and presidential candidate Stephen A. Douglas, and the only wife of adjutant general Robert Williams. She was also the grandniece of Dolley Madison and the niece of Rose Greenhow.

== Biography ==
Rose Adele Cutts was born on December 27, 1835 to Ellen O'Neale, from a devout Maryland Catholic family, and James Madison Cutts, in her grandfather Richard Cutts's house in Washington, D.C.. James Madison Cutts was the Treasury's second Comptroller. She was the grandniece of First Lady Dolley Madison, who was her paternal grandmother Anna Payne's older sister. Her great-grand-uncle-in-law was George Washington through the marriage of his nephew George Steptoe Washington to Lucy Payne, another sister of Anna's. She first visited the White House in 1842, as a flower girl for a children's fancy ball hosted during John Tyler's presidency. She was educated in Washington D.C. When she was young she was usually called "Addie". She spent much of her youth in the company of Dolley Madison, who taught her the mores of high society, at the Madisons' Montpelier house in Virginia; when Madison died in 1849, the bereaved Adele grew lonely and returned to Washington, D.C. Throughout her life, Cutts remained a committed Catholic.

In 1856, Cutts met Illinois senator Stephen A. Douglas at a reception at the White House. Douglas fell in love with and courted her; they married on November 20, 1856. She moved to Illinois with Douglas. Though they lived primarily in Chicago, they also stayed frequently in the Tremont House and in Lake View. She entertained guests weekly at their house and threw lavish parties, and "society followed her lead". Cutts, whose upbringing was Catholic, brought up Douglas's two sons, from his previous marriage, as such. In 1858 she miscarried and became ill. The following year, she gave birth to a daughter named Ellen and suffered from puerperal fever for the next several weeks, but survived. Ellen died in June of 1860 at six months of age. She, James Madison Cutts and Ellen O'Neale were at Douglas's deathbed when he died on June 3, 1861. She withdrew from public life and ceased hosting guests for the next several years after his death. During the Civil War, Rose Greenhow, her maternal aunt, disapproved of Cutts's support for the Union; Greenhow was a Confederate spy.

She was courted again in 1865 by adjutant general Robert Williams, whom she married in January of 1866. Their six children were Robert, Ellen, Philip, Adèle, James and Mildred. Williams's military postings took the couple to the western part of the United States from 1871 to 1890. They returned to Washington D.C. after Williams was moved to the War Department. Cutts died of heart failure in Washington D.C. on January 26, 1899 and was buried in Arlington National Cemetery. Williams is interred next to her.

== Works cited ==
- Roberts, Cokie (2015). Capital dames: the Civil War and the women of Washington, 1848-1868 (1 ed.). New York, NY: Harper, an imprint of HarperCollins Publishers. ISBN 978-0-06-200276-1.
- Capers, Gerald M. (1974). "Douglas, Adèle Cutts". In James, Edward T.; James, Janet Wilson; Boyer, Paul S. (eds.). Notable American Women, 1607–1950: A Biographical Dictionary. Belknap Press. ISBN 978-0-674-62734-5.
- Osborne, Georgia Lou (1932). Brief biographies of the figurines on display in the Illinois state historical library. Springfield, Ill., Printed by authority of the State of Illinois.
- Johnson, Allen (1908). Stephen A. Douglas: A Study in American Politics. The Macmillan Company.
- Ankrom, Reg (2015). Stephen A. Douglas: the political apprenticeship, 1833-1843. Jefferson, North Carolina: McFarland & Company, Inc., Publishers. ISBN 978-0-7864-9807-9.
- Wells, Damon (1990) [1971]. Stephen Douglas: The Last Years, 1857–1861. University of Texas Press. ISBN 978-0292776357.
- Gouverneur, Marian Campbell (1911). As I Remember: Recollections of American Society During the Nineteenth Century. D. Appleton.
- Maine Historical Society (1897). Collections of the Maine historical society. Portland, The Society.
