= John Cole (judge) =

American judge and lawyer

12th Chief Justice of the Rhode Island Supreme Court
- In office February 1764 – May 1765
- Preceded by: John Banister
- Succeeded by: Joseph Russell

Personal details
- Born: 1715 North Kingstown, Rhode Island
- Died: October 1777 (aged 61–62) Providence, Rhode Island
- Spouse: Mary Updike
- Children: Edward, Elizabeth
- Parent(s): Elisha Cole and Elizabeth Dexter
- Education: Educated in Latin and Greek from private tutors
- Occupation: Lawyer, Legislator, Chief Justice

John Cole (1715 – October 1777) was an American judge and lawyer who became the 12th Chief Justice of the Rhode Island Supreme Court, serving from 1764 to 1765. Following his short tenure as Chief Justice, he became a Providence legislator, and Speaker of the Rhode Island House of Deputies. In this role he was on a committee to draft instructions to Providence citizens in regards to protesting the egregious Stamp Act passed by the British parliament to tax the American colonists.

During the lead up to the American Revolutionary War Cole was privy to the plan and execution of the burning of the British revenue schooner Gaspee that ran aground near Pawtuxet, Rhode Island. He was deeply complicit with Stephen Hopkins and other leading Providence citizens in withholding evidence from the British commission of inquiry that was established to find the instigators of the Gaspee Affair. After a year of collecting testimonies, the court dissolved, having failed to indict a single person. In 1775 Cole became the Advocate General of Rhode Island's Vice Admiralty Court, but died of smallpox just two years later.

== Early life ==
John Cole was the oldest of seven children born to Elisha Cole and Elizabeth Dexter. His paternal grandmother was the former Indian captive Susanna Cole who was the only survivor of a massacre in New Netherland. He was a great grandson of Boston's first innkeeper, Samuel Cole and also of the famed religious heretic, Anne Hutchinson.

Cole's father Elisha was a lawyer, and the family had fairly substantial financial means, but during a trip to London to handle a lawsuit in 1729, Elisha died, leaving his wife with many children, all of whom were minors. Though only 14 at the time, Cole was still able to get a good education, learning Latin and Greek from a private tutor. As a young man, Cole studied law under Daniel Updike, the colony's Attorney General, and on 17 January 1759 married Updike's daughter, Mary, in Providence.

== Career ==
Cole became a prominent lawyer, and prospered in his profession. As a rising star in Rhode Island's legal profession, he was selected as an associate judge on the Rhode Island Supreme Court in August 1763. The following May he was elevated to become Rhode Island's 12th chief justice. The biggest issue with which he was involved as the Chief Justice was the Stamp Act, which was a form of tax thrust upon the American colonies by the British parliament. Cole felt the same indignation towards the act as most of his fellow citizens. Though Cole stepped down as the Chief Justice in May 1765, he immediately became a colonial legislator representing Providence, and in this capacity responded to the Stamp Act. Cole was on a committee with former Chief Justice Stephen Hopkins to draft instructions from Providence regarding the act. The report that they produced considered the Stamp Act unconstitutional, and detrimental to the liberty of all British subjects, whether in America or in Britain. Though the Stamp Act was eventually repealed, other forms of taxation replaced it. Cole continued as a Providence legislator for a decade, and in 1767 was elected as the Speaker of the House of Deputies.

=== Gaspee Affair ===
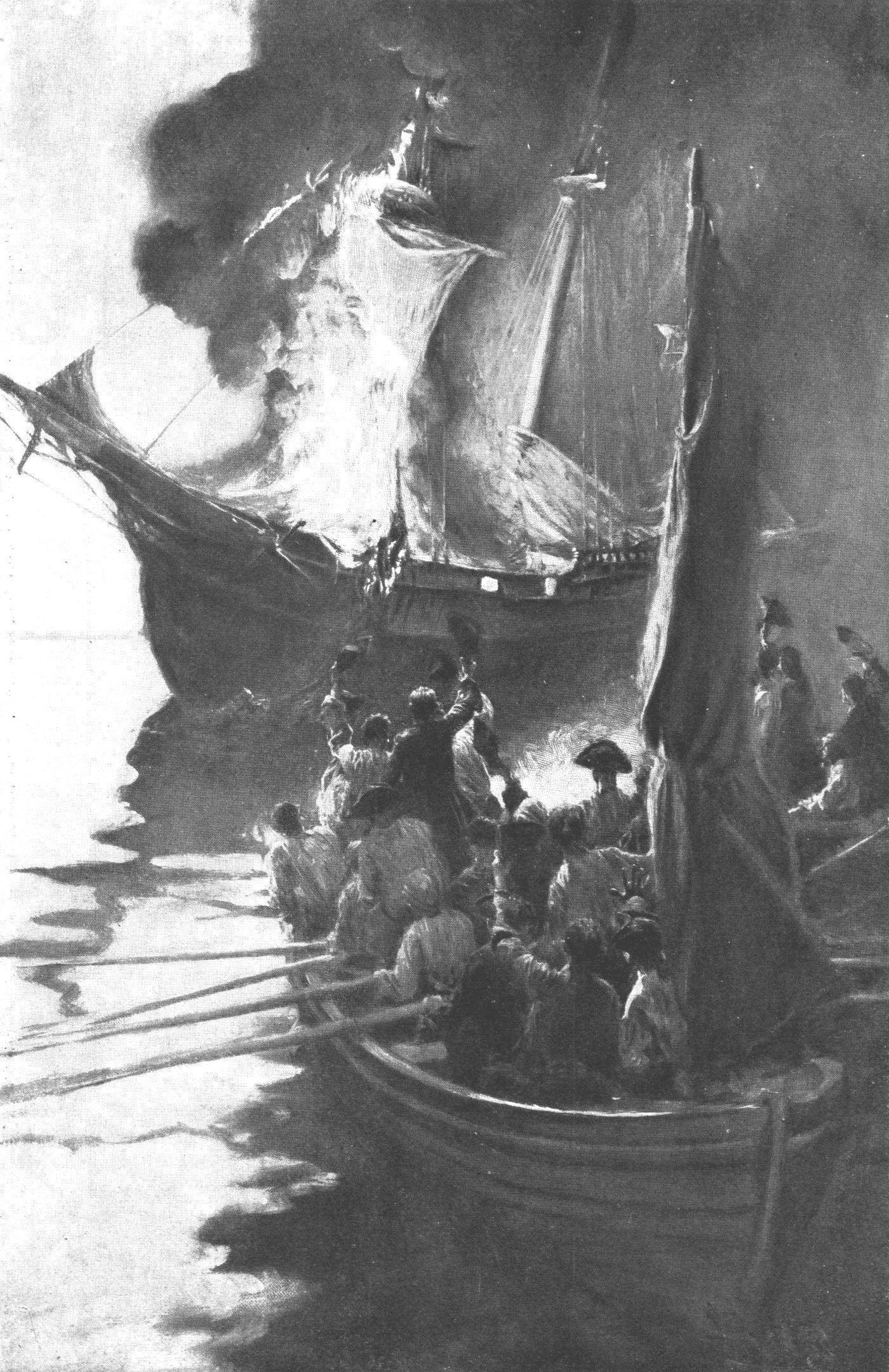
Burning of the Gaspée

One of the most important events in which Cole was involved was the Gaspee Affair, prior to the American Revolutionary War. In March 1772 Rhode Island's Deputy Governor Darius Sessions, working in Providence, sent a letter of concern to Governor Joseph Wanton in Newport, having consulted with Chief Justice Stephen Hopkins. Sessions expressed alarm that the Royal Navy revenue schooner Gaspee had been cruising the Narragansett Bay, stopping and searching local merchantmen to see if they were violating the Navigation Acts. In the letter Sessions wrote:

I have consulted with the Chief Justice [Hopkins] thereon, who is of the opinion that no commander of any vessel has any right to use any authority in the Body of the Colony without previously applying to the Governor and showing his warrant for so doing and also being sworn to a due exercise of his office--and this he informs me has been the common custom in this Colony.

Sessions went on to request that the governor take measures to bring the ship's captain to account. A chain of threatening correspondence ensued between the governor and the captain of the Gaspee, Lieutenant William Dudingston, and Dudingston's superior, Admiral John Montagu. During the afternoon of 9 June 1772, the Gaspee ran aground near Pawtuxet, while pursuing a vessel. The vessel made it safely to Providence, and its captain got the word out that the Gaspee was stranded. Cole was among a large group of Providence citizens that assembled at James Sabin's Inn that evening to plan an attack on the stranded vessel. During the night, a large party of these men boarded eight long boats, rowed out to the Gaspee, captured its crew, and set the vessel on fire, burning it to the waterline. Officially, Sessions was outraged at the incident, and offered the colony's assistance in bringing the perpetrators to justice. To ameliorate retribution by the Crown, Rhode Island officials took visible steps to find the culprits who burned the ship. Behind the scenes, however, Sessions and Hopkins did all they could to thwart any attempts to identify and find the attackers. A royal commission was appointed by the Crown to investigate the incident, which demanded that any indicted person be sent to London for trial. This prompted the colonists to form the Committees of Correspondence. Loyalist Massachusetts Governor Thomas Hutchinson further aggravated the colonists sensitivities by urging the Crown to rescind the Rhode Island charter.

With his solid legal background, Cole was brought into the Rhode Island Committee of Correspondence, and conferred with Sessions, Chief Justice Hopkins and Moses Brown on a course of action. The four men drafted a letter to Massachusetts' statesman Samuel Adams, who replied, urging Rhode Island to remain defiant, or at least to stall matters by appealing the creation of the royal commission. Though Governor Wanton was put at the head of this commission, he was nevertheless compliant with Sessions' and Hopkins' attempts to frustrate the aims of the commission. Sessions, Hopkins, and others coordinated their efforts to lose evidence, threaten potential witnesses, and discredit those who testified.

The royal commission of inquiry summoned a number of Providence leaders to present their testimonies, among them being Cole. While several of those called found ways of avoiding the summons, Cole was one who testified, for which he was later ridiculed. On 3 June 1773 he made a statement under oath in Newport, testifying that he was at James Sabin's Tavern in Providence the evening of the incident, and didn't leave until some time between 11 and 12 o'clock in the evening. He stated that at one point he got up to look through the shutter onto the street, and that some unidentified person there had said that the Gaspee had run aground. He stated he knew nothing further of the incident. Of course his testimony was a fabrication, and had been carefully coordinated with others who were compelled to testify. The vast majority of Rhode Island's citizens were supportive of the attackers, and kept quiet about their identities. A year after the incident, the royal commission was terminated without a single indictment.

=== Late career and death ===
As the threat of war became imminent, Cole was appointed in 1775 as the Advocate General of the newly formed Vice Admiralty Court, and held this position until his death. In 1777 he was urged to get inoculated for the serious smallpox disease, which was widespread at the time. Instead of preventing the disease, Cole became infected, and died from it in October 1777.

== Family and ancestry ==
John Cole and Mary Updike had three or four known children. His oldest child, a son, was born about 1761, and died in October 1767, aged 6 years, when he fell from the loft of a barn. He had a son named Edward, but it is not known if this is the same as his oldest son. He had a daughter, Elizabeth, who married Ichabod Wade of Providence, and it is with this daughter that his widow lived. His other child, Anstis (1767-1804), died unmarried in Rehoboth, Massachusetts of a "distressing indisposition of many years". Cole's widow, Mary, survived him by more than three decades, dying in Providence on 21 June 1811 in her 87th year; she was buried in Saint John's Church Cemetery in Providence.

Cole's immediate ancestry is found in John O. Austin's Genealogical Dictionary of Rhode Island. The ancestry of Cole's grandmother, Susanna Cole, was published by John D. Champlin in 1913 and 1914. The Dexter ancestry of Cole's mother is from the Dexter genealogy (1905), supplemented with more recent scholarship from The Great Migration series as cited within the chart.

Ancestors of John Cole (judge)

8. Samuel Cole (c. 1597 - c. 1667)
4. John Cole (c. 1626 - c. 1707)
9. Ann (died before 1647)
2. Elisha Cole (1675 - c. 1729)
20. Edward Hutchinson (1564 - 1631)
10. William Hutchinson (1586 - 1641)
21. Susanna (c. 1564 - c. 1645)
5. Susanna Hutchinson (1633 - 1713)
22. Francis Marbury (1555 - 1611)
11. Anne Marbury (1591 - 1643)
23. Bridget Dryden (c. 1563 - 1645)
1. John Cole (1715 - 1777)
24. Thomas Dexter (c. 1594 - 1676-7)
12. Thomas Dexter (born c. 1624)
6. John Dexter (1656 - 1721)
13. Elizabeth possibly Vincent
3. Elizabeth Dexter (1683 - 1756)
28. Andrew Hallett
14. Andrew Hallett (1607 - c. 1684)
29. Beatrice Knote
7. Mehitabel Hallett (c. 1663 - 1692)
30. Anthony Bessey
15. Anne Bessey (born c. 1641)
31. Jane (died 1693)

=== Bibliography ===
- Anderson, Robert Charles (1995). The Great Migration Begins, Immigrants to New England 1620–1633. Vol. III P-W. Boston: New England Historic Genealogical Society. ISBN 0-88082-044-6.
- Anderson, Robert C.; Sanborn, George F. Jr.; Sanborn, Melinde L. (1999). The Great Migration, Immigrants to New England 1634–1635. Vol. I A–B. Boston: New England Historic Genealogical Society. ISBN 0-88082-110-8.
- Anderson, Robert Charles (2003). The Great Migration, Immigrants to New England 1634–1635. Vol. III G-H. Boston: New England Historic Genealogical Society. ISBN 0-88082-158-2.
- Austin, John Osborne (1887). Genealogical Dictionary of Rhode Island. Albany, New York: J. Munsell's Sons. ISBN 978-0-8063-0006-1.
- Champlin, John Denison (1913). "The Tragedy of Anne Hutchinson". Journal of American History. 5 (3). Twin Falls, Idaho: 1–11.
- Champlin, John Denison (1914). "The Ancestry of Anne Hutchinson". New York Genealogical and Biographical Record. XLV. New York: New York Genealogical and Biographical Society: 17–26.
- Cole, J. T. (1889). History of Washington and Kent Counties Rhode Island. New York: W. W. Preston and Company.
- Opdyke, Charles Wilson (1889). The op Dyck Genealogy. Albany, NY: Weed, Parsons and Company.
- Staples, William R. (1845). The Documentary History of the Destruction of the Gaspee. Providence: Knowles, Vose, and Anthony. p. 45. "John Cole documentary destruction Gaspee."
- Updike, Wilkins (1907). A history of the Episcopal Church in Narragansett, Rhode Island: including a history of other Episcopal churches in the state. Vol. 1. Boston: Printed and published by D.B. Updike.

Online sources

- "Gaspee Virtual Archives". Gaspee.org. 16 July 2014.
