= Samuel Cole (settler) =

- Born: by about 1597
- Died: winter 1666–1667; Boston, Massachusetts
- Education: signed documents; inventory included several books
- Occupation(s): Innkeeper, confectioner
- Spouse(s): (1) Ann _______ (2) Margaret (________) Greene (3) Ann (Mansfield) Keayne
- Children: (all with 1st wife) Catherine, Elizabeth, John, Mary

Samuel Cole (c. 1597–1666/67) was an early settler of Boston in the Massachusetts Bay Colony, arriving with the Winthrop Fleet in 1630. He was an innkeeper and confectioner, and in 1634 established the first house of entertainment in the colony, called Cole's Inn and referenced by Henry Wadsworth Longfellow in his play John Endicott as the Three Mariners.

Born by 1597, Cole and his family arrived in New England with John Winthrop in 1630, and established themselves on the Shawmut Peninsula, which soon became the town of Boston. He and his wife Ann were among the earliest members of the Boston church, having joined in the autumn of 1630. He opened the first tavern in the area on 4 March 1634 in what later became downtown Boston, but in 1645 relocated his business to the future Merchants Row between State Street and Faneuil Hall. Cole's establishment was a center of social and political life in Boston, and Governor Henry Vane had brought the Narragansett Indian sachem Miantonomoh, with his retinue, for a meal there. Henry Wadsworth Longfellow included Cole and his house of entertainment in his play John Endicott set in the early 1660s.

As a member of the Boston Church, Cole was caught up in the Antinomian Controversy that shook the young colony between 1636 and 1638. He signed a petition in support of the minister John Wheelwright who was banished from the colony, and after being threatened with losing his weapons, he signed a remission, calling his support of Wheelwright an error. While during the early days of the colony Cole was considered well off, and contributed to various causes, by 1661 he was suffering financial losses and in June of that year was granted 300 acres of land for being a respected and useful member of the community. Cole was married three times, and had at least four children, all with his first wife, Ann. His son, John, married Susanna, the only person to survive the massacre killing her famed mother, Anne Hutchinson, and many of her siblings. Cole wrote his will in December 1666, and died in Boston shortly thereafter, with his will being proved the following February.

== Life ==
Samuel Cole, born by about 1597, arrived in Boston in the Massachusetts Bay Colony with the Winthrop Fleet in 1630, being accompanied by his wife Ann, and likely all four of his known children. Several online accounts say that Cole was from Mersea in Essex, but it was the first husband of his second wife who came from that place, and Anderson finds no evidence supporting this provenance for him. He and his wife joined the Boston church as members #42 and #43, indicating that they joined in the autumn of 1630. He requested to be made a freeman on 19 October 1630, and took the freeman's oath the following May.

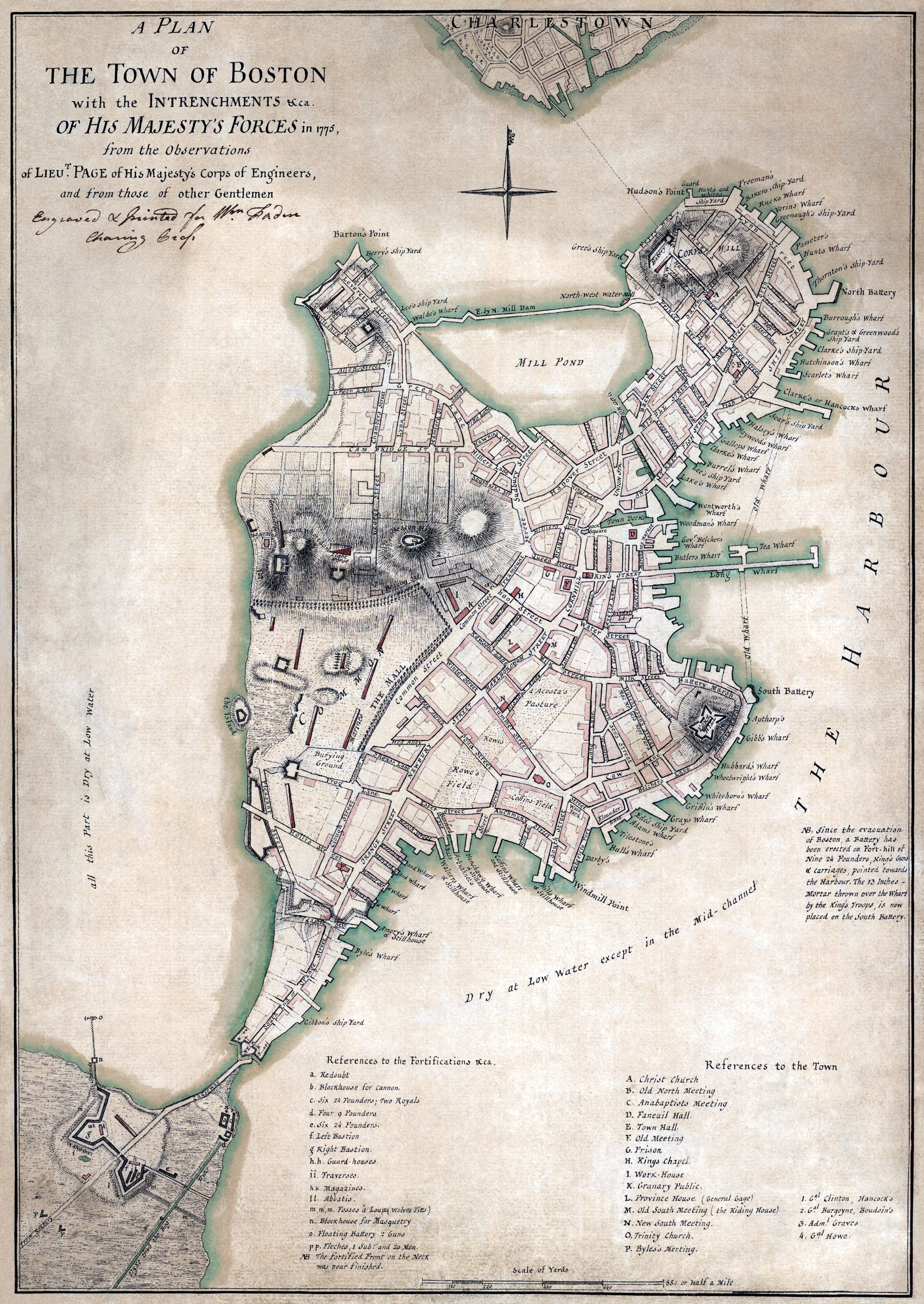
The Shawmut Peninsula (now downtown Boston) in 1775 still looked much as it did during Cole's time there, but today much of the bay has been filled and developed.

Boston magistrate John Winthrop wrote in his journal on the date of 4 March 1634 that "Samuel Cole set up the first house for common entertainment," this being the first tavern or inn in the colony. While claims have been made that this was the first tavern in the American colonies, there is evidence that it was predated by about 20 years in Jamestown, Virginia. The establishment is commonly called Cole's Inn, but was called the Three Mariners by Henry Wadsworth Longfellow in his play, John Endicott. Cole, besides being called an innkeeper, styled himself as a confectioner and "comfitmaker" in several deeds. In August 1636 he attended a meeting of the town's wealthier inhabitants, and donated 10 shillings towards the maintenance for a master of a free school. Also in 1636, the colony's governor, Henry Vane brought the Narragansett Indian sachem Miantonomoh, with his retinue, to Boston, and they were served a meal there. Drake, wondering how the guests were seated since the natives were not accustomed to chairs, surmised that they all sat on the floor in a circle, with the pot of meat placed in the middle.

As with most members of the Boston church, Cole became caught up in the events of the Antinomian Controversy in 1636 and 1637, and signed a petition on behalf of the Reverend John Wheelwright who was later banished from the colony. On 20 November 1637 Cole was disarmed for this participation, and rather than give up his weapons, he, two days later, was the first to sign an acknowledgment that "it was ill done, and unwarrantably, as transgressing therein the rule of due honor to authority, and of modesty, and submission in private persons, and therefore I desire my name may be put out of it."

On the last day of February 1638, Cole sold the southern part of a new mansion house in Boston where he "lately dwelled" to Captain Robert Sedgwicke of Charlestown for £200. The other half of the house was "assured to" Thomas Mariott and others. This same year the Ancient and Honorable Artillery Company was founded, and he was one of its charter members. On 20 May 1645 Cole sold his inn to George Halsell, and on the same day bought another property of Valentine Hill where he opened a new inn. The location of this new establishment relative to later landmarks was on the west side of Merchants Row, about midway between State Street and Faneuil Hall. Frank Cole called it "a famous old inn [that] entertained many of the illustrious guests of the time," and also noted that Samuel Cole "had the usual experience of the publican under the rule of the Puritan" and was fined several times for overcharging his customers and had his license taken away for a time.

In addition to being the proprietor of an inn, Cole was briefly active in the affairs of the town, and from 1653 to 1657 he served as a Boston selectman, as well as being a sealer of weights and measures in 1654. While during the early days of the colony Cole was considered well off, and contributed to various causes, by 1661 he was suffering financial losses. In June of that year the General Court made a grant to him, stating that "considering that Mr. Cole was an ancient adventurer in the public stock and hath been long out of his money, been at great charges and loss in this business, hath approved himself respective and serviceable to the Court, the Court judgeth it meet to grant Mr. Samuel Cole three hundred acres..." Cole wrote his will on 21 December 1666, and died shortly thereafter, with the will proven the following February.

== In literature ==
"But the Three Mariners is an orderly house,
Most orderly, quiet, and respectable.
Lord Leigh said he could be as quiet here
As at the Governor's. And have I not
King Charles Twelve Good Rules, all framed and glazed
Hanging in my best parlor?."

— Samuel Cole in Henry Wadsworth Longfellow's, John Endicott

Cole is featured during a scene in Henry Wadsworth Longfellow's play entitled John Endicott, about the Bay colony's sometimes fiery governor. The play takes place in the early 1660s, shortly after four Quakers, known as the Boston martyrs, have been executed in Boston. During a conversation at Cole's Inn, Cole discusses his house of entertainment. The reference to Lord Leigh concerns the time when Lord Ley, Earl of Marlborough visited Boston, shortly after Henry Vane lost the governorship to John Winthrop in May 1637. Though invited to lodge at Winthrop's house, the young aristocrat preferred to stay at Cole's Inn, saying that it was well governed, and that he could be as private there as elsewhere. This was one of many slights endured by Winthrop during the colony's difficulties from 1636 to 1638.

== Family ==
Cole's first wife, Ann, died shortly after their arrival in New England, by one account, but certainly before October 1647, at which time Cole was married to the widow Margaret Green, a daughter-in-law of Isaac Green of Mersey, Essex, England. Following the death of his second wife, he married in Boston on 16 October 1660 Ann (Mansfield) Keayne, the widow of Robert Keayne. Ann's sister Elizabeth was the wife of Boston minister John Wilson.

Cole's children were all with his first wife, and very likely all born in England. Catherine (born roughly 1622) married Edmund Gross and Elizabeth (born roughly 1624) married Edward Weeden, the son of Samuel. The only known son, John (born 1625), married in Boston on 30 December 1651 Susanna Hutchinson, the only child of William and Anne Hutchinson to survive the Indian massacre in New Netherland that killed her mother and many of her siblings. Susanna had been taken captive for several years before being returned to family members in Boston. The Hutchinsons had been very close neighbors of the Coles in Boston before Mrs. Hutchinson was forced to leave the Massachusetts Bay Colony in early 1638 following the events of the Antinomian Controversy. The fourth child of Samuel and Ann Cole was Mary (born roughly 1628) who first married a Mr. "Gawdren" (a name not known in early New England at this time and possibly a corruption of another name), and married second on 7 January 1652/3 Edmund Jackson. Among Cole's well known descendants, through his son John, are Stephen Arnold Douglas, who lost to Abraham Lincoln in the 1860 presidential election, and Willard Mitt Romney, who lost to incumbent Barack Obama in 2012.

== See also ==
- Puritanism
- Antinomian Controversy
- tavern
