= Susanna Cole =

Colonial Indian captive

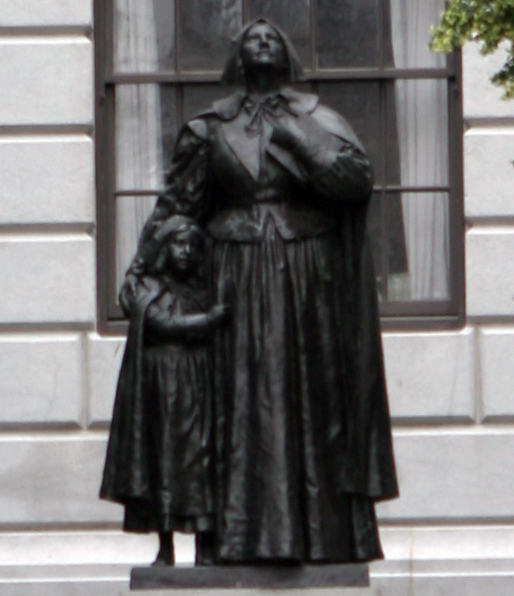
- Susanna as a child with her mother, Anne Hutchinson, in a bronze memorial at the Massachusetts State House
- Born: baptized 15 November 1633; Alford, Lincolnshire, England
- Died: by 14 December 1713; North Kingstown, Rhode Island
- Other name: Susanna Hutchinson
- Known for: Captivity among Siwanoy during Kieft's War
- Spouse: John Cole
- Children: Susanna, Samuel, Mary, John, Anne, John, Hannah, William, Francis, Elizabeth, Elisha
- Parent(s): William Hutchinson and Anne (Marbury) Hutchinson

Susanna Cole (née Hutchinson; 1633 – before 14 December 1713) was the lone survivor of a Native American attack in which many of her siblings were killed, as well as her famed mother Anne Hutchinson. She was taken captive following the attack and held for several years before her release.

Susanna Hutchinson was born in Alford, Lincolnshire, England and was less than a year old when her family sailed from England to New England in 1634. She was less than five when her family settled on Aquidneck Island (later Rhode Island) in the Narragansett Bay following her mother's banishment from Massachusetts during the Antinomian Controversy. Her father died when she was about eight years old, and she, her mother, and six of her siblings left Rhode Island to live in New Netherland. They settled in an area that became the far northeastern section of The Bronx in New York City, near the Westchester County line. The family found themselves caught in the middle of Kieft's War between the local Siwanoy Indians and the colony of New Netherland, and they were all massacred in August 1643, except for Susanna. She was taken captive by the Native Americans, and was traded back to the English three years later.

When Susanna was released from her Native American captivity, she was taken to Boston where her oldest brother and an older sister lived, was re-introduced into English society, and married John Cole at the age of 18, the son of Boston innkeeper Samuel Cole. They lived in Boston for a few years, but moved by 1663 to the Narragansett country of Rhode Island (later North Kingstown) to look after the lands of her oldest brother Edward Hutchinson. Here the couple remained and raised a large family. Susanna was still alive in 1707 when given administration of her husband's estate, but was deceased by December 1713 when her son William took receipts concerning his parents' estate.

== Early life ==
Susanna Hutchinson was baptized in Alford, Lincolnshire on 15 November 1633. She was the youngest child of William and Anne Hutchinson to accompany her parents on the voyage from England to New England in 1634. She was the couple's 14th child, of whom 11 survived to make the trip to the New World; a 15th child was born in New England. The family settled in Boston and lived across the street from magistrate John Winthrop, who was a judge during the civil trial in 1637 that led to her mother's banishment from the Massachusetts colony. While Hutchinson was still very young, her mother hosted popular religious discussions at their home. Her mother's religious views were at odds with the orthodoxy of the Puritan ministers; she helped to create a major division in the Boston church and an untenable situation for the colony's leaders. The family was forced to leave Massachusetts; they settled with many of her mother's supporters on Rhode Island in the Narragansett Bay, establishing the settlement of Portsmouth which soon became a part of the Colony of Rhode Island and Providence Plantations. Susanna was less than five years old when the family left Boston, and she was about eight when her father died in Portsmouth.

Susanna's widowed mother was frightened at the prospect of Massachusetts gaining influence or control over Rhode Island. Consequently, she moved to the part of New Netherland that later became The Bronx in New York City, along with her six youngest children, an older son, a son-in-law, and some servants. The Dutch were engaged in Kieft's War against the Siwanoy Indians during the family's tenure there. In August 1643, Siwanoy attacked the emigrant household and killed all members of the family, except for nine-year-old Susanna. According to one story, Susanna's red hair spared her from the slaughter, while another account claimed that the girl was out picking blueberries some distance from the house and hid in the crevice of Split Rock. In any event, the attackers took her captive and held her for several years.

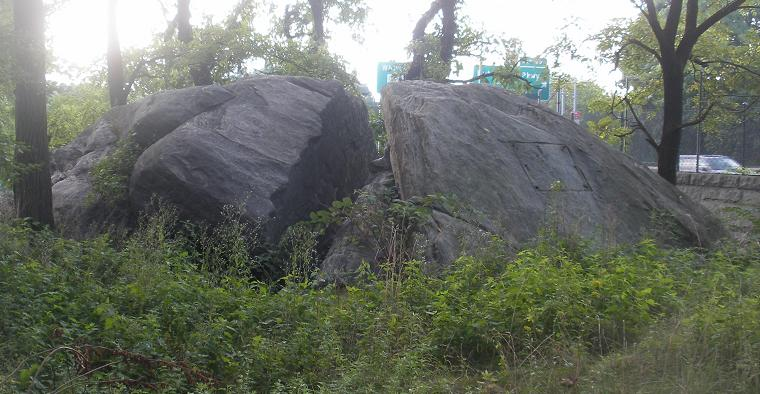
Split Rock, where one legend says that Susanna Hutchinson hid during the Indian massacre which killed her mother and siblings

Massachusetts governor John Winthrop provides an account of Susanna in his journal, under the date of July 1646:

A daughter of Mrs. Hutchinson was carried away by the Indians near the Dutch, when her mother and others were killed by them; and upon the peace concluded between the Dutch and the same Indians, she was returned to the Dutch governor, who restored her to her friends here. She was about eight years old, when she was taken, and continued with them about four years, and she had forgot her own language, and all her friends, and was loath to have come from the Indians.

Sources indicate that during her time with the Siwanoys, Susanna bore a son to Siwanoy sachem Wampage I - Ninham-Wampage, who would later become Wampage II.

Winthrop says that Hutchinson was captive for about four years, although his journal makes clear that her captivity lasted less than three years. When she returned to Boston, her living siblings were her oldest brother Edward, brother Samuel, and her two oldest surviving sisters Faith (the wife of Thomas Savage) and Bridget (the wife of John Sanford). Faith lived in Mount Wollaston, about ten miles south of Boston; Bridget lived in Portsmouth, Rhode Island; and Samuel's residence is unknown. Only her brother Edward is known to have lived in Boston proper, and it is likely that Susanna came to live with him and his family. On 30 December 1651, she married John Cole in Boston, the son of Boston innkeeper Samuel Cole, who had established Boston's first tavern in 1634.

== Adult life ==
Susanna and John Cole began raising a family in Boston, but they went to look after her brother's land in the Narragansett country by 1663, which was then in disputed territory but later became North Kingstown, Rhode Island. Here the Coles lived for the remainder of their lives, rearing many children. The will of John Cole's father Samuel Cole, dated 21 December 1666, left a property at Bendall's Dock in Boston to John and his children to satisfy an agreement with Susanna's brother Edward Hutchinson and uncle Samuel Hutchinson. This property was leased out in 1676, and sold in 1698 for £160.

In April 1667, John Cole deeded their house in Boston to Susanna's brother Edward and uncle Samuel, signifying that they intended to remain in Narragansett. They lived in the vicinity of Wickford, an area claimed by both Connecticut and Rhode Island. Many of the Wickford inhabitants preferred to be under the jurisdiction of Connecticut, and John Cole became a magistrate and commissioner for the area in the late 1660s under the auspices of the Connecticut government. Rhode Island was eventually given control over the Narragansett lands following many years of dispute and tension, and John Cole was made a conservator of the peace under the Rhode Island government in 1682. John died by 1707, and Susanna and her son William were given administration of his estate during that year. Susanna died by 14 December 1713, and her son William "took receipts from heirs for their full proportion of estate of deceased father and mother."

== Family and legacy ==
Susanna and John Cole had 11 children: Susanna, Samuel, Mary, John, Ann, a second John, Hannah, William, Francis, Elizabeth, and Elisha; at least 9 of them grew to maturity. Their oldest daughter Susanna married Thomas Eldred, but the fate is not known of their oldest son Samuel. Mary lived into her 60s, never marrying, and John Jr. died as a youngster. Ann married Henry Bull, the son of Jireh Bull, and grandson of Rhode Island colonial governor Henry Bull. A second John grew to maturity; Hannah married Thomas Place; and William married Ann Pinder. Francis grew to maturity; Elizabeth (1673-1744) married Robert Potter (1667-1745), grandson of original Rhode Island settler Nathaniel Potter (1616-1644); and Elisha married Elizabeth Dexter and was a Deputy or Assistant in the Rhode Island colony for many years. Among her well-known descendants are two aspirants to the United States Presidency: Stephen Arnold Douglas, who lost to Abraham Lincoln in the 1860 election, and Willard Mitt Romney, who lost to Barack Obama in 2012. Her grandson John Cole, the son of Elisha Cole, was a chief justice of the Rhode Island Supreme Court.

There have been numerous books and articles written about Susanna Cole's famous mother Anne Hutchinson, most of which mention Susanna. The novel Trouble's Daughter by Katherine Kirkpatrick presents a fictionalized account about Susanna's life with the Indians who captured her, but it also presents some of the limited historical information that is available about her.

A bronze statue in front of the Massachusetts State House in Boston displays an assumed likeness of Cole as a youngster and her mother Anne Hutchinson; it was dedicated in 1922.

== Ancestry ==
Some of Susanna's ancestry on her father's side was published by John D. Champlin in 1913, and he published much of her ancestry on her mother's side the following year.

Ancestors of Susanna Cole

16. William Hutchinson
8. John Hutchinson (1515–1565)
17. Ann
4. Edward Hutchinson (1564–1631)
9. Anne (______) Clint (1519–1586)
2. William Hutchinson (1586–1641)
5. Susanna (died c. 1645)
1. Susanna Hutchinson (1633–1713)
24. Robert Marbury (c. 1490 – 1545)
12. William Marbury (c. 1524 – 1581)
25. Katharine Williamson (c 1508 – 1525)
6. Francis Marbury (1555–1611)
26. John Lenton
13. Agnes Lenton
3. Anne Marbury (1591–1643)
28. David Dryden (c. 1500 – after 1540)
14. John Dryden (1525–1584)
29. Isabel Nicholson
7. Bridget Dryden (c. 1563 – 1645)
30. Sir John Cope (c. 1504 – 1559)
15. Elizabeth Cope (1529–1584)
31. Bridget Raleigh

== See also ==
- History of Rhode Island
- List of Indian massacres
