= Thomas Savage (major) =

English-born military officer, politician and merchant (1607–1682)

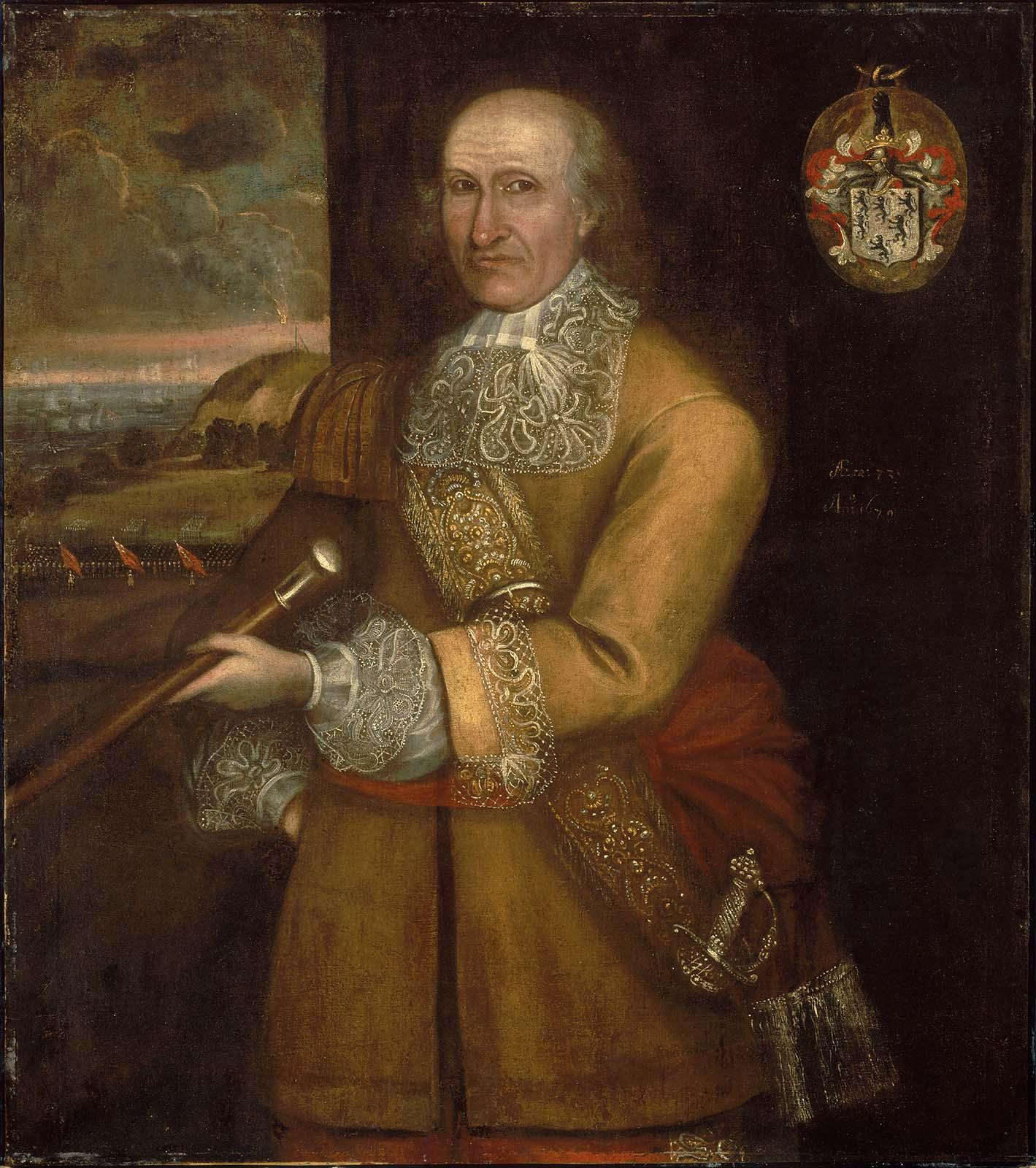
- Portrait by Thomas Smith, 1679

Speaker of the Massachusetts General Court
- In office 1659–1660
- Preceded by: Richard Russell
- Succeeded by: William Hathorne

Speaker of the Massachusetts General Court
- In office 1671
- Preceded by: Thomas Clarke
- Succeeded by: Thomas Clarke

Speaker of the Massachusetts General Court
- In office 1677–1678
- Preceded by: Peter Buckley
- Succeeded by: Richard Waldron

Personal details
- Born: c. 1607 Taunton, Somerset
- Died: February 14, 1682 (aged 74–75) Boston, Massachusetts
- Spouse(s): Faith Hutchinson (m. 1637); Mary Symmes (m. 1652)
- Children: 16
- Occupation: Military officer, politician, merchant

Military service
- Allegiance: Massachusetts
- Branch/service: Massachusetts Militia
- Rank: Major
- Battles/wars: King Philip's War

Major Thomas Savage (c. 1607 – February 14, 1682) was an English-born merchant, military officer and politician who thrice served as the speaker of the Massachusetts General Court.

== Early life ==
Thomas Savage was born c. 1607 in Taunton, Somerset. He was reportedly the son of William Savage, a blacksmith whose father was possibly Sir John Savage, 1st Baronet. Confusion exists over Savage's parentage, with the Dictionary of National Biography stating that although "nothing definite can be established about his parentage", colonial administrator Edward Randolph described him as "a gentleman of very good family in England".

On 9 January 1621, he began an apprenticeship at the Worshipful Company of Merchant Taylors, a livery company in the English capital of London. 14 years later in 1635, Savage emigrated from England to the Colony of Massachusetts Bay onboard the merchant ship Planter. Fellow passengers included Henry Vane the Younger, John Winthrop the Younger and Hugh Peter. The Planter eventually arrived in Boston Harbour on October 1635.

After arriving in the colony, he settled down in Boston, becoming a member of the settlement's Puritan church on January 1636 prior to being admitted as a freeman of Massachusetts Bay in May of that year. In 1637, Savage co-founded the Military Company of Massachusetts, a volunteer company of the militia established to train fellow settlers in military tactics; the company was granted a charter by Governor John Winthrop on March 13, 1638.

== Marriage and career ==
By 1637, Savage had married Faith, the daughter of controversial religious reformer Anne Hutchinson, who was then involved in the Antinomian Controversy. Anne, a supporter of Puritan minister John Cotton who clashed with the Boston establishment, was offered "modest support" by Savage; in March 1637, he signed a petition in support of preacher John Wheelwright, and was punished by having his weapons be temporarily confiscated.

Anne was expelled from the Massachusetts Bay Colony in 1637 for continuing to support Cotton. In response, Savage began to consider relocating to the colony of Rhode Island, moving to the region shortly thereafter. On March 7, 1638, Savage signed the Portsmouth Compact, a document drafted by fellow Christian dissidents which established the settlement of Portsmouth. Savage's father-in-law, William Hutchinson, also signed the document.

On March 15, 1638, Anne was called to a church trial following a four-month detention in Roxbury. Savage and Faith returned to Boston and attended the trial, which saw Anne, already expelled from Massachusetts, ejected from her congregation. During the trial, Savage spoke in Anne's favour and refused to admonish her, for which he was admonished as a result. Despite this, Savage eventually decided to permanently move back to Boston.

Once Savage had returned to Boston, he started working as a merchant, leveraging his familial connection's to Faith's family and Boston's burgeoning involvement in Atlantic World trade networks. He was rapidly accepted back into Boston society despite Savage's earlier involved in the Antinomian Controversy. In 1651, he was promoted to the rank of captain; Faith died the next year on February 20, and Savage remarried to Mary, the daughter of Zechariah Symmes, on September 15.

Savage's coat of arms

In 1653, Savage was identified as a suitable military officer to lead a planned expedition against the Dutch colony of New Netherland, which ultimately never materialised. During this period, he also became active in Boston's political sphere, serving on the settlement's select board and the Massachusetts General Court. Savage also served as the speaker of the Massachusetts General Court from 1659 to 1660, then again in 1671, and finally from 1677 to 1678.

== Later life and death ==
In 1660, the Stuart Restoration occurred, with Charles II overthrowing the Commonwealth of England and restoring the English monarchy. Savage, like the majority of Boston's mercantile community, advocated cooperation with the new Restoration regime. The colonial authorities of Massachusetts, who were hostile to the Restoration, summoned Savage along with several other colonists in 1666 to answer for a petition they had signed advocating such a view.

Tensions between New England and local Indians led to the outbreak of King Philip's War in 1675. Savage, now at the rank of major, was appointed the chief command of the militia as a result of Major-General Daniel Denison falling ill. On June 28 he led 300 men on a fruitless expedition to Wampanoag territory before that force was disbanded; in 1676, Savage was once again placed in chief command and took an active role in the rest of the conflict.

During and after the conflict, captive indigenous people were frequently sold by New England colonists into slavery in foreign markets. Savage played a major role in acquiring indigenous captives for the purpose of selling them into slavery, doing so in concert with Massachusetts Bay Colony treasurer John Hull, who was responsible for arranging and recording the sale of all indigenous slaves; Hull recorded the sale of 185 people into slavery during the war.

In 1680, he was appointed as a deputy to the governor of the Massachusetts Bay Colony, Simon Bradstreet. On February 15, 1682, Savage suddenly died at the age of seventy-five in Boston and was buried in the King's Chapel Burying Ground. An elegy, published as a broadside, was written for his funeral in which Puritan priest Samuel Willard gave a sermon; both the elegy and sermon emphasised Savage's military career and "godly care of the Lord's people". Willard's sermon was an example of the declension genre of sermons which were immensely popular in New England.

At the time of his death, Savage owned several properties throughout the Massachusetts Bay Colony. These include a house on Boston's Bennet Street in the city's North End neighbourhood and nearly 2,500 acres of lands in Braintree. His last will and testament, which was dated on June 28, 1675, appointed Hull and New England lawyer Isaac Addington as the executors of the will, which disposed of property worth 3,500 Massachusetts pounds. These included real estate, arms and armour, gold, jewellery, pewter and books.

== Personal life ==
Savage commissioned a portrait of himself by painter Thomas Smith in 1679. In the portrait, which was one of the earliest artistic depictions of Boston Harbour and Beacon Hill, Savage stands attired in the dress of a militia officer with the city's harbour in the background and Savage's coat of arms to his left. American historian Carla Gardina Pestana wrote in the Dictionary of National Biography that the inclusion of Boston Harbour in the portrait serves to symbolise Savage's "mercantile calling". The portrait also included a depiction of a group of militia soldiers in formation.
