= Edward Hutchinson (mercer) =

English mercer (c.1564–1632)

- Born: c. 1564; St Mary le Wigford Parish, Lincolnshire, England
- Died: buried 14 February 1632; Alford, Lincolnshire, England
- Occupation: mercer
- Spouse: Susanna __________
- Children: William, Theophilus, Samuel, Esther, John, Richard, Susanna (died young), Susanna, Anne, Mary, Edward
- Parent(s): John and Ann Hutchinson

Edward Hutchinson (c. 1564 - 1632) was a mercer and a resident of Lincolnshire, England, most noted for the careers of his children in New England. While his father and several of his uncles and brothers became prominent as clergymen, aldermen, sheriffs, and mayors in the city of Lincoln, Edward focused his efforts on his business after moving to the town of Alford. Remarkably, not a single record for him has been found in Alford, other than his burial and the baptisms of his 11 children, but he likely gained a considerable estate, and his children married into prominent families. What was most exceptional about Edward Hutchinson occurred following his 1632 death. Beginning in 1634, five of his nine surviving children and his widow immigrated to New England, and all six of them were exiled from the Massachusetts Bay Colony as a result of the events of the Antinomian Controversy from 1636 to 1638. From Boston two of his children went south and became founding settlers of the Colony of Rhode Island and Providence Plantations, and three of them, with his widow, went north to establish Exeter in the Province of New Hampshire, and then proceeded to Wells, Maine. Because of their involvement in the controversy, his children had a disproportionately large role in the establishment of these new settlements in New England.

== Life ==
Edward Hutchinson was born about 1564 in the parish of St Mary le Wigford in Lincoln in the county of Lincolnshire, England. While the baptismal records for the parish are now lost for that timeframe, Hutchinson's birth year has been determined with a fair amount of accuracy from his apprenticeship records. He was the youngest son, and only son of the second marriage, of John Hutchinson (1515–1565) who had been Sheriff, Alderman, and Mayor of the town of Lincoln, dying in office during his second term as mayor. Edward Hutchinson's mother was Anne, the second wife of his father John, whose maiden name is unknown. Anne had been married earlier, because in her will she mentioned her "son William Clinte," her "son Edward Kirkebie," and her "son Thomas Pinder," though the last two are presumed to be sons-in-law. Anne bore two Hutchinson children, and both her son Edward and the husband of her daughter Mary Freeston were appointed as executors to her will.

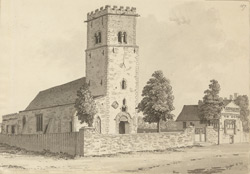
Parish church of St Mary le Wigford in Lincoln where Hutchinson was likely baptised

As a young man, Edward was apprenticed to Edmund Knyght, Alderman and mercer of Lincoln, for a period of eight years. By 1592 Hutchinson had become a mercer in his own right, and was living in Alford, Lincolnshire. Here he left behind almost no records, other than the baptisms of his children. His wife was Susan (or Susanna), as named in the will of his cousin, Margery Neale, who left a legacy to their daughter, Hester. He acquired a good estate, and Chester finds it astonishing that there is neither a will nor administration of his estate to be found in either London or Lincolnshire, noting, "it seems almost impossible, from his business, and the character of the matches made by his children, that he was not a man of considerable position and estate." Edward Hutchinson was buried in Alford on 14 February 1631/2 (and not September 1631 as stated by Whitmore).

Probably the most remarkable aspect of Edward Hutchinson's life is what happened after he died: five of his nine adult children and his widow immigrated to New England, and all six of them were exiled from the Massachusetts Bay Colony as a result of the events of the Antinomian Controversy. During the controversy, the two most prominent antagonists of the established magistrates and clergy of the colony were Anne Hutchinson and John Wheelwright, both of them married to children of Edward. His other three children in New England, and his widow, were involved in the controversy as supporters or family members of supporters. Therefore, when Anne Hutchinson and John Wheelwright were banished from the colony, their family members went with them. Anne Hutchinson, her husband William, and many of their supporters established the first government in what would become the Colony of Rhode Island and Providence Plantations; William's brother, Edward ("Sr.") became a part of this group. John Wheelwright, with many of his supporters, established the settlement of Exeter in the Province of New Hampshire; his wife Mary Hutchinson and her siblings Samuel Hutchinson and Susanna (Hutchinson) Storre were all a part of this group, which also included Edward Hutchinson's elderly widow, Susanna. In this manner, the Hutchinsons, children of Edward Hutchinson, as a family, had a disproportionately large impact on the establishment of two new settlements in New England.

== Family ==
Edward and Susanna Hutchinson had 11 known children whose baptisms were recorded in the Alford parish register. The oldest, William, was baptised 14 August 1586, married Anne Marbury, the daughter of Reverend Francis Marbury, and went to New England. Theophilus was baptised 8 September 1588, and because he is not heard of again, he likely died as a youngster while his parents were travelling, and was buried away from Alford. Samuel was baptised 1 November 1590 and went to New England and Esther (or Hester) was baptised 22 July 1593, and married in 1613 Reverend Thomas Rishworth of Laceby. John was baptised 18 May 1595, being buried in Alford on 20 June 1644 and Richard, baptised 3 January 1597/8 died in London with his will proved 11 April 1670. Susanna was baptised 25 November 1599 and buried in Alford on 5 August 1601; four days later a second Susanna was baptised on 9 August 1601, and she married Augustine Storre and immigrated to New England. The next child, Anne, was baptised 12 June 1603 and may have married a Levitt; Maria or Mary was baptised on 22 December 1605, married John Wheelwright, and immigrated to New England. The youngest child, Edward, was baptised 20 December 1607 and immigrated to New England, though he returned to England.

=== Susanna Hutchinson ===
Edward Hutchinson's wife, Susanna, was born in 1564 by some accounts. Her first child was baptised in 1586. After becoming widowed, she left four grown children behind in England, and in 1636, at the age of around 70 years, arrived in New England with the family of her daughter Mary Wheelwright. The Wheelwrights lived in Boston proper upon their arrival in the colonies, but soon had property in Mount Wollaston, an area south of Boston that became the town of Quincy where Wheelwright preached. Almost immediately upon their arrival, Wheelwright became embroiled in the events of the Antinomian Controversy and was banished from the colony in November 1637. While Wheelwright headed north to New Hampshire that winter, his family, including his mother-in-law Susanna, stayed at Mount Wollaston, waiting for spring before joining him. After living in Exeter for three or four years, Wheelwright was compelled to move again, and established a community at Wells, Maine by 1642, where he and his family lived until early 1647. Susanna died in Wells, and historians Noyes, Libby and Davis offer that she "may be the earliest born emigrant to die in Maine."

=== His children who went to New England ===
Of Edward Hutchinson's nine children who reached maturity, five of them immigrated to New England, though one of the five, Edward, eventually returned to England to live.

==== William Hutchinson ====
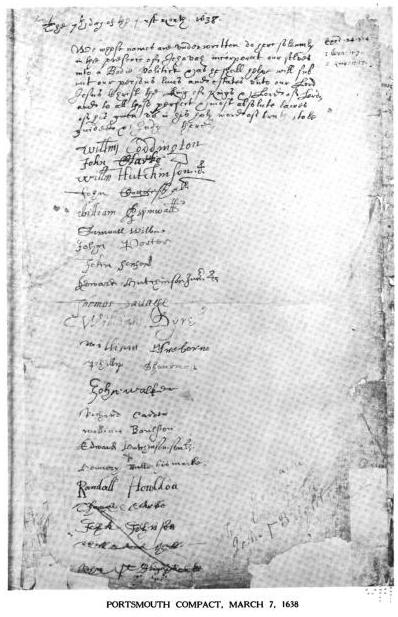
William and his youngest brother Edward both signed the Portsmouth Compact, establishing Rhode Island's first government.

William, baptised 14 August 1586, grew up in Alford and became a merchant in the cloth trade, moving to London as a young man. Here he became close to an old acquaintance from Alford, Anne Marbury, the daughter of Francis Marbury and Bridget Dryden, and the couple was married on 9 August 1612 at the Church of Saint Mary Woolnoth on Lombard Street in London. He and his wife raised a large family in Alford, as he prospered in his business. The couple had 14 children in England, one of whom died in infancy, and two of whom died from the plague. In 1633, the Hutchinsons sent their oldest son, 20-year-old Edward (called Edward, Jr.) to New England with William's youngest brother, Edward (called Edward, Sr.), who was 25 at the time, and his wife. A year later William and his remaining family made the trip to New England aboard the ship Griffin. William became a Boston merchant, became a member of the Boston church in 1634, and took the freeman's oath in 1635. He was also a Deputy to the General Court and a selectman.

Hutchinson's wife was described by historian Thomas W. Bicknell as "a pure and excellent woman, to whose person and conduct there attaches no stain." Governor John Winthrop called her "a woman of ready wit and bold spirit," who had brought with her two dangerous theological errors, elaborating upon them in his journal. She held private meetings at her home, drawing many people from Boston as well as other towns, including many prominent citizens, and treated them to a religious view that was antithetical to the rigid orthodoxy of the Puritan church. As the situation worsened, Mrs. Hutchinson was put on trial in November 1637, convicted, and banished from the colony along with some of her supporters, then detained until the following March, pending a church trial.

On 7 March 1638, before leaving Boston, William Hutchinson and other supporters of his wife signed an instrument, sometimes called the Portsmouth Compact, agreeing to form a non-sectarian government that was Christian in character. The group of signers considered going to New Netherland, but Roger Williams suggested they purchase some land on the Narragansett Bay from the Indians, which they did. They settled on the island of Aquidneck (an island called Rhode Island, whose name was later given to the entire colony and state), and formed the settlement of Pocasset, renamed Portsmouth in 1639. Hutchinson became the judge (governor) of the Portsmouth settlement from 1639 until 12 March 1640, when Portsmouth united with Newport to become the Colony of Rhode Island, with William Coddington elected as governor of the two-town colony, and Hutchinson becoming one of his assistants.

William Hutchinson died in Portsmouth shortly after June 1641, after which his widow left Rhode Island to live in the part of New Netherland that later became Bronx in New York City. Here, as the result of tensions between the Dutch and the Indians, she, six of her children, a son-in-law, and as many as seven others (likely servants) were massacred by Indians in late summer 1643.

==== Samuel Hutchinson ====
Samuel, baptised in Alford on 1 November 1590, had religious leanings, was educated, and like his younger brother Edward, published theological treatises that displayed a command of Latin. Perhaps because of his religious desires, he departed England in the late spring of 1637, arriving in Boston on 12 July with a group of others from Lincolnshire. The Antinomian Controversy was about at its peak when he arrived, and as a result a law had been passed requiring new immigrants to disavow the doctrine of the free-grace advocates (Anne Hutchinson, John Wheelwright, and their allies). This they would not do, and were therefore limited to four months in the colony. When the court met again in November, Samuel was allowed to remain in the colony until after the winter.

Samuel went to Exeter in the spring of 1638, and was a grantee in one of the Indian deeds in April of that year. In September 1641, after Wheelwright was forced to leave Exeter, Samuel Hutchinson and Nicholas Needham and some others negotiated with Thomas Gorges for land at Wells, Maine where most of the settlers soon proceeded. Samuel received a grant of land in Rhode Island where his brother William had gone, but if he went there, did not stay long. In 1644 he was bequeathed a small legacy by the will of his brother John, who remained in England.

At some point Samuel returned to Boston, and in 1667 published a small treatise defending the concept of the Millennium (the creation of a "glorious church" before the Second Coming of Christ), but it gives no hint of his attitude toward the theology of his in-laws Anne Hutchinson and John Wheelwright. On 7 April 1667 he wrote his will, calling himself of Boston. He mentioned no wife or children, but made bequests to a large number of relatives, including "couzen" Susanna Cole (actually his niece) and "couzen" Peleg Sanford (actually his grand-nephew), to whom he left an orchard in Portsmouth, Rhode Island. Witnesses to his will signed a deposition on 16 July 1667, suggesting that he had died by that date.

==== Susanna Hutchinson ====
Baptised in Alford on 9 August 1601, Susanna was married there on 21 November 1623 to Augustine Storre. Her husband was the son of Thomas Storre, the vicar of Bilsby, Lincolnshire, after whose death John Wheelwright became the vicar. Wheelwright's first wife, Mary, was the sister of Augustine, and when she died, Wheelwright then married Susanna's younger sister, Mary Hutchinson. The Storres likely arrived in Boston in July 1637, on the same ship with Susanna's brother Samuel Hutchinson. They were still in Boston in 1638 when on 3 April Augustine was named in a deed of land from an Indian sagamore to a group of settlers preparing to establish Exeter in the Province of New Hampshire. By 1639 Storre was in Exeter, and his name appears second on the list of signatories, after Wheelwright's, of the combination, dated 4 July 1639, forming the government there. On 18 January 1640 Storre was selected as an assistant "Ruler" of the new settlement, a position similar to that of selectman. When Wheelwright was forced to leave Exeter, the Storres went with him to Wells, Maine, but there are no records of Augustine there, suggesting that he soon died.

In 1644, Susanna was named in the will of John Hutchinson, one of her brothers still living in England, being called "sister Stor." The following year Susanna was back in Boston as the wife of another Lincolnshire emigrant, Atherton Hough ("Huff"). On 4 April 1646, Mrs. Susanna Hough "upon letters of dismission from the church at Wells," was admitted to the Boston church. Her second husband died just a few years later, on 11 September 1650, and she was dead the following May when the inventory of her estate was taken. She had no known children, but a "list of debts & legacies" from her estate includes the names of several relatives, including her "sister Whelwright" and "her brother Sam Hutchinson."

==== Mary Hutchinson ====
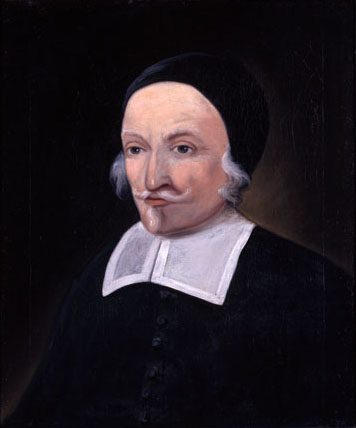
Three of Hutchinson's children, and his widow, went with John Wheelwright to Exeter and then Wells.

Mary, baptised 22 December 1605 married John Wheelwright sometime about 1630 when she was 24 years old. Wheelwright's first wife, Mary Storre, died in 1629, leaving him with three small children. Following his marriage to Mary, the couple had three children baptised in England (one died young) and five more in New England. Wheelwright had been the vicar of the parish church in Bilsby, Lincolnshire for ten years when in 1633 he was released from the position, apparently for simony when he tried to sell his position back to the patron. He may have been trying to gather funds for a trip to New England, but instead was forced to find other employment until he was finally able to emigrate in 1636. Mary's mother, the widowed Susanna Hutchinson, likely sailed to New England with the Wheelwrights, because she lived with this family for the remainder of her life.

Once in New England, Wheelwright quickly became embroiled in the events of the Antinomian Controversy that was shaking the foundation of the young Massachusetts colony. When he was banished, and spent the winter of 1637–1638 in southern New Hampshire, Mary, her children, and her mother stayed at their farm in Mount Wollaston, about ten miles south of Boston. They then joined him in the foundling settlement of Exeter, where they stayed for a few years. They were then compelled to move once again, by early 1642, this time to Wells, Maine, and this is where Mary's mother died. In early 1647 Wheelwright was given a pastoring position at the church in Hampton (then a part of the Bay Colony), where the family moved next. They were together here as a family for almost ten years, but by 1655 they were back in Mary's home town in England where on 12 December a salary augmentation of £60 was to be granted "to John Wheelwright, minister of Alford, co. Lincoln, who has a great charge of children, beside[s] the £40 already allowed." Upon their return from England in 1662 the family moved to Salisbury, Massachusetts where Wheelwright died in 1679. All that is known about Mary is that she predeceased him.

==== Edward Hutchinson, Sr. ====
Edward was baptised in Alford on 20 December 1607, was educated, and like his brother Samuel, published religious treatises that showed his fluency with Latin. Though his father was Edward, he is called Edward, Sr. in New England to distinguish him from his nephew, called Edward Jr. In the summer of 1633, at the age of 25, he sailed to New England aboard the ship Griffin, accompanied by this nephew, Edward, the oldest son of his oldest brother, William. On the same ship was the future minister of the Boston church, John Cotton.

Memorial plaque at Founder's Brook Park, Portsmouth, Rhode Island, commemorating those who signed the Portsmouth Compact, including "Edward Hutchinson Sen'r"

Edward was admitted to the Boston church in October 1633, and was made a freeman the following March. In November 1634 he was on a committee to assess various rates for Boston, and he carried the title of Sergeant by 1637. As a young adult, Edward became caught up in the events of the Antinomian Controversy from 1636 to 1638, in which his sister-in-law, Anne Hutchinson, and his brother-in-law, John Wheelwright, were centrally involved. On 2 November 1637, following Anne's sentence of banishment, and while she was awaiting her church trial, Edward was "convented for having his hand to the seditious libel, justifying the same, & using contemptuous speeches, the Court did disfranchise him, fine him in £40, put him from office, & commit him during the pleasure of the Court." On 20 November he was on a list of those who were disarmed as a result of the controversy, and the following March he and William Baulston were given license to depart out of the jurisdiction. During this time he was among a group of 23 men who signed a compact, dated 7 March 1638, establishing a new government. He signed the compact as "Edward Hutchinson, Sr." because his nephew Edward, the son of William and Anne Hutchinson, also signed the document, as "Edward Hutchinson, Jr." The signatories were not sure where to go, but were convinced by Roger Williams to buy land of the natives and settle near the Narragansett Bay. This is what most of the signers of the compact did, establishing the settlement of Pocasset on Aquidneck Island, soon to become Portsmouth in the Colony of Rhode Island and Providence Plantations.

Edward was a baker, and in November 1638 he was ordered to bake bread "for the use of the plantation" in Portsmouth. He was also one of three men appointed to administer the venison trade with the natives. His stay in Rhode Island was short, and he had returned to England sometime before 1644 when he was a witness to the will of his brother John. Once back in England he became a member of the "Ironmonger's Company," and was in business in London.

Edward's wife was named Sarah, and since she was admitted to the Boston church in December 1633, she almost certainly sailed to New England with him. The couple had two children baptised in Boston, John and Ichabod, but there is no further record of either of them. Edward and his wife were both still alive in 1669 when mentioned in the will of his brother Richard. Online accounts that give his death date as 1675 are confusing him with his nephew Edward, who died that year from wounds received during King Philips War.

=== His children who remained in England ===
Of Edward Hutchinson's nine grown children, four of them remained in England, but two of the four had ties with New England, and a third one may have as well. His daughter Esther married Reverend Thomas Rishworth, and though they remained in England, their son Edward went to New England with his Hutchinson and Wheelwright kin, and followed his Uncle John Wheelwright from Boston to Exeter where he signed the Exeter compact in 1639. Young Rishworth followed Wheelwright to Wells and then Hampton, before moving to York, Maine where he became the recorder for the Maine province, a position he held for nearly 35 years.

Edward Hutchinson's son Richard also remained in England, but four of his sons emigrated, and it is through them that Richard had numerous business ties with the colonies. The sons who came to New England were Edward, Eliakim, Samuel, and William, and they all had land and business interests in Maine. Richard was an "opulent ironmonger in London" who was a partner in Beex and Company, represented in New England by his sons. Richard wrote his will on 4 November 1669, in which he left sizeable bequests to his many children, and also left ten pounds to his "brother Edward Hutchinson and his wife."

Hutchinson's daughter Anne may have had ties to New England, but this is not known definitively. She may have been the "sister Levitt" mentioned in the will of her brother John Hutchinson in 1644. A theory has been presented that her husband was Thomas Leavitt who was baptised at Melton in County York on 8 July 1594, the nephew of Reverend Ralph Leavitt of Grainsby, Lincolnshire, but none of this has been substantiated. If true, however, then Thomas and Anne Leavitt are likely the parents of Thomas Leavitt who signed the compact in Exeter, New Hampshire in 1639, then moved to Hampton.

Only Hutchinson's son John had no established or suspected relationship with New England. John was a woollen draper in Alford, and likely did not marry Elizabeth Woodthorpe, as stated in several accounts. He is certainly the John Hutchinson who married on 5 October 1626 Bridget, the daughter of William Bury. He died before his 50th birthday, leaving a detailed will, and his wife lived as his widow for nearly 45 years thereafter. The couple had ten children, all baptised at Alford.

== See also ==
- Puritanism
- Antinomian Controversy
- History of New England
- History of Massachusetts
- History of New Hampshire
- History of Maine
- History of Rhode Island
