= William Hutchinson (Rhode Island judge) =

New Hampshire judge (1586–1641)

2nd Judge (governor) of the Town of Portsmouth
- In office 1639–1640
- Preceded by: William Coddington
- Succeeded by: William Coddington as Governor of Newport and Portsmouth

Personal details
- Born: baptised August 14, 1586 Alford, Lincolnshire, England
- Died: 1641 Portsmouth, Colony of Rhode Island and Providence Plantations)
- Spouse: Anne Hutchinson
- Children: Edward, Susanna, Richard, Faith, Bridget, Francis, Elizabeth, William, Samuel, Anne, Mary, Katherine, William, Susanna, Zuriel
- Occupation: Merchant, deputy, magistrate, selectman, treasurer, judge (governor)

William Hutchinson (1586–1641) was a judge at Portsmouth in the Colony of Rhode Island and Providence Plantations. He sailed from England to New England in 1634 with his large family. He became a merchant in Boston and served as both Deputy to the General Court and selectman. His wife was Anne Hutchinson who became embroiled in a theological controversy with the Puritan leaders of the Massachusetts Bay Colony which resulted in her banishment in 1638. The Hutchinsons and 18 others departed to form the new settlement of Pocasset on the Narragansett Bay, which was renamed Portsmouth and became one of the original towns in the Rhode Island colony.

Hutchinson became treasurer in Portsmouth, and William Coddington was the judge (or governor). A controversy compelled Coddington to relocate in 1639 and establish the town of Newport, at which time Hutchinson became the chief magistrate of Portsmouth. This lasted for less than a year, however, as he died shortly after June 1641, and his widow and many of her younger children moved to New Netherland (later in the Bronx in New York City). Mrs. Hutchinson and all but one of her children perished shortly after, massacred by Indians.

William Hutchinson was described by Governor John Winthrop as being mild-tempered, somewhat weak, and living within the shadow of his prominent and outspoken wife.

== Early life ==
Coat of arms of William Hutchinson

William Hutchinson was born into a prominent Lincolnshire family. He was the grandson of John Hutchinson (1515–1565) who had been Sheriff, Alderman, and Mayor of the town of Lincoln, dying in office during his second term as mayor. John's youngest son Edward (1564–1632) moved to Alford and had 11 children with his wife Susanna, the oldest of whom was William, who was baptized August 14, 1586 in Alford.

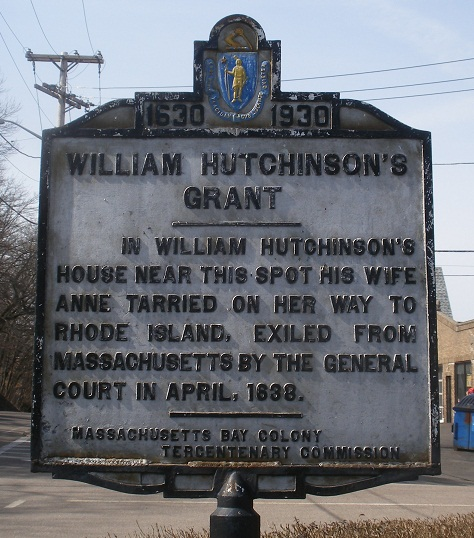
Historical highway marker for William and Anne Hutchinson property at Mount Wollaston, later in Quincy, Massachusetts

William Hutchinson grew up in Alford where he was the warden of his church in 1620 and 1621. He then became a merchant in the cloth trade and moved to London. Here he renewed a friendship from Alford with Anne Marbury, the daughter of Francis Marbury and Bridget Dryden, and the couple were married on August 9, 1612 at the Church of Saint Mary Woolnoth on Lombard Street in London. Anne's father was a clergyman, school master, and Puritan reformer who was educated at Cambridge.

Hutchinson and his wife raised a large family in Alford, as he prospered in his business. The couple had 14 children in England, one of whom died in infancy, and two of whom died from the plague. The Hutchinsons, particularly Anne, became very enamored with the preaching of the Reverend John Cotton who was the vicar of Saint Botolph's Church in the town of Boston, about 21 miles from Alford, and they made the day-long round trip to Boston whenever they could to hear Cotton preach.

Cotton had strong Puritan sympathies, however, and Archbishop William Laud began cracking down on those whose opinions differed from the established Anglican church. Cotton was forced into hiding, and then had to flee the country to avoid imprisonment. Mrs. Hutchinson was distraught to lose her mentor, and the family intended to sail with him to New England aboard the ship Griffin in 1633; however, Anne's 14th pregnancy prevented it. Instead, they sent their oldest son Edward, age 20 and under the care of Cotton, with the intention of following to New England as soon as they could. William Hutchinson's youngest brother, also named Edward, was aboard the same ship with his wife.

In 1634, William Hutchinson, his wife Anne, and his other ten children sailed from England to New England on the Griffin, the same ship that had taken Cotton and their oldest son a year earlier. The family first resided at Boston where Hutchinson was admitted to the Boston Church on October 26, 1634, and his wife was admitted seven days later. He became a merchant in Boston and took the freeman's oath there in 1635. He was one of the town's deputies to the Massachusetts Bay General Court from 1635 to 1636, and was also a selectman from 1635 to 1637, attending a selectmen's meeting for the last time in January 1638 as his tenure in Boston was coming to an end.

== Trouble in Boston ==
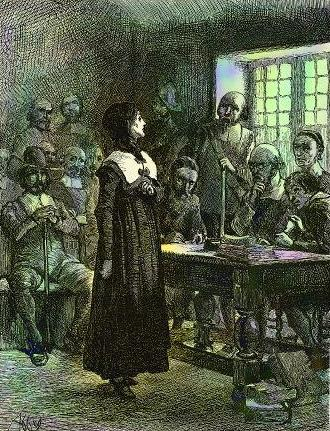
"Anne Hutchinson on Trial" by Edwin Austin Abbey

Hutchinson's wife was described by historian Thomas W. Bicknell, writing 300 years after she lived, as "a pure and excellent woman, to whose person and conduct there attaches no stain." Her own contemporaries, however, did not view her in the same light. She was helpful to the sick and needy, and she was undeniably gifted in argument and speech, but her theological doctrines and open disdain toward Boston's ministers began to inflame a growing controversy between Cotton's followers and the Puritan elders. In late 1636, Governor John Winthrop wrote that Mrs. Hutchinson was "a woman of ready wit and bold spirit," but she had brought several dangerous theological errors which he elaborated on in his journal. She was holding private meetings at her home, drawing many people from Boston and other towns, including many prominent citizens, and teaching them a religious view that was increasingly antithetical to the views of the Puritan church. She also began to express an open disdain for most of the Puritan ministers, with the exception of Cotton. She was finally put on trial in November 1637, convicted, and banished from the colony along with some of her followers.

== Settling in Rhode Island ==
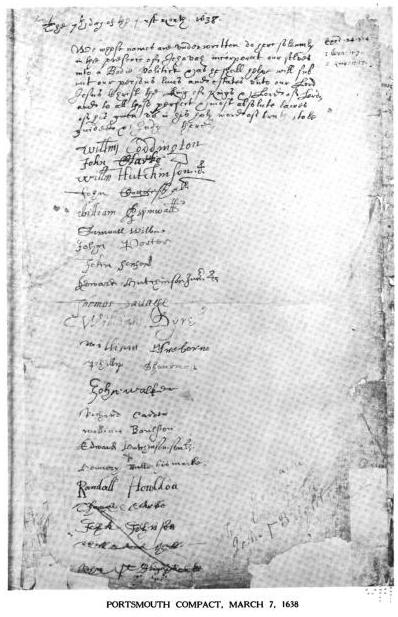
Portsmouth Compact with William Hutchinson's signature third on the list

William Hutchinson and other supporters of his wife signed the Portsmouth Compact on March 7, 1638 before leaving Boston, agreeing to form a non-sectarian government that was Christian in character. The group of signers considered going to New Netherland, but Roger Williams suggested that they purchase some land on the Narragansett Bay from the Narragansett Indians. They purchased Aquidneck Island, which was called Rhode Island at the time, and formed the settlement of Pocasset there, which was renamed Portsmouth in 1639. In June 1638, Hutchinson was the treasurer of the town and William Coddington was called judge, the name given to the chief magistrate of the settlement.

The following year, a disagreement prompted Coddington and a few other leaders to leave Portsmouth and begin a new settlement at the south end of the island called Newport. Hutchinson became the judge (governor) of the Portsmouth settlement from 1639 until March 12, 1640, when Portsmouth united with Newport, with Coddington elected as governor and Hutchinson becoming one of his assistants. In his journal, Governor Winthrop described the 1639 disagreement in Portsmouth: "the people grew very tumultuous and put out Mr. Coddington and the other three magistrates, and chose Mr. William Hutchinson only, a man of very mild temper and weak parts, and wholly guided by his wife, who had been the beginner of all the former troubles in the country and still continued to breed disturbance."

Hutchinson died in Portsmouth shortly after June 1641, after which his widow left Rhode Island to live in New Netherland on the border between the Bronx and Westchester County, New York. Soon after the move, she and her entire household were murdered by Indians in a massacre during a war with the Dutch in late summer 1643, with only one daughter escaping.

== Family and descendants ==
William and Anne Hutchinson had 15 children, all but the last born in England. The oldest child was Edward, a captain who died from wounds received at the battle of Wheeler's Surprise during King Philip's War. The fourth child was Faith, who married Thomas Savage, a Boston soldier and merchant. The fifth child was Bridget; she married John Sanford who succeeded William Coddington as Governor of the two towns on Rhode Island (Portsmouth and Newport) following the repeal of the Coddington Commission. Their 14th child was Susanna, the only survivor of the Indian massacre which killed her mother and six of her siblings. She was taken captive by those Indians and held by them for several years.

Hutchinson's sister Mary was the wife of the Reverend John Wheelwright, another banished minister who founded Exeter, New Hampshire. Prominent descendants of William and Anne Hutchinson include U.S. Presidents Franklin D. Roosevelt, George H. W. Bush, and George W. Bush.

== See also ==
- Susanna Cole for his ancestry chart
- List of colonial governors of Rhode Island
- List of early settlers of Rhode Island
- Colony of Rhode Island and Providence Plantations
