= John Wheelwright =

English-born clergyman (1592–1679)

The Reverend John Wheelwright
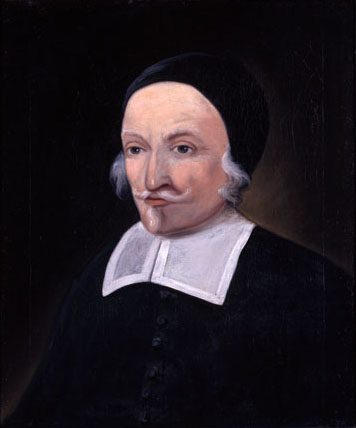
- c. 1677 portrait of Wheelwright
- Born: c. 1592; Saleby, Lincolnshire, England
- Died: 15 November 1679; Salisbury, Massachusetts
- Resting place: Colonial Burying Ground, Salisbury
- Education: Sidney Sussex College, Cambridge, B.A. 1614/5; M.A. 1618
- Occupation: Clergyman
- Spouse(s): (1) Mary Storre (2) Mary Hutchinson
- Children: (1st wife): John, Thomas, William, Susannah; (2nd wife): Katherine, Mary, Elizabeth, Mary, Samuel, Rebecca, Hannah, Sarah
- Parent: Robert Wheelwright

John Wheelwright (c. 1592 – 15 November 1679) was an English Puritan clergyman known for being banished from the Massachusetts Bay Colony during the Antinomian Controversy, and for subsequently establishing the town of Exeter, New Hampshire. Born in Lincolnshire, England, he graduated from Sidney Sussex College, Cambridge. Ordained in 1619, he became the vicar of Bilsby, Lincolnshire, until he was removed for simony.

Leaving for New England in 1636, he was welcomed in Boston, where his brother-in-law's wife, Anne Hutchinson, was beginning to attract negative attention for her religious outspokenness. Soon he and Hutchinson accused the majority of the colony's ministers and magistrates of espousing a "covenant of works". As this controversy reached a peak, Hutchinson and Wheelwright were banished from the colony. Wheelwright went north with a group of followers during the harsh winter of 1637–1638, and in April 1638 established the town of Exeter in what would become the Province of New Hampshire. Wheelwright's stay in Exeter lasted only a few years, because Massachusetts activated an earlier claim on the lands there, forcing the banished Wheelwright to leave. He went further east, to Wells, Maine, where he was living when his order of banishment was retracted. He returned to Massachusetts to preach at Hampton (later part of the Province of New Hampshire), where in 1654 his parishioners helped him get the complete vindication that he sought from the Massachusetts Court for the events of 17 years earlier.

In 1655 Wheelwright moved back to England with his family, and preached near his home in Lincolnshire. While in England he was entertained by two of his powerful friends, Oliver Cromwell, who had become Lord Protector, and Sir Henry Vane, who occupied key positions in the government. Following Cromwell's death, the Restoration of the Monarchy in 1660 and Vane's execution, Wheelwright returned to New England to become the minister in Salisbury, Massachusetts, where he spent the remainder of his life. He was characterized as being contentious and unbending, but also forgiving, energetic and courageous. His sincere piety was never called into question, even by those whose opinions differed greatly from his.

== Early life ==
John Wheelwright, born about 1592, was the son of Robert Wheelwright of Cumberworth and Saleby in Lincolnshire, England. When his father died in 1612, Wheelwright administered the estate, and was also the heir to some property in Lincolnshire. His grandfather, also named John Wheelwright, died in 1611 at Mumby.

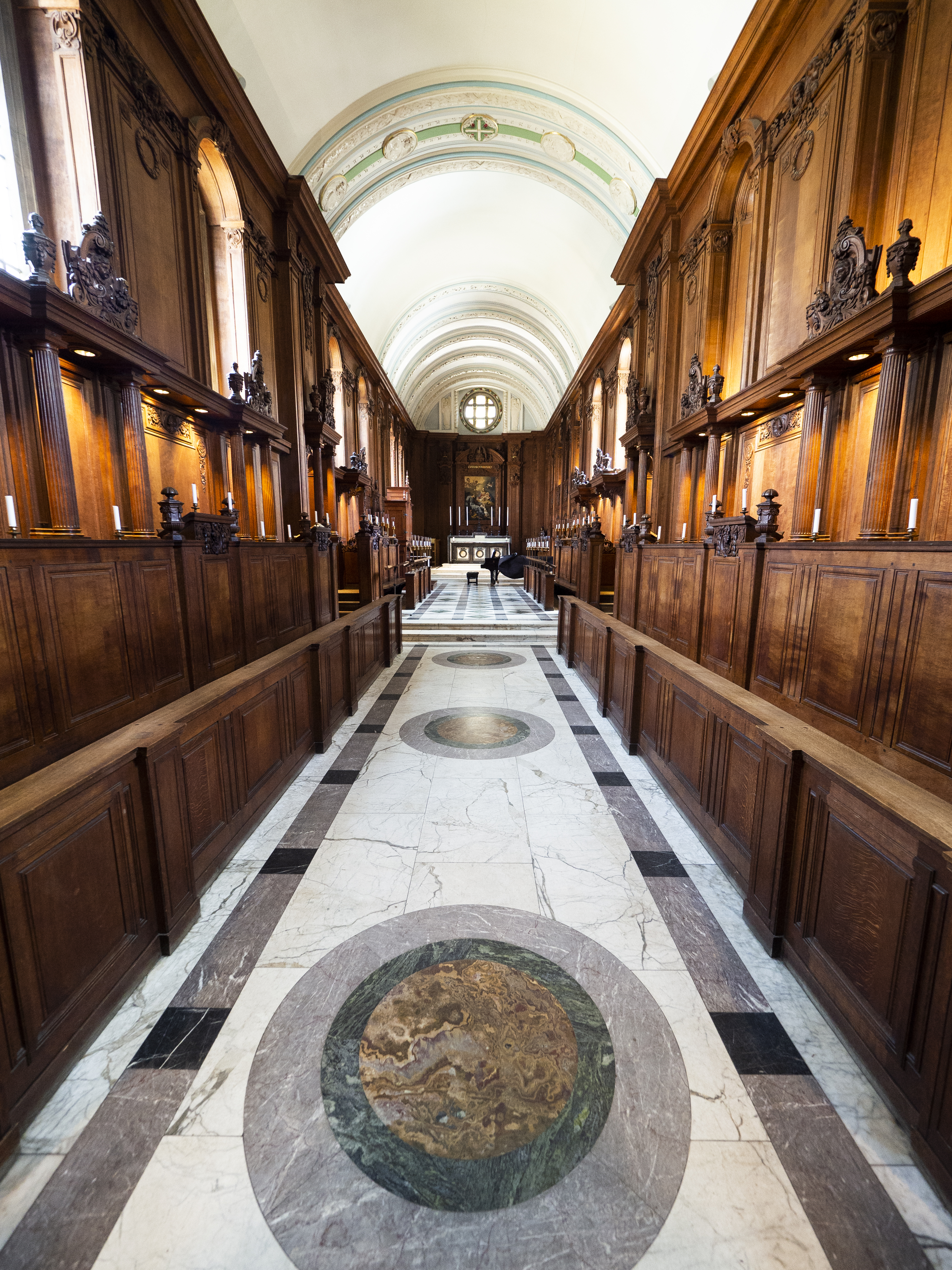
At Sidney Sussex, Wheelwright studied alongside Oliver Cromwell whose head is buried near the college chapel

In 1611, Wheelwright entered Sidney Sussex College, Cambridge which shared its Puritan ethos with the other newly established Cambridge college: Emmanuel. Entering as a sizar, Wheelwright received his B.A. in 1614/5 and his M.A. in 1618. At Cambridge, Wheelwright had noteworthy athletic abilities, and the American Puritan, Cotton Mather (born 1663), wrote, "when Wheelwright was a young spark at the University he was noted for more than an ordinary stroke at wrestling". At Sidney Sussex, Wheelwright first met his life-long friend Oliver Cromwell and fellow Lincolnshire man Rev. William Skepper (1597-c.1650) who, like Wheelwright, would leave England (1638) to 'find freedom' at the Massachusetts Bay Colony. Both Wheelwright and Skepper shared a friend in fellow Puritan and Cambridge contemporary John Cotton.

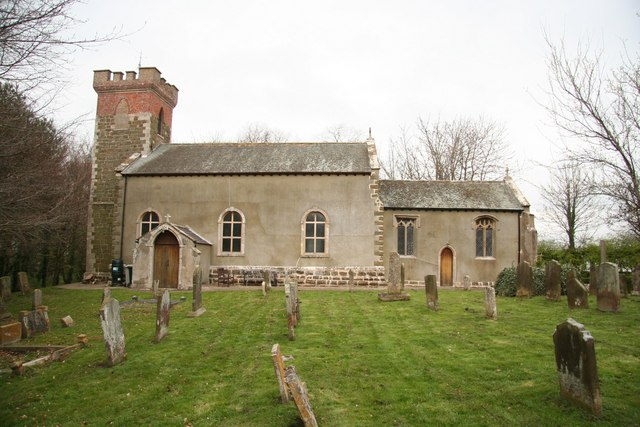
Holy Trinity Church, Bilsby, where Wheelwright was vicar

Wheelwright was ordained a deacon on 19 December 1619, and the following day was ordained a priest in the Church of England. On 8 November 1621 he married Mary Storre, the daughter of Thomas Storre, who was the vicar of Bilsby. In April 1623, following the death of his father-in-law, Wheelwright was instituted as the vicar of Bilsby. His first wife died in 1629, and was buried in Bilsby on 18 May. He soon thereafter married Mary Hutchinson, a daughter of Edward Hutchinson of Alford, and a sister of William Hutchinson, whose wife was Anne Hutchinson.

After nearly ten years as vicar, Wheelwright was suspended in 1633 following his attempt to sell his Bilsby ministry back to its patron to get funds to travel to New England. He was convicted of simony (selling church offices), and removed from office. After his removal from Bilsby he was likely in Laceby in June 1633 where his daughter Elizabeth was baptized. He then preached at Belleau, Lincolnshire, but was soon silenced by the Church authorities for his Puritan opinions. Wheelwright left England in 1636 with his second wife, her mother Susanna Hutchinson, and his five living children.

== Massachusetts ==
Wheelwright arrived in Boston in the Massachusetts Bay Colony on 26 May 1636, and was admitted to the First Church in Boston on 12 June 1636, with his wife, Mary, and her mother, Susanna Hutchinson. During the year of his arrival, several of the Puritan ministers of Massachusetts had taken notice of the religious gatherings that his relative by marriage, Anne Hutchinson, had been holding at her house, and they also began having questions about the preaching of John Cotton whose Boston parishioners seemed to them to be harboring some theologically unsound opinions. Wheelwright was a strong advocate of Cotton's theology, as was Hutchinson, but their views differed from those of the majority of the colony's ministers, and they soon became embroiled in a major clash over this issue.

=== Theological views ===
After his arrival in New England, Wheelwright preached primarily to the Boston settlers who owned land at Mount Wollaston (modern-day Quincy), still considered a part of Boston at the time, but located about ten miles south of the Boston meetinghouse. Within months, someone had alerted magistrate John Winthrop, a lay person in the Boston church, that Wheelwright was harboring familist and antinomian doctrines. Familism, the theology of the Family of Love, involved one's perfect union with God under the Holy Spirit, coupled with freedom from both sin, and the responsibility for it. Antinomianism, or being freed from moral law under the covenant of grace, was a form of familism. Most of the New England Puritan ministers were adamantly opposed to these theological doctrines, seeing them as the cause of the violent and bloody ravages of the anabaptists in Germany during the Münster Rebellion of the 1530s. When confronted with accusations of familism, Wheelwright denied preaching such a doctrine. While Winthrop and many of the colony's ministers may have viewed Wheelwright as a familist, Cotton saw him as an orthodox minister.

=== Antinomian Controversy ===
As early as spring 1636 the minister of Newtown (later renamed Cambridge), Thomas Shepard, began a correspondence with Boston minister John Cotton, and in his letters Shepard notified Cotton of his concern about Cotton's theology, and of some strange opinions circulating among the members of the Boston church. Cotton, who advocated that God's free grace was the only path to salvation, differed from all of the colony's other ministers, who felt that sanctification (works) was a necessary ingredient to salvation. When Wheelwright arrived in the colony, he became a firm ally of Cotton in these theological differences. Opinions that were first shared in private correspondence soon began to find their way into Shepard's sermons to his Newtown congregation. This "pulpit aggression" did not go unnoticed by Wheelwright, and soon his own sermons began taking a critical view of the "covenant of works" being preached by Shepard.

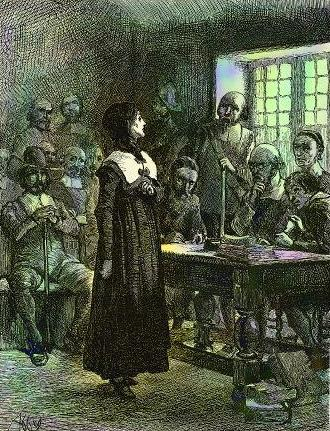
Anne Hutchinson, related to Wheelwright by marriage, was one of the first to be blamed for the colony's difficulties during the Antinomian Controversy.

Theological tension was mounting in the colony, but it wasn't until October 1636 when it became noticeable enough for Winthrop to record an entry in his journal. On or shortly after 21 October 1636 he noted the rising disunity, but instead of pointing fingers at one of the godly ministers, he instead put the blame on Wheelwright's sister-in-law, writing, "One Mrs. Hutchinson, a member of the church at Boston, a woman of a ready wit and a bold spirit, brought over with her two dangerous errors: 1. That the person of the Holy Ghost dwells in a justified person. 2. That no sanctification can help to evidence to us our justification".

Late in October the colony's ministers confronted the question of religious opinions directly and had a "conference in private" with Cotton, Hutchinson, and Wheelwright. The outcome of this meeting was favorable, and the parties were in agreement. Cotton, whose theology rested on a covenant of grace, gave satisfaction to the other ministers that sanctification (a covenant of works) did help in finding grace in the eyes of God, and Wheelwright agreed as well. However, the effects of the conference were short-lived, because a majority of the members of the Boston church, Cotton's parishioners, held the free grace ideas strongly, and they wanted Wheelwright to become the church's second pastor behind Cotton. The church already had another pastor, Reverend John Wilson, who was unsympathetic to the free grace advocates. Wilson was a friend of Winthrop, who was a layman in the church, and it was Winthrop who took advantage of a rule requiring unanimity in a church vote to thwart Wheelwright's appointment. Though Winthrop "thought reverendly" of Wheelwright's talents and piety, he felt that he was "apt to raise doubtful disputations [and] he could not consent to choose him to that place". This was Winthrop's way of suggesting that Wheelwright maintained familist doctrines.

In December 1636 the ministers met once again, but this meeting did not produce agreement, and Cotton warned about the question of sanctification becoming essentially a covenant of works. When questioned directly, Hutchinson accused the other ministers of preaching works and not grace, but did this only in private. These theological differences had begun to take their toll in the political aspects of the colony, and Massachusetts' governor, Henry Vane the Younger, a strong advocate of free grace, announced his resignation to a special session of the deputies. While citing urgent matters back in England as being his reason for stepping down, when prodded, he broke down, blurting out his concern that God's judgment would "come upon us for these differences and dissensions". The members of the Boston church successfully induced Vane to withdraw his resignation, while the General Court began to debate who was responsible for the colony's troubles. The General Court, like the remainder of the colony, was deeply divided, and called for a general fast to take place on 19 January in hopes that such repentance would restore peace.

==== Fast-day sermon ====
During the appointed day of fasting on 19 January 1637, John Cotton preached in the morning, focusing his sermon on the need for pacification and reconciliation. Wheelwright then spoke in the afternoon, and while in the eyes of a lay person his sermon may have appeared benign and non-threatening, to the Puritan clergy it was "censurable and incited mischief". Historian Michael Winship more pointedly called it a "bitterly uncharitable sermon" and the "most notorious Boston contribution to the escalation of pulpit rhetoric". There was no immediate reaction to the sermon, other than Winthrop noting in his journal that "the ministers were now disputing the doctrinal issues in their pulpits". He also noted that Cotton alone was of one party against the other ministers, not even thinking of Wheelwright as being a player in the developing controversy.

As word of Wheelwright's sermon circulated, however, Winthrop was made more aware of its incendiary character, and he then wrote that Wheelwright "inveighed against all that walked in a covenant of works," and concerning those who preached works, he "called them antichrists, and stirred up the people against them with much bitterness and vehemency". The free grace advocates, on the other hand, were encouraged by the sermon, and intensified their crusade against the "legalists" among the clergy. During church services and lectures they publicly asked the ministers about their doctrines which disagreed with their own beliefs, and Vane in particular became active in challenging the doctrines of the colony's divines.

==== March trial ====
During the next two months the other ministers made several doctrinal charges against Wheelwright, noting not only his fast-day sermon, but also his sermons at Mount Wollaston. When the General Court next met on 9 March, Wheelwright was called upon to answer for his fast-day sermon. There were 12 magistrates and 33 deputies sitting on the court at the time, and of the magistrates, Vane, William Coddington and Richard Dummer were strong Wheelwright partisans. Four of the other magistrates, John Humphrey, Simon Bradstreet, Richard Bellingham, and John Winthrop, Jr. were all known for their tolerance of religious diversity compared with their fellow magistrates. It was the deputies who led the case against Wheelwright, and the charge they brought against him was "preaching on the Fast Day a Heretical and Seditious sermon, tending to mutiny and disturbance".

After more charges and countercharges, Wheelwright presented a transcript of his fast-day sermon to the court, and was then dismissed for the day. Following his departure, his supporters presented the court with a petition signed by more than forty people challenging the court's right to try a case of conscience before it was heard by the church. The petition was rejected.

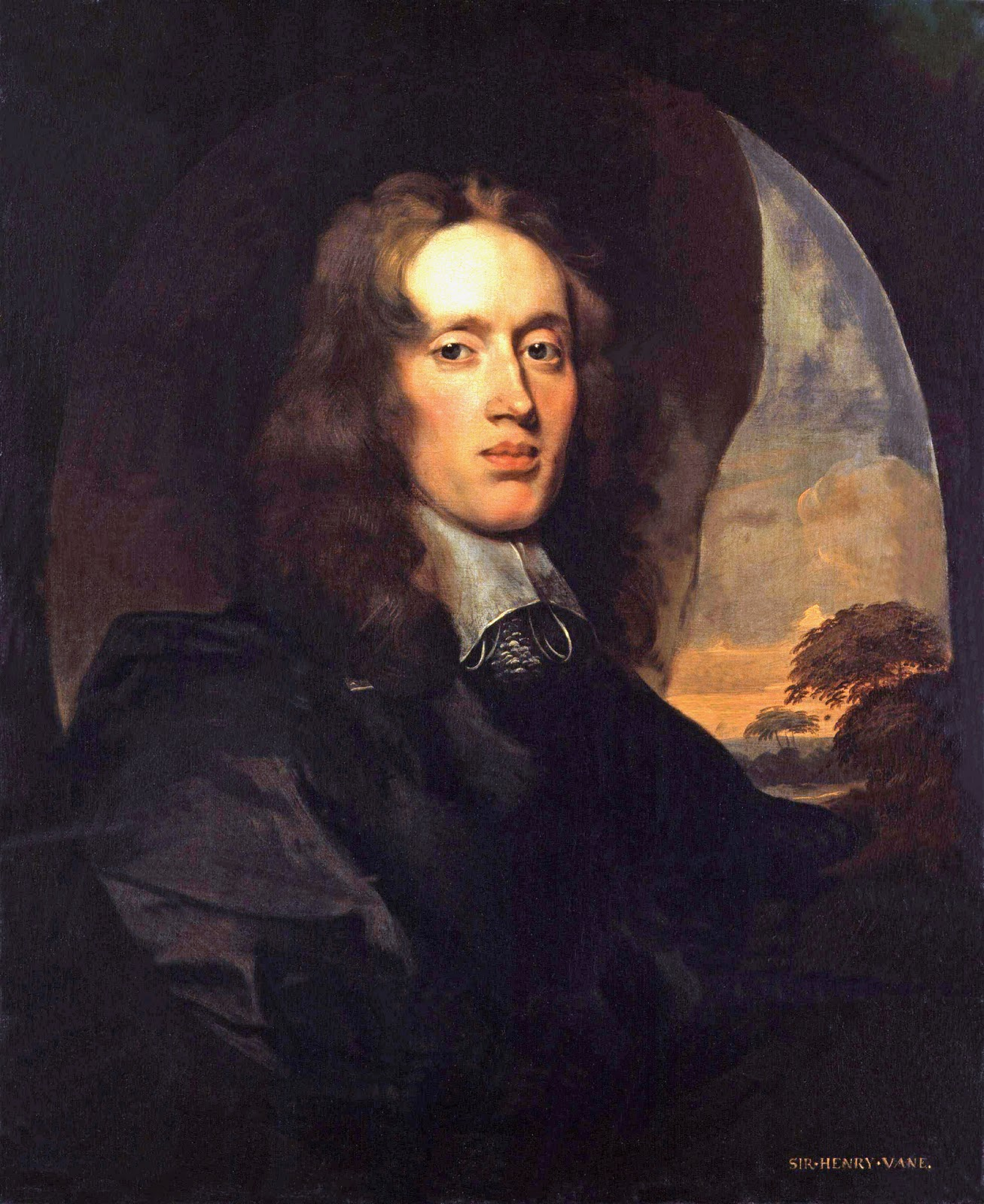
Governor Henry Vane strongly supported Wheelwright during the colony's difficulties from 1636 to 1637.

The next morning Wheelwright was given a private session with the court at which time he asked who his accusers were. The court's answer was that his sermon was the accuser. That afternoon, the court was opened to the general public, and the colony's ministers were also present. One of the lines of attack used against Wheelwright was identifying his doctrine, and that of Cotton, as being "False Doctrine" because of its difference from that of all of the other New England ministers. Cotton's angry response to this was, "Brother Wheelwright's Doctrine was according to God," letting the court know that by going after Wheelwright they were going after him as well, and this essentially ended that line of attack. After some additional ineffective prosecutorial attempts, the court hit on the idea of asking the colony's ministers if they felt they were attacked by Wheelwright's sermon. Following an evening to discuss this among themselves, the ministers returned to the court the next day. With Cotton dissenting, the other ministers said that they did "walk in" and teach what Wheelwright called a covenant of works, and therefore they were the Antichrists alluded to in the sermon.

To their credit, the ministers presented Wheelwright with a means to gracefully back down from the ordeal, and this greatly impressed Winthrop, who noted their "humanity and respect". Wheelwright was intransigent, however, and not interested in any reconciliation, so the court continued with its course. Coddington later noted that "the priests got two of the magistrates on their side, and so got the major part with them". With the deputies then casting their votes, Wheelwright was declared guilty of "contempt & sedition" for having "purposely set himself to kindle and increase" bitterness within the colony. Though sentencing was deferred to the next court, the controversy now became a political issue.

Wheelwright's conviction did not pass without a fight, and his friends protested formally. Vane and some of the magistrates and deputies who did not concur with the ruling wanted their dissenting opinion entered into the court record, but the court refused. They then tendered a protest which was also rejected. For this reason a remonstrance was prepared, penned by William Aspinwall, but the initial version was so belligerent that further edits had to be made to tone down the rhetoric. Even the final version veered dangerously away from being deferential, suggesting that the court was "meddling against the prophets of God" thus inviting the Lord's retribution.

However, the resentment over Wheelwright's conviction was so high that over 60 men signed the document. Those who signed were not of little consequence either; most of them were freemen, a large number of them held office or were among the colony's wealthier inhabitants, and most had been in the colony more than three years. This petition became the pretext for severe penalties later inflicted upon the signatories.

==== May 1637 election ====
As the political aspects of the controversy intensified, Vane was unable to prevent the Court from holding its next session in Newtown, where the orthodox party of most of the magistrates and ministers stood a better chance of winning if the elections were held away from Boston. During election day, 17 May 1637, Vane wanted to read a petition in defense of Wheelwright, but Winthrop and his party insisted the elections take place first, and then the petition be heard. Following clamor and debate, the majority of freemen, wanting the election to take place, went with Winthrop to one side of the Newtown common and elected him governor in place of Vane. After this, additional measures were taken against the free grace advocates, and in the election of magistrates, those who supported Wheelwright were left out. In addition, the Court passed a law that no "strangers" could be received within the colony for longer than three weeks without the Court's permission. Winthrop declared this law as being necessary to prevent new immigrants from being added to the number of his "free grace" opponents.

==== Order of banishment ====
When the court met again in August 1637, Wheelwright was informed that if he would retract his obnoxious opinions "he might expect favor". To this he responded that if he were guilty of sedition, he ought to be put to death, and if the court intended to sentence him, he should appeal to the king. No further action was taken, and his sentencing was again deferred.

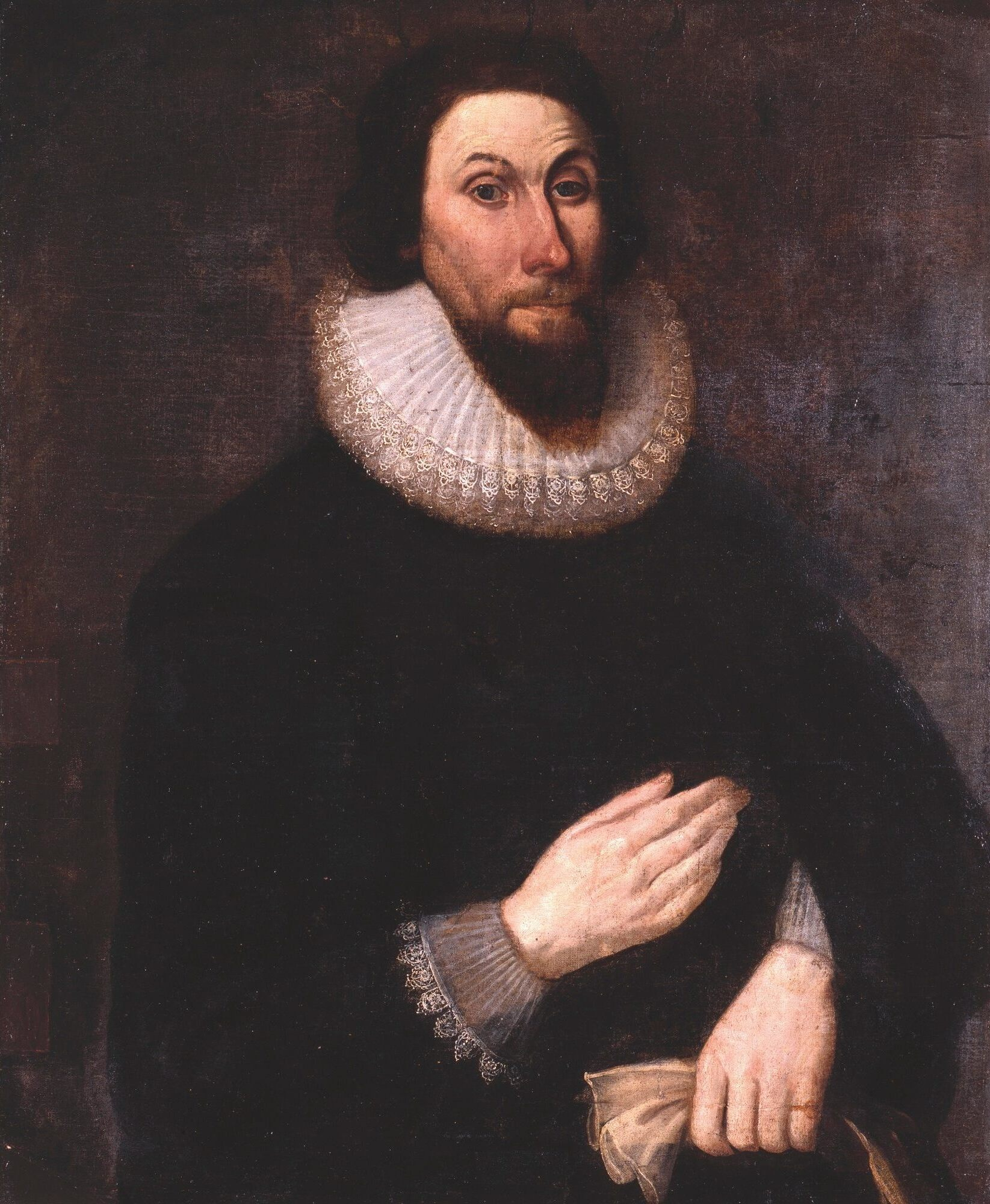
John Winthrop was the governor and presiding judge when Wheelwright was banished from the Massachusetts colony.

The next session of the General Court began on 2 November 1637 at the meeting house on Spring Street in Newtown. Wheelwright biographer Charles Bell wrote that the purpose of the meeting was to "rid the colony of the sectaries who would not be dragooned into the abandonment of their convictions". One of the first orders of business on that Monday was to deal with Wheelwright, whose case had been long deferred by Winthrop in hopes that he might finally see the error of his ways. When asked if he was ready to confess his offenses, Wheelwright responded that "he was not guilty, that he had preached nothing but the truth of Christ, and he was not responsible for the application they [the other ministers] made of it". Winthrop painted a picture of a peaceful colony before Wheelwright's arrival, and how after his fast-day sermon Boston men refused to join the Pequot War effort, Pastor Wilson was often slighted, and controversy arose in town meetings. The court urged him to leave the colony voluntarily, but this he would not do, seeing such a move as being an admission of guilt. Wheelwright was steadfast in his demeanor, but was not sentenced as the court adjourned for the evening. On Tuesday, after further argument in the case, the court declared him guilty and read the sentence:

Mr. John Wheelwright being formerly convicted of contempt and sedition, and now justifying himselfe and his former practise, being to the disturbance of the civill peace, hee is by the Court disfranchized and banished.

— Massachusetts General Court, 3 November 1637

Wheelwright was initially given until March to leave the colony, but when ordered not to preach during the interim, he refused, and was then given two weeks to depart the jurisdiction. When asked to give security for his peaceful departure, he declined, but later realized the futility of defiance after spending a night in custody. When directed not to preach during his two weeks of preparation, he again refused, and this time the court determined that such an injunction was not worth pursuing.

== Exeter, Wells, and Hampton ==
=== Exeter ===
Following the events of the Antinomian Controversy, some families went north with Wheelwright into the Province of New Hampshire, and others went south with the Hutchinsons to Aquidneck Island. With some loyal friends, Wheelwright removed to the Piscataqua region about 50 miles (80 km) north of Boston and spent the severe winter of 1637 to 1638 at Squamscott. Following the winter, he purchased the rights of the Indian sagamore of Wehanownouit and his son, and founded the town of Exeter, New Hampshire, on 3 April 1638. His wife, children, and mother-in-law left Mount Wollaston to reach the embryo settlement at about this time. About 20 married men were there by spring 1638, roughly half of whom had had ties with Wheelwright back in Lincolnshire, England.

Almost immediately a house of worship was built with Wheelwright as the pastor. The need of a government soon became apparent, and in 1640 a combination (governing agreement) was drawn up by Wheelwright and signed by himself, the members of the church, and other area inhabitants. By contrast to the turmoils that infected the settlement at Aquidneck, Wheelwright's Exeter community began smoothly.

=== Wells ===
Wheelwright's stay in Exeter was short-lived, however, as the Bay Colony planted a settlement at Hampton, which included Wheelwright's purchase in its jurisdiction, and this put the banished Wheelwright in Massachusetts territory. He then began looking for a new place to settle, and two of his partners from the 1638 purchase, Samuel Hutchinson and Nicholas Needham, began prospecting the region to the northeast. On 24 September 1641 they obtained a license from Thomas Gorges, the deputy governor of Maine, for a property that became Wells, Maine.

Wheelwright purchased 400 acres (1.6 km^{2}) of land on the Ogunquit River and almost immediately built a sawmill and a house for his large family. His mother-in-law, Susanna Hutchinson, accompanied the family, and died there not long afterward. A considerable number of his Exeter parishioners accompanied him to Wells so a church was built at once, and he was its pastor. The people he left behind in Exeter continued to hold Wheelwright in the highest regard, and were slow to give up their hope that he might return to them.

==== Lifting of banishment ====
In September 1642, while still in Exeter, an application for reconciliation was made on his behalf, to which the Bay Colony replied that he would be given safe conduct to return to Boston and petition the court. While he does not appear to have acted in that regard, Massachusetts was interested in mending fences, and without solicitation they again invited him to the General Court to be held on 10 May 1643. This prompted him to communicate with some of the ministers there, and they were so pleased with his demeanor that they likely coached him on how to frame a letter to the General Court. He wrote this letter on 10 September, and it reached Boston on 4 October 1643. The court was heavily inclined to retract the order of banishment, and again he was offered safe conduct to present his case to the court. John Winthrop had even sent a personal letter to him, to which he responded. In this letter Wheelwright now rested his claim for acquittal on justice, rather than mercy. He was not willing to desert his principles, though he "made a manly concession of his error, to bring about reconciliation and peace, as was eminently becoming his sacred calling". Upon receipt of Wheelwright's second letter, Winthrop recommended that he appear in court in person, but this he was not willing to do. The matter then rested until 29 May 1644 when the legislature acted without Wheelwright's physical presence, and made the following pronouncement:

that Mr. Wheelwright (upon piticular, solenme and serious acknowledgmt & concession by letter, of his evill carriages & of ye Ct's justice upon him for them) hath his banishmt taken of, & is received in as a member of this commonwealth.

— Massachusetts General Court, 29 May 1644

The added italics show that the Court perverted the honest intent of his letters, and extended to him their grace based on an admission he never made.

==== Mercurius Americanus ====
While this correspondence was taking place, another issue arose when, in early 1644, A Short Story of the Rise, reign and ruin of the Antinomians, Familists & Libertines that infected the Churches of New England... was published in London. The author of the work was never stated, though the Reverend Thomas Weld provided the introduction and preface. Scholars through the years have almost unanimously attributed the authorship of this work to John Winthrop, and Cotton said as much in a book he published in 1648. It was hardly a balanced account of events, and Wheelwright's biographer Charles Bell wrote that "it may be characterized as a very bitter and partisan production, even for that day".

Wheelwright received intelligence concerning this publication at about the time he received the letter lifting his banishment with its unwarranted assumptions. He was deeply stung by the tenor of this work, coming at a time when he was making serious inroads into putting the events of the controversy behind him with the help and encouragement of some influential magistrates and ministers in the Bay Colony. He did not want his friends and relatives in England to get their impressions of his time in New England from this unfair account of those who had opposed him. To defend his character, Wheelwright obtained the assistance of some friends to help him publish a response to Short Story. In 1645, Mercurius Americanus was published in London under the name of John Wheelwright, Jr., presumably his son, who was in England attending Jesus College, Cambridge at the time. Bell says of this work, "in tone and temper, it is incontestably superior to the Short Story, and, while devoted especially to the vindication of its author's doctrinal views, agreeably to the school of polemics then in vogue, it contains some key retorts upon his detractors, and indicates a mind trained to logical acuteness, and imbued with the learning of the times".

=== Hampton ===
After more than five years at Wells, Wheelwright received an invitation from the church and town of Hampton, then under the jurisdiction of Massachusetts, to join the Reverend Timothy Dalton as a pastor of the church there. Without apparent hesitation he went there in the spring of 1647 and entered into a written agreement with a committee of the church and town. He was installed as the minister on 12 April 1647 by some accounts, or 24 June 1647 by another. The job afforded the 55-year-old Wheelwright with a larger salary than the parish at Wells did, an important consideration given the large size of his family. No longer in a frontier setting, he was now within reach of professional brethren and laymen of culture and social refinement, more aligned with his educational background.

==== Vindication by the court ====
While the town acknowledged his service with gifts of land and remuneration, their greatest gift came in a different form—a vindication from the Massachusetts General Court. The Short Story, prefaced by Reverend Weld, was largely accepted in England, and had been endorsed by the prominent Scottish divine, Reverend Samuel Rutherford. Wheelwright had probably long felt that some reparation was due for the attitudes conveyed in both the Short Story and in his release from banishment, and his Hampton townsmen were likely well aware of this. On 1 May 1654 they drafted a petition to the legislature, and on 3 May the General Court made the following declaration: that they were

not willing to recall those uncomfortable differences that formerly passed betwixt this Court and Mr. Wheelwright, concerning matters of religion or practise, nor do they know what Mr. Rutherford or Mr Wells [Weld] hath charged him with, yet they judg meete to certifie that Mr. Wheelwright hath long since given such satisfaction both to the Court & elders generally as that he is now, & so for many years hath bin, an officer in ye church at Hampton wthin [sic] o[u]r jurisdiction, & yt w[i]thout offence to any so far as we know & as we are informed, he hath been a useful & psitable [sic] instrument of doinge much good in that church.

— Massachusetts General Court, 3 May 1654

==== Self-published vindication ====
While his vindication from the Massachusetts court allowed Wheelwright to mend his relationships with his brethren in New England, he still felt stung by the accusations of the authors of the Short Story, and of Samuel Rutherford in his 1648 work, A Survey of the Spiritual Antichrist ... , and he was intent in clearing his name with people back in England. In 1658, Edward Cole of London published Wheelwright's A Brief and Plain Apology, whose lengthy subtitle read "Wherein he doth vindicate himself, From al those Errors, Heresies, and Flagitious Crimes, layed to his charge by Mr. Thomas Weld, in his short story, And further Fastened upon him by Mr. Samuel Rutherford in his Survey of Antinomianisme".

Wheelwright's purpose in publishing this work was so that his innocence and the unfairness of his trial be recognized, and that "his views on the process by which the saved acquired grace be accepted as correct, even orthodox". He chose to emphasize seven theological issues which he divided into three "propositions," and four "theses". The three propositions consisted of the substance of Wheelwright's doctrine, which provided the basis for his fast-day sermon. Following the propositions, but before the theses, are nine pages of text recounting the events and personalities of the Antinomian Controversy. Here Wheelwright says that justice was not served, and that he was accused of the political crimes of sedition and contempt, when the real reason for his banishment was doctrinal differences with the other ministers. He goes on to accuse his prosecutors of engaging in "underhanded dealings," and working in secret. He had learned of these dealings through a magistrate friend (possibly William Coddington) who secretly transcribed some of these proceedings and gave them to him.

In this section Cotton's defense of Wheelwright is included: "I do conceive and profess that our Brother Wheelwright's Doctrine is according to God ..." (these words published by Cotton in his 1648 Way of Congregational Churches Cleared). Wheelwright then wraps up this middle section by "vehemently accusing Weld of lying," and deceiving his readers.

The four theses stem from the synod of 1637, and herein Wheelwright portrays himself as an orthodox minister following the lead of such early reformers as Calvin, Zanchi, the Synod of Dort, Beza, Perkins and others. As his theses become repetitious of his propositions, they become abbreviated, and he returns to the accusations made in Short Story. He ends his work claiming that he was right all along, and that he was not an Antinomian.

The writing of Wheelwright's Brief and Plain Apology may have commenced as early as 1644 when Short Story was published, but based on datable events the last part was written after his vindication by the Massachusetts court in 1654. In the first half of this work, Wheelwright refers to the author of Short Story as a singular person, clearly thinking that Thomas Weld had written the entire piece. Later in his Apology, however, Wheelwright refers to the authors (plural) of Short Story, realizing that Weld was not alone in writing the material. Though Wheelwright mentions no author of Short Story by name other than Thomas Weld, he certainly had come to realize that the other author was John Winthrop, since the 1648 books by both Cotton and Rutherford mentioned this fact as an aside.

Winthrop had died in 1649 with a reputation as an effective colonial leader, respected in both England and the colonies, and there was no rational reason for Wheelwright to impugn his good name.

== England ==
Oliver Cromwell welcomed Wheelwright during his stay in England.

In late 1655, Wheelwright moved back to England with his family, to Alford, the home town of his wife, Mary. He had received his final salary payment from the Hampton church in the late summer, but was preaching in Alford by 12 December when a salary augmentation of £60 was to be granted "to John Wheelwright, minister of Alford, co. Lincoln, who has a great charge of children". This remuneration was in addition to a £40 salary already allowed.

Extraordinary events had recently transpired in England, with King Charles I executed, power in the hands of Cromwell, and the pulpits handed over to Puritans. Vane, who had been close to Wheelwright during the events of the Antinomian Controversy, had also reached high positions in government. Vane and Cromwell had been working side by side but became estranged and hostile towards each other in the early 1650s. Vane had retired from public life while Cromwell moved into the highest position of authority in England. Wheelwright was well received by Cromwell, with whom Wheelwright had gone to college, and who once described him this way: "I remember the time when I was more afraid of meeting Wheelwright at football than I have been since of meeting an army in the field, for I was infallibly sure of being tripped up by him". Wheelwright wrote a letter to his church in Hampton, dated 20 April 1658, in which he described his meeting with Cromwell, writing, "I had discourse in private about the space of an hour. All his speeches seemed to me very orthodox and gracious".

Wheelwright probably spent most of his time in England in Lincolnshire, and besides preaching in Alford he likely preached at Belleau, the estate of Sir Henry Vane "who had greatly noticed him since his arrival in the kingdom". It is possible that Vane encouraged Wheelwright to publish his Apology. After the death of Cromwell in 1658, events became less favorable for England's Puritans. After the Restoration of the Monarchy in 1660, Vane was imprisoned for his role during England's Interregnum and executed in June 1662. Wheelwright returned to New England in the summer of 1662 with several other ministers who had been visiting the kingdom.

== Salisbury ==
Wheelwright's position at the church in Hampton had, as expected, been filled during his absence, but he was quickly called by residents of the neighboring town of Salisbury to be their pastor, and on 9 December 1662, when 70 years old, he was installed there. This became Wheelwright's longest pastorate in his varied life, lasting nearly 17 years.

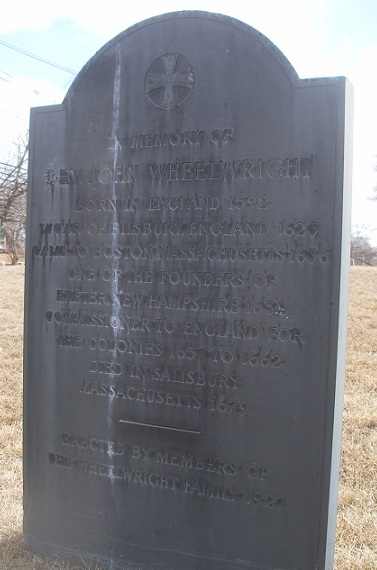
John Wheelwright monument, Colonial Burial Ground, Salisbury, Massachusetts

Probably the most noteworthy event of his tenure in Salisbury occurred very late in his life when Major Robert Pike, a layman and prominent member of his church, collided with him during the winter of 1675 to 1676. There may have been multiple reasons for the severe friction between the men, one of them being that Wheelwright was against the Quaker presence in New England, whereas Pike was more tolerant of their evangelism. Another reason may have been that during the election of 1637, Pike traveled all the way from Newbury to Newtown to vote Vane out of office. A more recent and local cause of dissension was likely over the division of Salisbury when the town of Amesbury was created from it. Pike had made certain claims of Wheelwright, to which Wheelwright wrote a petition to the court, and on 10 March 1676 the court sided with Wheelwright. Not easily rebuked, Pike enlisted support from other members of the church and town, following which Wheelwright called for intervention by civil authorities.

The intervention did not occur immediately, leaving the two sides to cast aspersions at each other. While a majority of church members supported Wheelwright, a large minority were in support of Pike, and when the brethren attempted to subject Pike to discipline for misconduct, he contemptuously refused the judgment, and Wheelwright then excommunicated him from the church. In the spring of 1677 disaffected members of the church and town petitioned the court that Wheelwright was the cause of the disturbance, and that his preaching had a tendency to pit one person against another, and requested he be removed from the ministry. Pike's biographer wrote in 1879 that Pike "opposed Wheelwright, and the arbitrary devices of his church polity, to the extent of incurring excommunication". The legislature appointed a committee, earlier proposed by Wheelwright, and through much effort was able to establish a peace. Both parties were assigned fault in the matter, Pike was required to make a concession of his faults, and the church was prompted to return him to communion. From all that is known, the matter was resolved, and did not recur.

In October 1677, Wheelwright sold his property in Lincolnshire, (purchased of Francis Levett, gentleman) to his son-in-law Richard Crispe, the husband of his youngest daughter, Sarah. In June 1679, Wheelwright was given, following an earlier recommendation, an assistant, the Reverend George Burroughs, who later became the only minister executed during the Salem witch trials.

At nearly 87 years old, Wheelwright died of apoplexy on 15 November 1679 and was buried at the East Village Graveyard, where no marker had been placed for the next 200 years.

== Wheelwright deed of 1629 ==
In 1707, a deed was found among the ancient files of York County, Maine, near where Wheelwright had brought his flock to settle in Wells. The deed, dated 17 May 1629, showed Wheelwright as being one of several recipients of land from the Indian sagamores of southern New Hampshire, and a signer of the document. The deed thus implied that Wheelwright was present in New England in 1629, even though he was known to be the vicar of Bilsby in Lincolnshire at the time. While many historians declared the deed to be a forgery, Charles H. Bell, in his biography of Wheelwright in 1876, presented the case that the deed could be legitimate.

It was known that as the vicar of Bilsby, Wheelwright was required to send a transcript of the parish registers to a central repository once a year, and this was done in March. However, of the transcripts found with Wheelwright's signature attached, the one for March 1629 could not be found, leaving open the possibility that Wheelwright had come to New England during this time frame and then returned to England. Sometime after Bell published his book on Wheelwright, the missing transcript was found, proving almost conclusively that Wheelwright had never left England during his ministry at Bilsby, and demonstrating with certainty that the deed of 1629 was a forgery. Sometime before his death, Governor Bell acknowledged the sequence of events and that the deed was an ingenious fabrication, and stated this in an undated letter to the New England Historical and Genealogical Society.

== Legacy ==
Charles Bell, in his biography of Wheelwright, provided a mixed assessment of the character of Wheelwright, calling him contentious, lacking a conciliatory spirit, and never one to shrink from controversy. In Massachusetts he was to blame for much of the temper and spirit which he displayed, when "by a more moderate carriage he might have mitigated the bitterness of the strife ..." However, Bell found him to be neither intractable nor unforgiving, and called him notably energetic, industrious and courageous. His sincere piety was never called into question, even by those with whom he differed most widely.

Governor Winthrop, although he favored the proceedings against Wheelwright, said publicly that "he did love that brother's person, and did honor the gifts and graces of God in him". New England divine and historian Cotton Mather spoke of him as "being a man that had the root of the matter in him". Historian and Massachusetts Governor Thomas Hutchinson called him "a zealous minister, of character both for learning and piety" and New Hampshire historian Jeremy Belknap styled him "a gentleman of learning, piety and zeal".

Wheelwright Hall at Phillips Exeter Academy, the Wheelwright room at the Exeter Town Office, Wheelwright Pond in Lee, New Hampshire, site of a battle during King William's War, and Wheelwright Avenue in Exeter are all named for him.

== Family ==
Wheelwright had 12 children, 10 of whom survived to adulthood. With his first wife, Mary Storre, Wheelwright had four children, three of whom survived childhood, and came to New England. The oldest child of this marriage, John Wheelwright, Jr., remained in England and published a vindication of his father in 1645. With his second wife, Mary Hutchinson, Wheelwright had eight more children. The first three were baptized in England, and two survived, leaving him with five children during his immigration to New England. Five more children were born in New England, all of whom survived and married.

His descendants include preachers Thomas M. Clark and Rufus Wheelwright Clark.

== See also ==
- History of Boston
- History of Massachusetts
- History of New Hampshire
- Province of New Hampshire
- New Hampshire historical marker no. 32: Revolutionary Capital
