= Samuel Wilbur =

Samuel Wilbur may refer to:

- Samuel Wilbore (1595–1656), one of the founding settlers of Portsmouth in the Colony of Rhode Island and Providence Plantations
- Samuel Wilbur Jr. (1622–1697), early settler of Portsmouth in the Colony of Rhode Island and Providence Plantations
