= Philip Sherman (settler) =

English colonial settler (1611–1687)

- Born: baptized 5 February 1610/11; Dedham, Essex, England
- Died: 1687; Portsmouth, Rhode Island
- Other name: Philip Shearman
- Education: Sufficient to be General Recorder of the colony
- Occupations: Secretary, Town Clerk, General Recorder, Deputy
- Spouse: Sarah Odding
- Children: Eber, Sarah, Peleg, Edmund, Samson, John, Mary, Hannah, Samuel, Benjamin, Phillip
- Parent(s): Samuel Sherman and Philippa Ward

Philip Sherman (1611–1687) was a prominent leader and founding settler of Portsmouth in the Colony of Rhode Island and Providence Plantations. Coming from Dedham, Essex in southeastern England, he and several of his siblings and cousins settled in New England. His first residence was in Roxbury in the Massachusetts Bay Colony where he lived for a few years, but he became interested in the teachings of the dissident ministers John Wheelwright and Anne Hutchinson, and at the conclusion of the Antinomian Controversy he was disarmed and forced to leave the colony. He went with many followers of Hutchinson to establish the town of Portsmouth on Aquidneck Island, later called Rhode Island. He became the first secretary of the colony there, and served in many other roles in the town government. Sherman became a Quaker after settling in the Rhode Island colony, and died at an advanced age, leaving a large progeny.

== Life ==
Born in the village of Dedham in Essex, near the southeast coast of England, Philip Sherman (often spelled Shearman) was the son of Samuel and Philippa (Ward) Sherman. His grandfather and great-grandfather were both named Henry Sherman. In 1633, he arrived in the Massachusetts Bay Colony, settling in Roxbury, where he was made a freeman the following year.

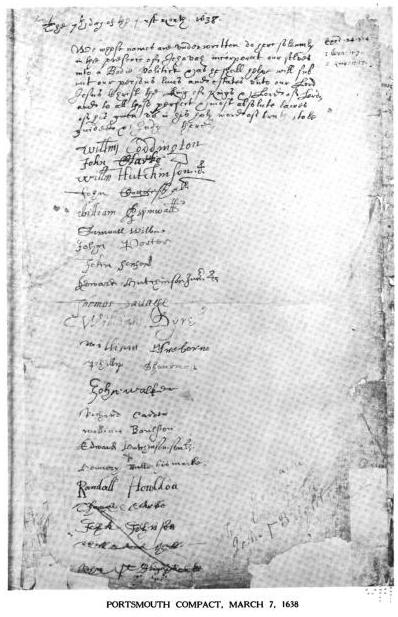
Portsmouth Compact with Sherman's signature 13th on the list

In time, Sherman became attracted to the preachings of the dissident ministers John Wheelwright and Anne Hutchinson, during the so-called Antinomian Controversy, and following their banishment from the Massachusetts colony, Sherman and many other followers were disarmed. On 20 November 1637, he and others were ordered to deliver up all guns, pistols, swords, powder, and shot because the "opinions and revelations of Mr. Wheelwright and Mrs. Hutchinson have seduced and led into dangerous errors many of the people here in New England." The Roxbury church records give this account of Sherman, "He came into the land in the year 1632 [sic; should read 1633], a single man, & after married Sarah Odding, the daughter o[f] the wife of John Porter by a former husband. This man was of melancholy temper, he lived honestly & comfortably among us several years, upon a just calling went for England & returned again with a blessing: but after his father-in-law John Porter was so carried away with these opinions of familism & schism he followed them & removed with them to the Iland, he behaved himself sinfully in these matters (as may appear in the story) & was cast out of the church."

Scores of the followers of Wheelwright and Hutchinson were ordered out of the Massachusetts colony, but before leaving, a group of them, including Sherman, signed what is sometimes called the Portsmouth Compact, establishing a non-sectarian civil government upon the universal consent of the inhabitants, with a Christian focus. Planning initially to settle in New Netherland, the group was persuaded by Roger Williams to purchase some land of the Indians on the Narragansett Bay. They settled on the north east end of Aquidneck Island, and established a settlement they called Pocasset, but in 1639 changed the name to Portsmouth. William Coddington was elected the first judge (governor) of the settlement.

Sherman was in Portsmouth by May 1638 when he was present at a general meeting, and the following year, he was selected as Secretary. In 1640, he and four others were chosen to lay out lands within the town, and the following year, he was made a freeman. From 1648 to 1651, he was the General Recorder for the town, and from 1649 to 1656, he was the town clerk. He sat on the Portsmouth town council for many years from 1649 to 1657, and again in the early 1670s, but appears to have stayed out of public service between 1657 and 1665. From 1665 to 1667, he once again served in a civil capacity when he was elected as a Deputy from Portsmouth.

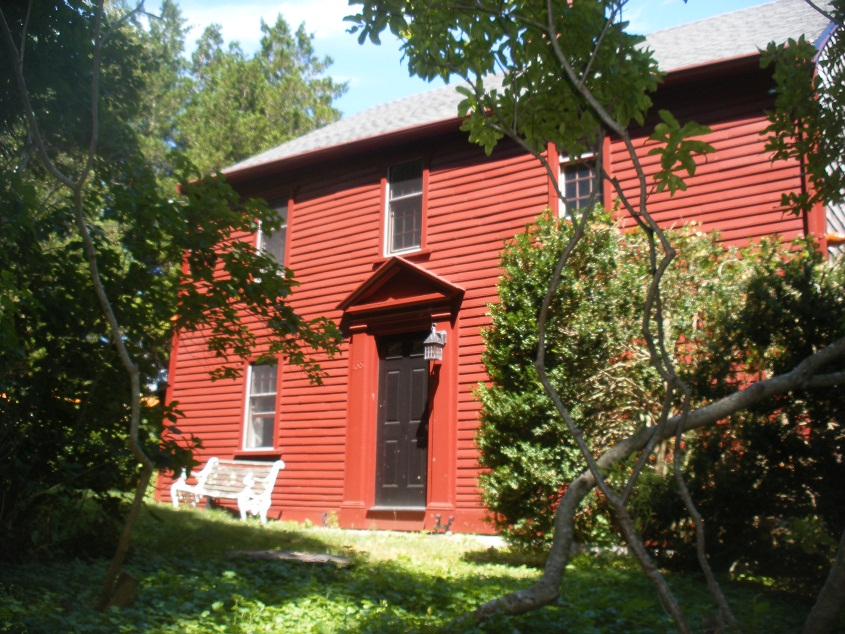
Philip Sherman house, Portsmouth

Though Sherman was never the governor or deputy governor of the colony, that he was highly esteemed by his fellow citizens was made very clear in 1676, during the difficult times of King Philip's War. On 4 April in that year, it was voted by the General Assembly that "in these troublesome times and straits in this Colony, this Assembly desiring to have the advice and concurrence of the most judicious inhabitants, if it may be had for the good of the whole, do desire at their next sitting the company and counsel of...Philip Shearman.." and 15 others, including several former governors and deputy governors such as Benedict Arnold, Gregory Dexter, and James Barker. Sherman wrote his will on 30 July 1681, and it was proved on 22 March 1687. He had become a member of the Religious Society of Friends, better known as Quakers. His house, originally built in 1670, still stands in Portsmouth as a private residence, though moved from its original location.

== Family and descendants ==
While still living in Roxbury, in the Massachusetts colony, Sherman married Sarah Odding, the daughter of William and Margaret Odding. He and Sarah had a large family of at least 11 children, most of whom survived childhood, married, and had large families. Sherman's mother-in-law, Margaret Odding, married secondly John Porter, another signer of the Portsmouth Compact. With Margaret, Porter had one child, Hannah, who married Samuel Wilbur, Jr., whose father, Samuel Wilbore was another signer of the compact. Among the many descendants of Philip and Sarah Sherman are former United States Presidents George H. W. Bush and George W. Bush. Other descendants include James S. Sherman, Susan B. Anthony, Janis Joplin, Sir Winston Churchill, Lyndon LaRouche, Conrad Aiken, Mamie Eisenhower, Taylor Swift and possibly Marilyn Monroe.

=== Ancestry ===
The ancestry of Philip Sherman is covered in Roy V. Sherman's 1968 genealogy of the family, with additional material published in 2013 by Michael Wood.

Ancestors of Philip Sherman (settler)

8. Henry Sherman (c.1524-c.1590)
4. Henry Sherman (c.1545-1610)
9. Agnes Butter (died 1580)
2. Samuel Sherman (1573-1616)
10. John Lawrence
5. Susan Lawrence (c.1548-1610)
1. Philip Sherman (1611-1687)
12. John Ward
6. Lancelot Ward
13. Margaret Parson
3. Phillipp Ward (c.1575-after 1617)
7. Joan

== See also ==
- List of early settlers of Rhode Island
- List of the oldest buildings in Rhode Island
- Colony of Rhode Island and Providence Plantations
