= Gideon Cornell =

American judge

1st Chief Justice of the Rhode Island Supreme Court
- In office May 1747 – January 1749
- Preceded by: Office established
- Succeeded by: Joshua Babcock

Personal details
- Born: 5 July 1710 Portsmouth, Rhode Island
- Died: 1766 (aged 55–56) Kingston, Jamaica
- Spouse: Rebecca Vaughan
- Children: Gideon, Rebecca
- Parent(s): Thomas Cornell and Martha Freeborn
- Occupation: Deputy, assistant, chief justice

Gideon Cornell (1710–1766) was a farmer, trader and judge who became the first Chief Justice of the Rhode Island Supreme Court, serving from 1747 to 1749.

== Ancestry and early life ==
Born July. 5, 1710 in Portsmouth, Rhode Island, Gideon Cornell was the son of Martha Freeborn and Thomas Cornell, who was elected several times as an assistant and deputy (representative) from Portsmouth. Cornell descended from Thomas Cornell who came from Saffron Walden, County Essex, England, and settled in Portsmouth in the Rhode Island colony, and later in New Netherland. He also descended from Thomas Hazard, one of the nine founding settlers of Newport, Rhode Island, and from William Freeborn, who was one of the 23 signers of the Portsmouth Compact which established the first government in the Rhode Island colony.

Upon his father's death in 1728, Cornell inherited a large amount of land in Rhode Island and Jamaica and a substantial sum of money. At the age of 21 in 1731 Cornell became a freeman of Portsmouth. On 22 February 1732 he married in Newport Rebecca Vaughan, the daughter of Captain Daniel Vaughan, a ship captain, and Rebecca Weaver. Governor William Wanton officiated the wedding.

== Political and mercantile career ==
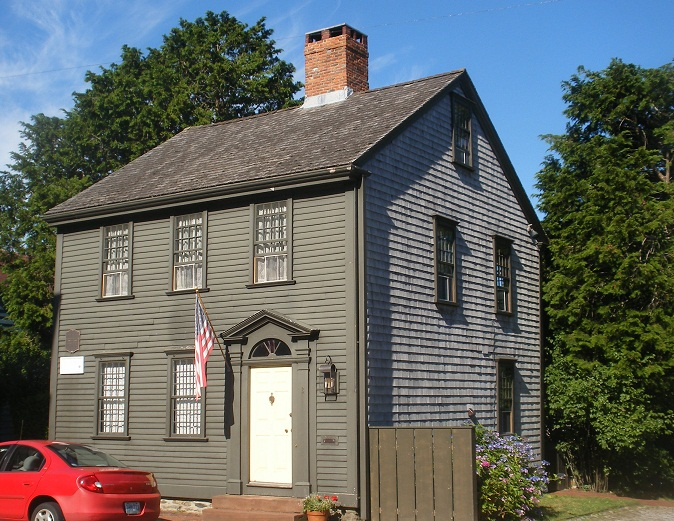
Gideon Cornell house, Newport

In 1732 Cornell began his public service as a deputy (representative). From 1740 to 1746 he was elected as an "assistant" to the governor (according to Austin, or from 1739 to 1745, 1764 according to another source), and in 1746 he was also on a committee to run the boundary line between Massachusetts and Rhode Island. In 1738 Cornell served as one of the Justices of the Peace for Portsmouth, and in 1741 was selected as one of the Justices of the Inferior Court of Common Pleas and General Sessions of the Peace for Newport County. He had initially been selected as the fifth justice "in room of" (replacing) William Ellery, Sr. who was "chosen assistant," and in 1742 Cornell was selected again to serve as a Justice of this court.

In May 1747 Cornell was chosen as the first Chief Justice of the Rhode Island Supreme Court, which at that time went by the title of the "Superior Court of Judicature, Court of Assize, and General Gaol Delivery." He was likely untrained in the common law. In the early days of the Rhode Island Supreme Court, the legislature was distrustful of an independent judiciary and non-lawyer farmers were appointed as justices as late as 1819 (although Cornell likely served as a judge prior to his appointment). His name is misspelled as "Cowell" in Warren's history of the Harvard Law School.

Cornell owned the sloop Jupiter which was seized in Jamaica for violating the Navigation Act, despite an unsuccessful appeal in 1758 to the Lords of the Committee of Council for Hearing Appeals from the Plantations for the Court at Kensington (28 July 1758). Other ships of Cornell's were also accused of trading in foreign contraband according to the British laws. Cornell was also involved in other legal entanglements, including a land dispute over mortgaged property in Newport, when in 1763 he filed a trespass and ejectment suit. The opposing party, Thomas Shearman, appealed the case to the Rhode Island Supreme Court and then eventually to the "King in Council" in Great Britain in 1767.

Cornell died in Kingston, Jamaica in 1766 where he had gone to receive a large sum of money awarded to him by the British government. His purported city house still stands at 3 Division Street in Newport, Rhode Island Cornell was a co-founder of Newport's Redwood Library, which is housed in the oldest library building in America. He was also one of the original signatories for the petition creating Brown University. The Historical Society of Pennsylvania contains Cornell's commissions of appointment as judge from 1743 to 1748.

== Family ==
Cornell had two known children, the oldest being a son, Gideon, born 10 October 1740, who appears to have died in infancy. His only other known child was a daughter, Rebecca, born 17 February 1755, who married Colonel Clement Biddle of the Biddle family and had numerous descendants.

== Ancestry ==
Cornell's ancestry after the first generation comes mostly from John O. Austin's Genealogical Dictionary of Rhode Island. The George Lawton ancestry is from Shurtleff and Shurtleff.

Ancestors of Gideon Cornell

16. Thomas Cornell (1594/5-1655)
8. Thomas Cornell (1627-1673)
17. Rebecca
4. Thomas Cornell (c.1653-1714)
9. Elizabeth [not Fiscock]
2. Thomas Cornell (1674-1728)
20. George Lawton (c.1580-1641)
10. George Lawton (1607-1693)
21. Isabel Smith (1585 – after 1641)
5. Susanna Lawton (died 1712)
22. Thomas Hazard (by 1610-after 1677)
11. Elizabeth Hazard
23. Martha
1. Gideon Cornell (1710-1766)
12. William Freeborn
6. Gideon Freeborn (1635-1720)
13. Mary Willson
3. Martha Freeborn (1671-1748)
14. Thomas Brownell (1608 – before 1665)
7. Sarah Brownell (c.1641-1676)
15. Anne Bourne (1607 – after 1665)

== Images ==
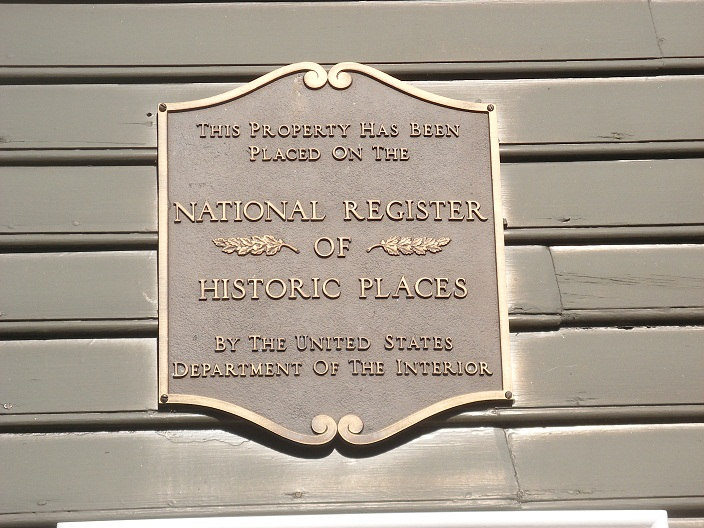
NRHP plaque affixed to house
