= Clement Weaver =

British-born American farmer and House of Deputies member

- Born: c.1620 Glastonbury, England
- Died: 1683; Newport, Rhode Island
- Other names: Clement Weaver Jr., Sergeant Clement Weaver
- Occupations: Wall builder, Farm owner, Member of House of Deputies
- Spouse: Mary Freeborn
- Children: Clement, William, John, Thomas
- Parent(s): Clement Weaver Sr. and Rebecca Holbrook

Clement Weaver (c. 1620-1683), also known as Clement Weaver Jr. and Sergeant Clement Weaver, was a member of the House of Deputies of the Colony of Rhode Island and Providence Plantations in 1678, one of the founders of East Greenwich, and the immigrant ancestor of thousands of Weaver descendants in the United States. Clement Weaver and his ancestry and descendants are the subject of a 740-page volume, History and Genealogy of a Branch of the Weaver Family, published in 1928.

== Early life and family ==
Clement Weaver was born in Glastonbury, England around 1620. He was the son of Clement Weaver Sr. and Rebecca Holbrook, daughter of William Holbrook, a resident of that town. Clement Weaver Sr. was the son of Thomas Weaver and Margaret Adams. There is some indication that Thomas Weaver was the son of John Weaver of Presteigne/Stapleton and London, and cousin of Richard Weaver (MP).

Clement Weaver Sr. and Rebecca Holbrook had three known children: son Clement, and daughters Elner and Elizabeth.

== Life in New England ==
Clement Weaver and his family were part of the Great Migration to the Massachusetts Bay Colony, arriving some time before July 1640. Clement Weaver Sr. is listed as a property owner in Weymouth in 1643, adjacent to his brother-in-law Thomas Holbrook who came to Weymouth with Rev. Joseph Hull's company in 1635.

The Weaver family's religious views at the time of their migration are not known, but they had been affiliated with the Anglican churches of Glastonbury, and were associated by marriage to the Holbrook family who held views that were in conflict with the strict Puritans of Massachusetts. Some time after 1643, Clement Weaver and family moved to the more religiously tolerant Colony of Rhode Island.

Clement Weaver married Mary Freeborn, the daughter of William Freeborn of Essex, England, one of the signers of the Portsmouth Compact and an early member of the Society of Friends (Quakers). Clement Weaver and Mary Freeborn had four children between 1647 and 1661: Clement, William, John and Thomas. They also became members of the Society of Friends, and some of their descendants maintained that tradition for many generations.

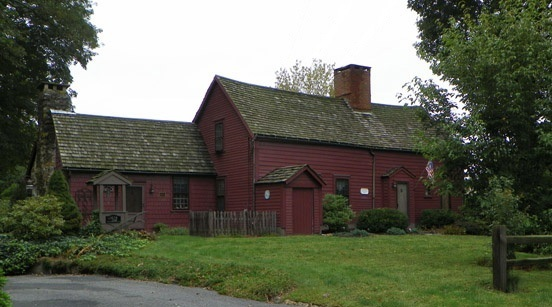
The Clement Weaver House in East Greenwich, RI, built in 1679

By 1651, Clement Weaver "Juneor of Nuport" [sic] owned multiple properties in Portsmouth. His primary farm and residence, portions of which remained in the family for over two hundred years, was west of the West Main Road between Newport and Portsmouth in what is today called Middletown. Clement is known to have owned land in Newport, Portsmouth, Westerly, Providence and East Greenwich. He is thought to have been a "wall builder" by trade. In 1655, "Clement Weaver Jr." and his father are included in a list of Freemen in the Newport settlement. Clement is referred to as Sergeant in later Newport town records - the origin and significance of the title is unknown.

Clement Weaver is listed among the 48 founders of East Greenwich who were granted 100-acre tracts in 1677 "for the services rendered during King Philip's War". In 1678 Sergeant Clement Weaver became a member of the House of Deputies of the Colony of Rhode Island and Providence Plantations, representing the new settlement of East Greenwich, under then Governor Benedict Arnold. He also served on the Grand Jury at various times from 1671 through 1683.

In 1680 Sergeant Clement Weaver is known to have deeded 90 acres of his grant in East Greenwich to his son Clement, also known as Captain Clement Weaver. The Clement Weaver House built in East Greenwich in 1679 is still in existence. It is the oldest documented dwelling house in Kent County and one of the oldest homes in Rhode Island.

Sergeant Clement Weaver died in Newport in 1683, as his will was probated in that year. Clement Weaver Sr. also died in Newport in 1683, "nearly a hundred years old". Captain Clement Weaver continued to represent East Greenwich in the House of Deputies at various times from 1683 to 1690.

== Descendants ==
Clement Weaver's descendants include veterans of the Revolutionary War and other colonial and U.S. wars, and entrepreneurs and corporate executives, too numerous to list individually. Following are some documented descendants that are notable in the areas of politics and entertainment.

- Benjamin Weaver (1781-1863), member of the Rhode Island General Assembly and State Senate, and sons Joseph and John, also members of the General Assembly and owners of the Ocean House and Atlantic House hotels in Newport
- Wanton Arnold Weaver (1795-1866), member of the Connecticut State Legislature
- Russell Weaver (1795-1866), member of the New York State Legislature
- George Sumner Weaver (1818-1908), successful author, established the Marietta Liberal Institute in Marietta, Ohio
- Oren Wiley Weaver (1840-1900), Chief Clerk in U.S. Dept. of Labor, and primary genealogy researcher for the early Weaver family
- Silas Matteson Weaver (1843-1923), Mayor of Iowa Falls, member of the Iowa State Legislature, Chief Justice of the Iowa Supreme Court
- Lucius Egbert Weaver (1846-1936), author of History and Genealogy of a Branch of the Weaver Family
- Lucetta Belle Weaver Cole (1853–1905), well-known operatic singer of the late 1800s
- Franklin Everett Weaver (1870-1954), one of the first to cross the U.S. by bicycle in 1890
- Mary Baker Weaver (1887-1978), women's suffrage activist, member of the Connecticut State Legislature
- Sylvester Barnabee "Pat" Weaver (1908–2002), president of NBC television and father of actress Sigourney Weaver
- Grant Devolson Wood (1891- 1943), American artist known for the painting American Gothic
- Alexander Haefner (b 1996)
