= William Freeborn (settler) =

- Born: 1594; Essex, England
- Died: 28 April 1670; Portsmouth, Colony of Rhode Island and Providence Plantations
- Education: signed his own documents
- Occupation(s): Miller, constable, commissioner
- Spouse: Mary Willson
- Children: Mary, Sarah, Gideon

William Freeborn (1594–1670) was one of the founding settlers of Portsmouth on Aquidneck Island (Rhode Island), having signed the Portsmouth Compact with 22 other men while still living in Boston. Coming from Maldon in Essex, England, he sailed to New England in 1634 with his wife and two young daughters, settling in Roxbury in the Massachusetts Bay Colony. He soon moved to Boston where he became interested in the preachings of the dissident ministers John Wheelwright and Anne Hutchinson, and following their banishment from the colony during the Antinomian Controversy, he joined many of their other followers in Portsmouth.

In Portsmouth, Freeborn was active in a number of minor civic roles, such as constable, member of the petit jury, and overseer of the poor, and also held the position of Deputy to the General Court for a year. He and his wife both died in 1670, five days apart. They had two daughters and one son, all of whom married and had families. Freeborn became a Quaker, and his death, and that of his wife, are recorded in the Friends' records.

== Life ==
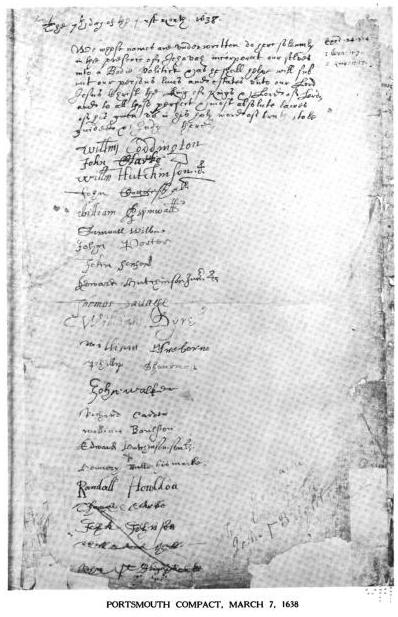
Portsmouth Compact with Freeborn's signature 12th on the list

Freeborn originated in the town of Maldon, Essex, England, and was married to Mary Wilson in the nearby St Mary's Church, Mundon, on 25 July 1625. He and his wife were enrolled to sail to New England at Ipswich, Suffolk on 30 April 1634, with their two daughters Mary and Sarah, and the teenager John "Aldburgh" (John Albro). They made the voyage aboard the ship Francis, and upon their arrival first settled at Roxbury, where Freeborn was admitted to the church that year, and where he became a freeman in early September.

By 1637, Freeborn was in Boston, when a major theological rift arose in the colony, called the Antinomian Controversy, and he became attracted to the preachings of the dissident ministers John Wheelwright and Anne Hutchinson. Following the banishment of these two individuals from the Massachusetts colony, Freeborn and many other followers were disarmed when on 20 November 1637 he and others were ordered to deliver up all guns, pistols, swords, powder and shot because the "opinions and revelations of Mr. Wheelwright and Mrs. Hutchinson have seduced and led into dangerous errors many of the people here in New England."

Scores of the followers of Wheelwright and Hutchinson were ordered out of the Massachusetts colony, but before leaving, a group of them, including Freeborn, signed what is sometimes called the Portsmouth Compact, establishing a non-sectarian civil government upon the universal consent of the inhabitants, with a Christian focus. Planning initially to settle in New Netherland, the group was persuaded by Roger Williams to purchase some land of the Indians on the Narragansett Bay. This they did, settling on the north east end of Aquidneck Island, and establishing a settlement they called Pocasset, but in 1639 changing the name to Portsmouth. William Coddington was elected the first chief magistrate of the settlement, not being called Governor, but instead using the Biblical title of Judge.

Freeborn had arrived in Portsmouth by 13 May 1638 when he was present at a general meeting there. The following year he was granted a lot on the condition that he build there within a year. In 1641 he was made a freeman of Portsmouth, and the following year he was made Constable of the towns of Portsmouth and Newport. From 1641 to 1655 he held a number of town offices, including member of the town council, overseer and collector for the poor, and member of the petit jury. In 1655 he appeared on a list of freemen for Portsmouth and in 1657 was a Deputy for Portsmouth to the Rhode Island General Court.

Freeborn died on 28 April 1670 according to the Friends' records, but the age of 80 given for him is inflated. His only known wife, Mary, died five days later.

== Family ==
With his wife Mary, Freeborn had three known children: Mary, who married Clement Weaver; Sarah, who married Nathaniel Browning; and Gideon, who first married Sarah Brownell, and then married Mary (Boomer) Lawton. Gideon served for several years as a Deputy from Portsmouth, and also as Overseer of the Poor. Freeborn is the ancestor of the first Chief Justice of the Rhode Island Supreme Court, Gideon Cornell.

== See also ==
- List of early settlers of Rhode Island
- Colony of Rhode Island and Providence Plantations
