= William Baulston =

- Born: by c.1605
- Died: 14 March 1678; Portsmouth, Rhode Island
- Other name: William Baulstone
- Education: drafted petitions and other documents
- Occupations: Innkeeper, Treasurer, Assistant, Commissioner
- Spouse: Elizabeth
- Children: Elizabeth, Pittie, William, Mary, Mehetabell, Meribah

William Baulston (c.1605—c.1678) was a colonial New England innkeeper who was active in the civil and military affairs of both the Massachusetts Bay Colony and the Colony of Rhode Island and Providence Plantations. He was a founding settler of Portsmouth, Rhode Island, was continuously elected to the highest positions in the colony, and was one of the ten Assistants named in the Rhode Island Royal Charter.

== Life ==
Born by about 1605, William Baulston arrived in Boston with the Winthrop Fleet in 1630, and was made a freeman on 19 October of that year. By 1634 he had become involved with the colonial militia, and was designated as Sergeant. In 1637 he was given a license to keep a house of entertainment, and given permission to "sell such claret and white wine as is sent for."

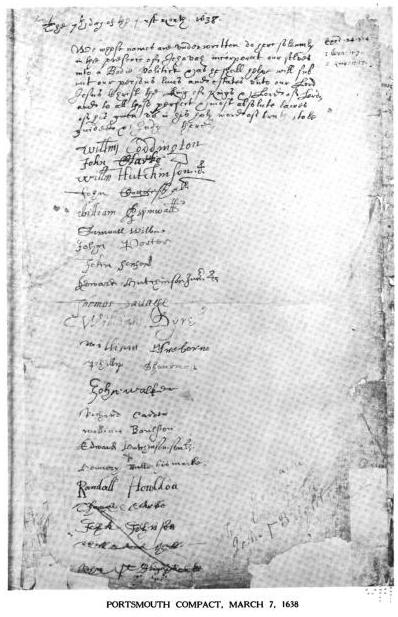
Portsmouth Compact where Baulston's name appears 16th on the list

Like most of the members of the Boston church, he became involved in the Antinomian Controversy that engulfed the colony between 1636 and 1638. When the Reverend John Wheelwright was censured by the General Court in March 1637, Baulston was one of nearly 60 men who signed a petition in support of the minister. As the events of the controversy came to a head, Baulston was brought into court on 2 November 1637, fined 20 pounds, disfranchised, and prohibited from bearing any public office. A few weeks later, further action was taken against Baulston and many others when they were ordered to turn in all their "guns, pistols, swords, powder [&] shot" because "the opinions and revelations of Mr. Wheelwright and Mrs. Hutchinson, have seduced and lead into dangerous errors many of the people here in New England." Despite the November order, he continued as a Boston selectman until April 1638.

On 7 March 1638, Baulston was one of 23 men who signed a compact to establish a new government outside the jurisdiction of the Bay Colony. The men had considered moving to New Netherland, but Roger Williams convinced them to settle near the Narragansett Bay, and they soon established Pocasset on Aquidneck Island (also called Rhode Island) in the bay. He was present at a general meeting of the Pocasset residents on 13 May 1638, and a week later he was granted six acres of land, and also given permission to establish a house of entertainment for strangers, to sell wines, and to brew beer. In 1639 the town of Pocasset was renamed Portsmouth.

Once established in Portsmouth, Baulston became very active in the military and civil affairs of the colony. In June 1638 he was selected as Sergeant of the Train Band, and in 1642 became Lieutenant. Meanwhile, in 1640 he was the Treasurer for both towns of Portsmouth and Newport, and in 1643 held the same role for Portsmouth only. In 1641 Baulston was elected as the Assistant to the Governor from Portsmouth, a position he held for 20 of the next 33 years. He was one of the ten Assistants named in the Royal Charter of 1663, which provided the framework for Rhode Island's government for nearly two centuries. He was also a commissioner for seven years between 1654 and 1663, and in 1664 he was one of four special commissioners chosen to meet with their counterparts from the Plymouth Colony to settle the boundary line between the two colonies.

In 1667 Baulston provided a "horse, furniture and rider" for a troop of horse. He continued to hold public office until 1672 when he was chosen overseer of the poor, but his absence from a meeting suggests that he was becoming infirm. He wrote his will on 11 March 1677, and died three days later according to Austin, but Anderson doesn't find evidence for this.

== Family ==
The wording of the Boston church records suggest that Baulston may have had two wives, both named Elizabeth. He had six children, of whom only the oldest, Elizabeth, appears to have survived childhood. Born about 1628, Elizabeth married first, on 17 June 1647, John Coggeshall, Jr., later a deputy governor of the colony and son of colonial president John Coggeshall. This marriage ended in divorce in 1654, after which Elizabeth married Thomas Gould, the son of Jeremiah Gould and Priscilla Grover. Elizabeth had three children with her first husband, and died sometime after 1696.

== See also ==
- List of early settlers of Rhode Island
- Colony of Rhode Island and Providence Plantations
- Massachusetts Bay Colony
