= Randall Holden =

Colonial Rhode Island settler

- Born: c.1612 Wiltshire, England
- Died: 23 Aug 1692; Warwick, Rhode Island
- Education: Sufficient to hold many important civic positions and draft letters to the King
- Occupations: Councilman, Assistant, Moderator, Commissioner, Deputy
- Spouse: Frances Dungan
- Children: Frances, Elizabeth, Mary, John, Sarah, Randall, Margaret, Charles, Barbara, Susannah, Anthony

Randall Holden (c. 1612—1692) was an early inhabitant of the Colony of Rhode Island and Providence Plantations, one of the original founders of Portsmouth, and one of the co-founders of the town of Warwick. He came to New England from Salisbury, Wiltshire, England and is first recorded as one of the signers of the Portsmouth Compact. Following a few years on Aquidneck Island (called Rhode Island at the time), he joined Samuel Gorton and ten others to establish the town of Warwick in early 1643 on land purchased from the Indian sachems.

The first few years of the Warwick settlement were fraught with difficulty; Massachusetts Bay Colony claimed their land and arrested them for supposed infractions against the sachems. The Warwick settlers were hauled off to face trial in Boston, but the charges had nothing to do with the sachems; instead, they were charged with heresy and sedition based on their religious views. They were sent to various jails in the Boston area, and they were then banished from the Massachusetts colony—and from their own Warwick lands. Holden soon after joined Gorton and John Greene on a trip to England to seek redress for the wrongs committed against them. Holden and Greene returned to New England in 1646 with a new charter for their settlement and protection from the crown.

Holden became heavily involved in the affairs of his town of Warwick and of the entire colony. During the next 40 years, he served in a variety of roles as councilman and treasurer at the town level, and in the colony he was Assistant to the President (or Governor), Commissioner, and Deputy. He was highly respected within the colony and was a leader in 1676 during the dire events of King Philip's War. He continued to serve the colony into his mid 70s, only a few years before his death in 1692 at age 80.

== New England ==
Randall Holden was born in Salisbury, Wiltshire, England around 1612, and he sailed to New England as a young man. His name first appears on the deed of Portsmouth, Rhode Island as witness, along with Roger Williams, in the sale of Aquidneck Island. William Coddington purchased the island from Narragansett sachems Canonicus and Miantonomo. His signature also appears on the Portsmouth Compact which established a non-sectarian civil government in the settlement of Pocasset (which became Portsmouth in 1639).

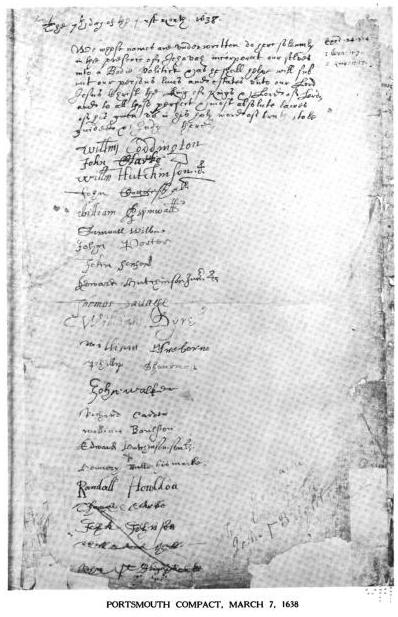
Portsmouth Compact with Holden's signature

Holden became Marshall of Portsmouth in 1638 and was given a grant of five acres. He later helped to establish Newport, but he was disenfranchised from the government there with three others in March 1641, and their names were cancelled from the Roll of Freeman of Newport. He and others reunited with the island settlements of Portsmouth and Newport some time the following year, and they were "readily embraced".

=== Shawomet ===
Holden became a follower of Samuel Gorton, and the group bought a large tract of land in January, 1643 from Narragansett chief Miantonomo for 144 fathoms of wampum. They initially named the settlement Shawomet, the Narragansett name for the site, but they later changed it to Warwick. Later that year, he and others of Shawomet were summoned to appear in court in Boston to answer a complaint from two Indian sachems concerning some "unjust and injurious dealing" towards them. The Shawomet men refused the summons, claiming that they were loyal subjects of the King of England and beyond the jurisdiction of Massachusetts Bay Colony. The Boston court sent soldiers who confiscated the men's writings, then carried the men to Boston for trial. The official charges against them had nothing to do with any transactions with the Indians, but instead were about their writings and beliefs. The men were charged with heresy and sedition, sentenced to confinement, and threatened with death should they "break jail, or preach their heresies or speak against church or state."

Holden was imprisoned in Salem in November 1643, but he was released from prison in March 1644 and banished from both Massachusetts and from Shawomet (which was claimed by Massachusetts Bay Colony). He and John Greene boarded a ship in New Amsterdam and sailed back to England to seek redress for the wrongs committed against them and did not return to New England until September 1646.

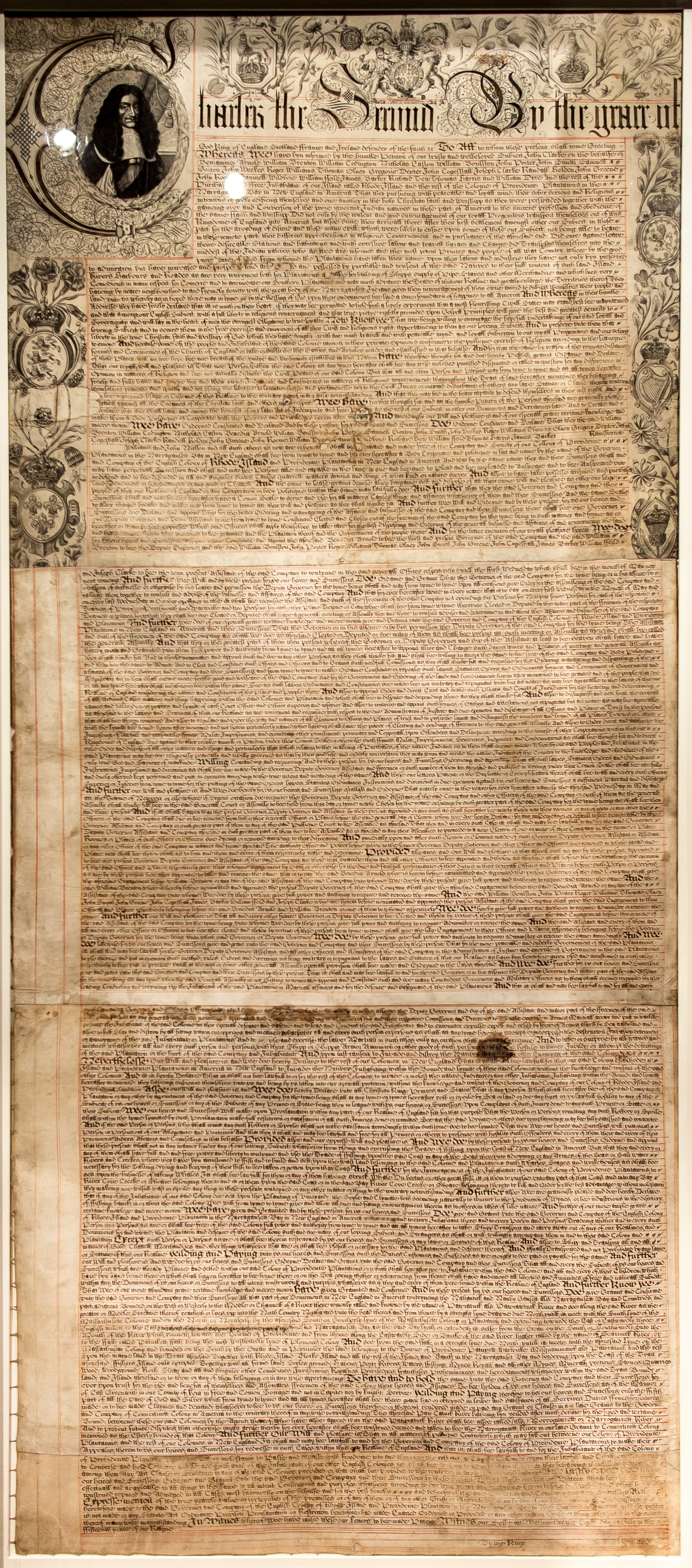
Holden was one of the prominent citizens named in the Royal Charter of 1663

Upon his return from England, Holden immediately became involved in political affairs. In 1647 alone, he was on the Town Council, was Town Treasurer, and was frequently made the Moderator of town meetings. In the same year, he was also selected as Warwick's Assistant to the President of Rhode Island Colony, a position that he held seven more times during the next 30 years. He was also elected as Commissioner for six one-year terms from 1652 to 1663, and as a Deputy (precursor to Representative) for eight terms between 1666 and 1686. Holden's name appears on a list of Warwick freeman in 1655, and at some point he earned the title of Captain.

=== Rhode Island Colony ===
Holden was one of several prominent citizens named in the Royal Charter of 1663 which was delivered to Rhode Island Colony in November, and which outlined a government with broad freedoms for the Colony. In 1671, he and others were authorized to make assessments on towns for back taxes. Holden was highly esteemed within Rhode Island Colony; the General Assembly passed a resolution in April 1676 which listed men whose wisdom and counsel was needed by the Colony during the chaos of King Philip's War, and Holden was one of 16 named.

Holden continued to be active in civic affairs into his mid 70s, and in 1687 was appointed as Justice of the Court of Common Pleas.

== Personal life ==
In 1648, Holden married Frances Dungan (1632–1696), the daughter of William Dungan and Frances (nee Latham) Dungan. Together, the couple had eleven children, including:

- Elizabeth Holden (1652–1730), who married John Rice, Deputy to the General Assembly in 1710.
- Randall Holden Jr. (1660–1726), who was very active in colonial affairs, serving for many years as Deputy, Assistant, Major, and Speaker of the House of Deputies; he married Bethiah Waterman.
- Margaret Dungan Holden (1663–1740), who married John Eldred.
- Charles Holden (1665–1717), who married Catherine Greene, a daughter of Deputy Governor John Greene Jr., in 1688.
- Susannah Holden (1670–1734), who married Benjamin Greene, son of Thomas Greene and grandson of John Greene, an early settler of the Colony of Rhode Island and Providence Plantations who was one of the 12 original proprietors of Providence and a co-founder of the town of Warwick.

Holden died on 23 August 1692 at an advanced age.

== See also ==
- List of early settlers of Rhode Island
- Colony of Rhode Island and Providence Plantations
