= Samuel Wilbur Jr. =

Settler (c.1622–1678/79)

- Born: baptized 10 April 1622; Sible Hedingham, Essex, England
- Died: after 20 AUG 1678 and before 1 DEC 1679; Taunton, Massachusetts
- Other names: Samuel Wilbore; Samuel Wildbore
- Occupations: Commissioner, Deputy, Assistant, Captain
- Spouse: Hannah Porter
- Children: Abigail, Hannah, John, Elizabeth, Mary, Rebecca
- Parent(s): Samuel Wilbore and Ann Smith

Samuel Wilbur Jr. (1622 – after 1678) was an early settler of Portsmouth in the Colony of Rhode Island and Providence Plantations, and one of seven original purchasers of the Pettaquamscutt lands which would later become South Kingstown, Rhode Island. His father, Samuel Wilbore, had been an early settler in Boston who was dismissed from the Massachusetts Bay Colony for supporting the dissident ministers Anne Hutchinson and John Wheelwright, becoming one of the signers of the compact that established the town of Portsmouth. The subject Samuel was willed his father's Rhode Island lands, and appears to have lived in Portsmouth most of his life. He married Hannah Porter, the daughter of another signer of the Portsmouth Compact, John Porter. Beginning in 1656 Wilbur held a number of important positions within the colony, including Commissioner, Deputy to the General Assembly, Assistant to the Governor, and Captain in a Troop of Horse. He wrote his will in August 1678, though it was not probated until more than three decades later. Wilbur was held in high esteem within the colony and was one of a small group of men named in the Royal Charter of 1663, signed by King Charles II of England, and becoming the guiding document of Rhode Island's government for nearly two centuries.

== Life ==
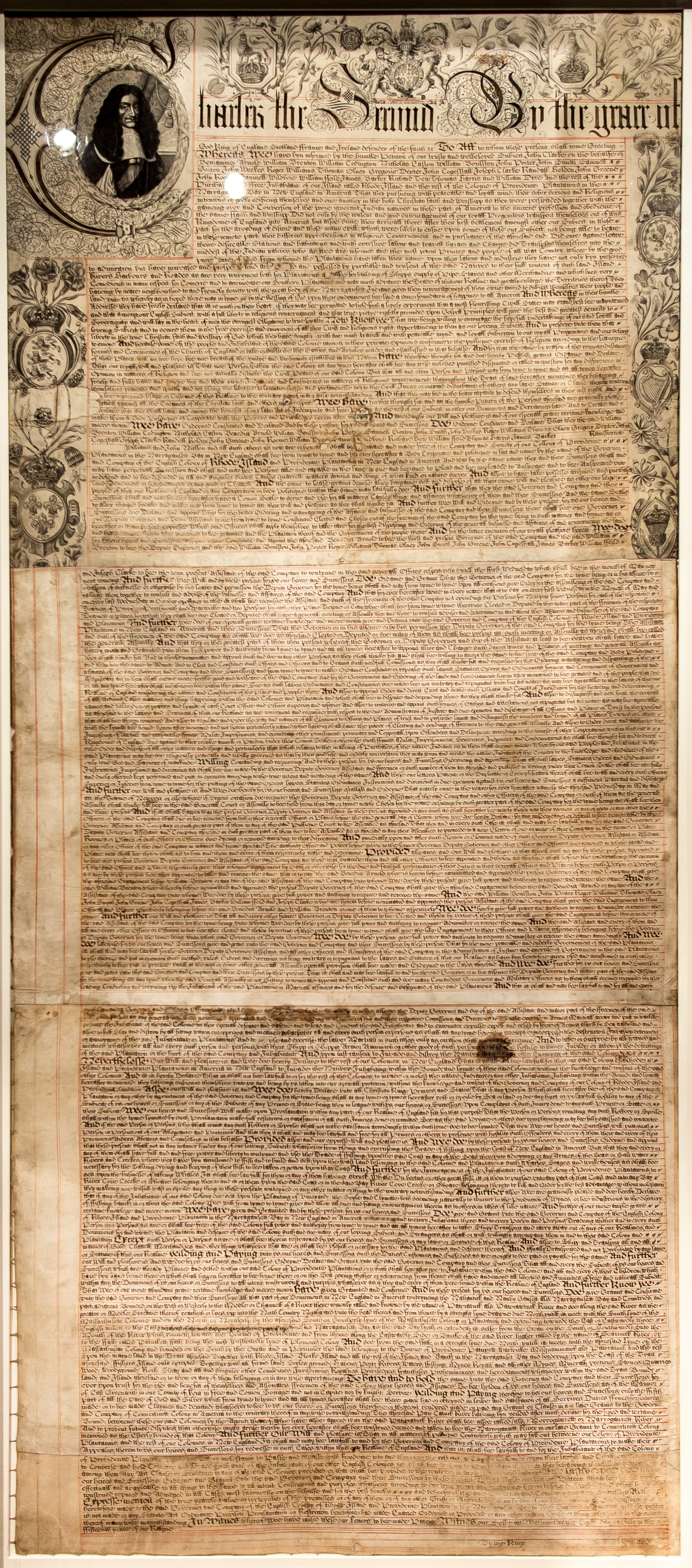
The Royal Charter of 1663 names Wilbur among other prominent citizens of the colony.

Baptized in Sible Hedingham, Essex, England on 10 April 1622, Samuel Wilbur Jr. was the oldest of five children born to Samuel Wilbore and Ann Smith. As a youngster, Wilbur and his two surviving brothers, Joseph and Shadrach, sailed to New England with their parents, settling in Boston in the Massachusetts Bay Colony, where his father was made a freeman in March 1633. The Wilbur's stay in Boston lasted only a few years, because Wilbur's father became a supporter of the dissident ministers Anne Hutchinson and John Wheelwright, and was banished from the Massachusetts colony in 1638, joining many others in establishing the settlement of Portsmouth on Aquidneck Island in the Narragansett Bay, later a part of the Colony of Rhode Island and Providence Plantations.

Wilbur was a land-owner as early as 1646 when he was ordered to "run his fence straight at the upper end of his lot." He appears on a list of Portsmouth freemen in 1655, and the following year became active in civic affairs when he was selected as a juryman and as a Commissioner. In 1657 he was one of seven men who bought a large tract of land in the Narraganset country, called the Pettaquamscutt Purchase, which would later become South Kingstown, Rhode Island. For more than 20 years, Wilbur held important positions within the colony, serving not only as a Commissioner, but also as a Deputy and an Assistant. In 1667, he enlisted in a Troop of Horse, and nine years later, in 1676, during King Philip's War, he held the title of Captain. That same year he was a member of a Court Martial held at Newport where certain Indians were charged with complicity in King Philip's designs.

As one of the esteemed members of the Rhode Island colony, Wilbur was one of a select group of men named in the Royal Charter of 1663, signed by England's King Charles II, and becoming the foundation for Rhode Island's government for nearly two centuries. Wilbur's will was dated 21 August 1678, though not probated until more than three decades later. In it he left extensive land holdings to his wife and six children, and to his cousin William Wilbur of Portsmouth. The date of his death has not been well established. Austin gives his death date as being about 1679, shortly following the writing of his will, but B. F. Wilbour writes (without citing any references) that he died in 1697 in Taunton, Massachusetts, where his two brothers lived.

== Family ==
Wilbur married Hannah Porter, the only known child of Portsmouth Compact signer and fellow Pettaquamscutt purchaser, John Porter. Samuel and Hannah Wilbur had six known children, of whom Abigail married in 1666 Caleb Arnold, the son of Governor Benedict Arnold. Their son, Samuel Arnold, was left 100 acres of Narragansett land in Wilbur's will. Another daughter of Samuel and Hannah Wilbur was Hannah who married Latham Clarke, the son of early Rhode Island President Jeremy Clarke and his wife Frances (Latham) Clarke. Wilbur's only son was John Wilbur, and his other daughters were Elizabeth, who married Morris Freelove; Mary, who married Samuel Forman; and Rebecca, who married William Browning. Among the descendants of Samuel and Hannah Wilbur is Rhode Island colonial deputy governor George Hazard.

=== Descendants ===
Notable descendants of Samuel Wilbur Jr. include Commodore Oliver Hazard Perry, American hero of the Great Lakes during the War of 1812; his younger brother Commodore Matthew C. Perry, who compelled the opening of Japan to the West with the Convention of Kanagawa in 1854; and Stephen Arnold Douglas who debated Abraham Lincoln in 1858 before a senate race and later lost to him in the 1860 presidential election. Rhode Island colonial Deputy Governor George Hazard is another descendant.

=== Ancestry of Samuel and Hannah Wilbur ===
The ancestry of Samuel Wilbur Jr. was published by Benjamin Franklin Wilbour in the New England Historical and Genealogical Register in 1959.

Ancestors of Samuel Wilbur Jr.

16. Nicholas Wilbore (c. 1504 – 1583)
8. Nicholas Wilbore (died 1611)
17. Ann
4. Samuel Wilbore (c. 1595 – 1656)
9. Elizabeth (Thickines) Harrington (died 1624)
2. Samuel Wilbur Jr. (1622 – 1697?)
5. Ann Smith
1. Children of Samuel and Hannah Wilbur
6. John Porter
3. Hannah Porter (died 1722)
7. Margaret (Lang) Odding

== See also ==
- List of early settlers of Rhode Island
- Colony of Rhode Island and Providence Plantations
