= Samuel Wilbore =

Early New England settler (c.1595–1656)

- Born: c. 1595; Sible Hedingham, Essex, England
- Died: 29 September 1656; Boston, Massachusetts
- Other names: Samuel Wilbur; Samuel Wildbore
- Education: Sufficient to sign documents
- Occupations: Assessor, constable, sergeant
- Spouse(s): Ann Smith; Elizabeth (_______) Lechford
- Children: Samuel, Arthur, William, Joseph, Shadrach
- Parent(s): Nicholas Wilbore and Elizabeth Thickines

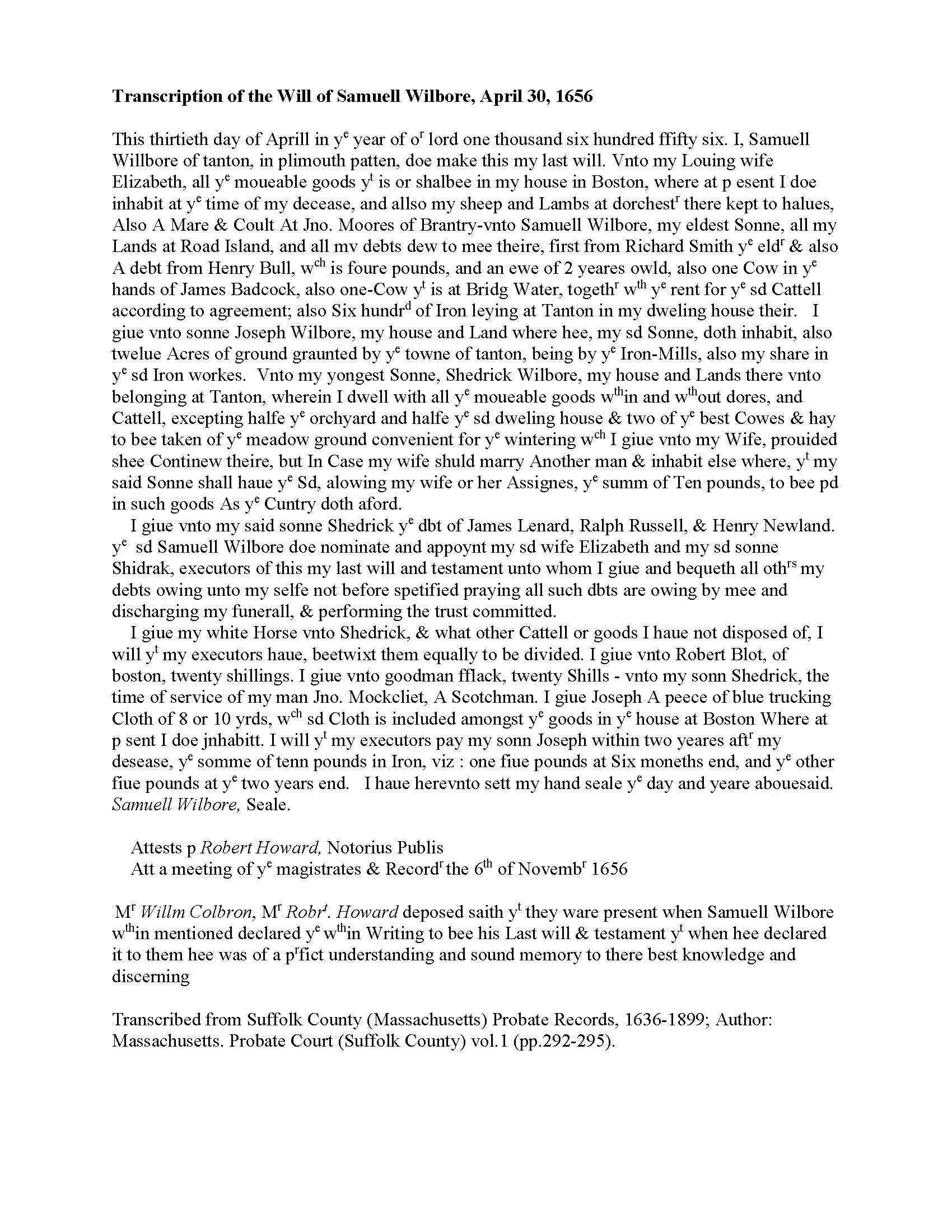
The last will and testament of Samuell Wilbore. 30 April 1656

Samuel Wilbore (c. 1595–1656) was one of the founding settlers of Portsmouth in the Colony of Rhode Island and Providence Plantations. He emigrated from Essex, England to Boston with his wife and three sons in 1633. He and his wife both joined the Boston church, but a theological controversy began to cause dissension in the church and community in 1636, and Wilbore aligned himself with John Wheelwright and Anne Hutchinson, signing a petition in support of dissident minister Wheelwright. In so doing, he and many others were disarmed and dismissed from the Boston church. In March 1638, he was one of 23 individuals who signed a compact to establish a new government, and this group purchased Aquidneck Island, then known as "Rhode Island", from the Narragansett Indians at the urging of Roger Williams, establishing the settlement of Portsmouth.

Soon after settling in Portsmouth, Wilbore repudiated the petition in support of Wheelwright and was thus permitted to return to the Massachusetts colony. He had returned to Boston by 1645, but he also owned property and resided in Taunton within the Plymouth Colony. He was living in Taunton when he wrote his will in April 1656, but was he living in Boston when he died the following September. His will distributed to his three sons all his land holdings in Boston, Taunton, and Portsmouth. Most of his Rhode Island descendants spell their name Wilbur.

== Life ==
Samuel Wilbore was born around 1595, the son of Nicholas Wilbore of Braintree and Sible Hedingham, both in Essex, England. Wilbore married Ann Smith in January 1620 in Sible Hedingham, and all five of their children were baptized there between 1622 and 1631, but their son Arthur died in infancy in England. The couple sailed to New England around 1633 with their sons Samuel, William, Joseph, and Shadrach.

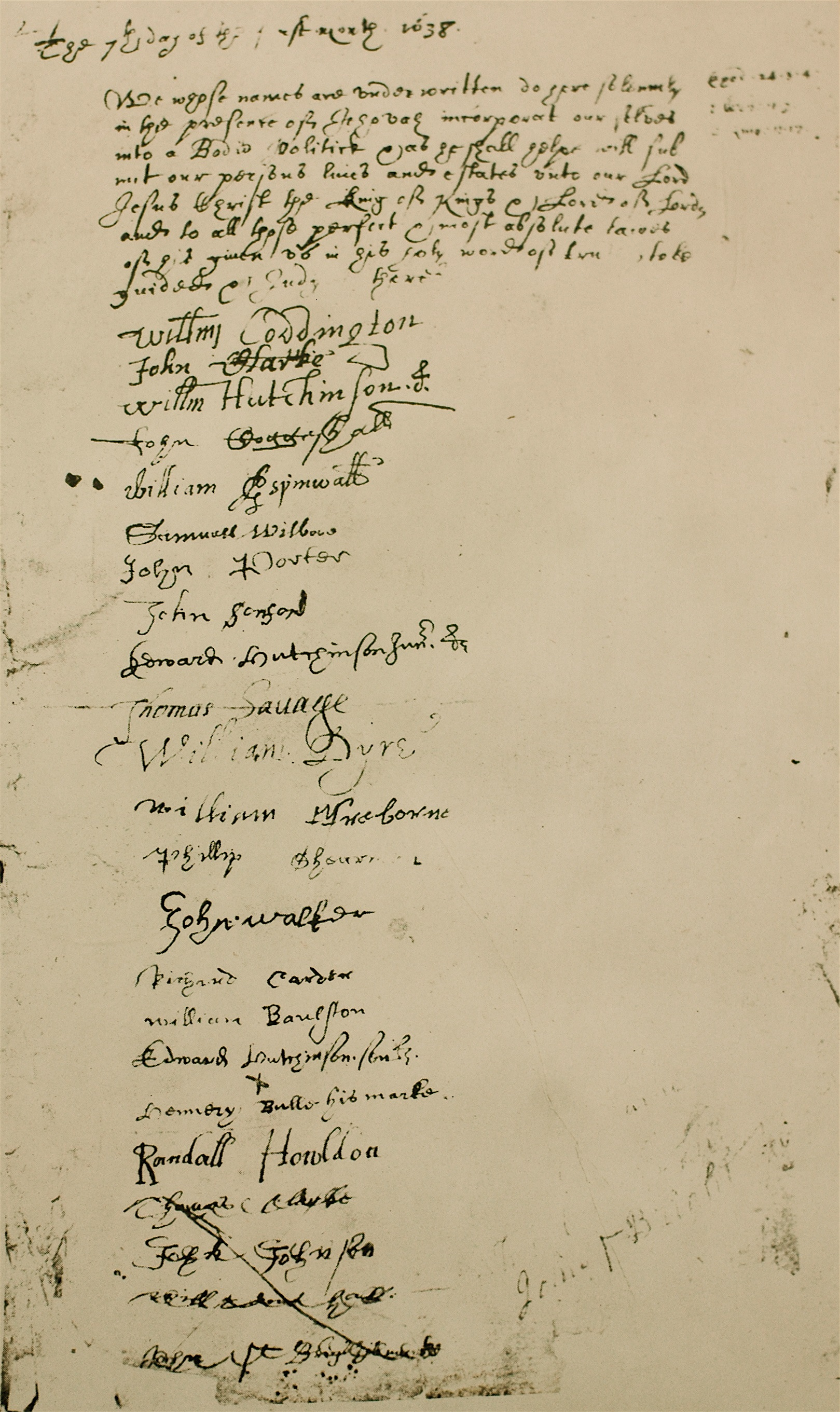
Portsmouth Compact with Wilbore's signature sixth on the list

The family arrived in the Massachusetts Bay Colony where Wilbore was made a freeman in March 1633. He and his wife were both admitted as members of the Boston church in December 1633, and the following November he was an assessor of taxes. In 1636, the Antinomian Controversy divided the colony; Wilbore became attracted to the preachings of dissident minister John Wheelwright, along with the teachings of Anne Hutchinson, and he signed a petition in support of Wheelwright.

Wheelwright, Hutchinson, and others were eventually banished from the Massachusetts colony. He and many other followers were disarmed on 20 November 1637 when they were ordered to deliver up all guns, pistols, swords, powder, and shot because the "opinions and revelations of Mr. Wheelwright and Mrs. Hutchinson have seduced and led into dangerous errors many of the people here in New England." Scores of the followers of Wheelwright and Hutchinson were ordered out of the Massachusetts colony, but a group of them signed the Portsmouth Compact on 7 March 1638 before leaving Boston, agreeing to form a non-sectarian government that was Christian in character. The group of signers then considered going to New Netherland (New York), but Roger Williams suggested that they purchase some land on the Narragansett Bay from the Narragansett Indians. They purchased Aquidneck Island, which was called Rhode Island at the time, and formed the settlement of Pocasset there, which was renamed Portsmouth in 1639.

Wilbore was given the military role of clerk of the Train Band in June 1638. The following January, he was selected as constable, and he was allotted about two acres of land in the Great Cove a month later. In 1641, he became a freeman of Portsmouth and was selected as Sergeant in 1644.

In May 1639, Wilbore repudiated his signature on the Wheelwright petition, and was thereafter allowed to return to the Massachusetts Bay Colony. He returned to Boston around 1645, and his second wife Elizabeth was received into the Boston church in November. In May 1648, he went to Taunton in the Plymouth Colony, and he owned land there, in Portsmouth, and in Boston. In 1655, he was again in Portsmouth, but he was living in Taunton when he wrote his will in April 1656. His death, however, was recorded in Boston on 29 November 1656.

== Family and descendants ==
Coat of Arms of Samuel Wilbur

Samuel Wilbore was a cousin of William Wilbore, another early settler of Portsmouth, Rhode Island.

His son Samuel Jr. was named in Rhode Island's Royal Charter of 1663, and he was one of the original purchasers of Pettaquanscutt (later South Kingstown, Rhode Island). He married Hannah Porter, the daughter of John Porter, another signer of the Portsmouth Compact and purchaser of the Pettaquamscutt lands. Their daughter Abigail married Caleb Arnold, the son of colonial governor Benedict Arnold; their daughter Hannah married Latham Clarke, the son of colonial President Jeremy Clarke and his wife Frances Latham.

Notable descendants of Samuel Wilbore include Commodore Oliver Hazard Perry, American hero of the Great Lakes during the War of 1812; his younger brother Commodore Matthew C. Perry, who compelled the opening of Japan to the West with the Convention of Kanagawa in 1854; and Stephen Arnold Douglas who debated Abraham Lincoln in 1858 before a senate race and later lost to him in the 1860 presidential election. Rhode Island colonial Deputy Governor George Hazard is also a descendant.

== See also ==
- List of early settlers of Rhode Island
- Colony of Rhode Island and Providence Plantations
- Samuel Wilbur, Jr. for ancestral chart
