= Portsmouth Compact =

1638 document establishing Portsmouth, Rhode Island

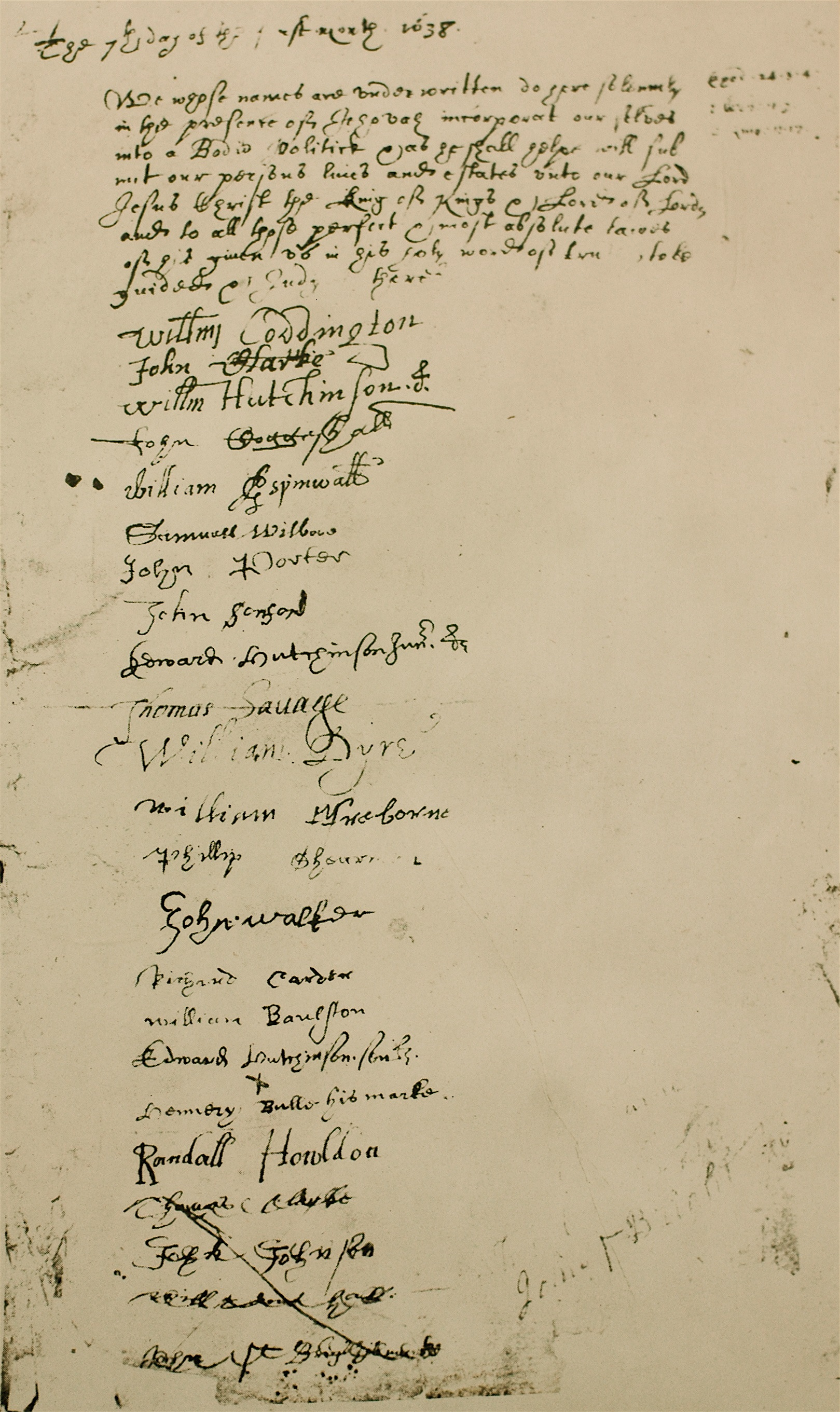
Portsmouth Compact

The Portsmouth Compact was a document signed on March 7, 1638, that established the settlement of Portsmouth, which is now a town in the US state of Rhode Island.

== History ==
The document was written and signed by a group of Christian dissidents who were seeking religious freedom from the governmental oversight of the Massachusetts Bay Colony by moving to Aquidneck Island to set up a new colony. Among this group was Anne Hutchinson, who had been banished from Massachusetts Bay following the Antinomian Controversy there.

The purpose of the Portsmouth Compact was to set up a new, independent colony that was Christian in character but non-sectarian in governance. It has been called "the first instrument for governing as a true democracy."

== Text and signatories ==
The text of the Portsmouth Compact:

The 7th Day of the First Month, 1638.
We whose names are underwritten do hereby solemnly in the presence of Jehovah incorporate ourselves into a Bodie Politick and as He shall help, will submit our persons, lives and estates unto our Lord Jesus Christ, the King of Kings, and Lord of Lords, and to all those perfect and most absolute laws of His given in His Holy Word of truth, to be guided and judged thereby.

Plaque commemorating the Portsmouth Compact

It was signed by 23 men:

- William Coddington
- John Clarke
- William Hutchinson (husband of Anne Hutchinson)
- John Coggeshall
- William Aspinwall
- Samuel Wilbore
- John Porter
- John Sanford
- Edward Hutchinson, Jr.
- Thomas Savage
- William Dyre (husband of Mary Dyer)
- William Freeborn
- Phillip Shearman
- John Walker
- Richard Carder
- William Baulston
- Edward Hutchinson, Sr.
- Henry Bull X his marke
- Randall Holden
- Thomas Clarke (brother of John)
- John Johnson
- William Hall
- John Brightman

The last four names show erasure marks or strikethroughs for unknown reasons. The first three of those four were among the first settlers of Newport, arriving in 1638, and the same may be true of John Brightman. William Hall's name may have erasure marks due to his disagreement with Portsmouth authorities soon after the town's establishment.

== Compact of Loyalty ==
The Compact of Loyalty was written and signed April 30, 1639.

"We whose names are underwritten do acknowledge ourselves the legal subjects of His Majesty King Charles, and in his name do hereby bind ourselves into a civil body politic, unto his laws according to matters of justice."

Signatories

- William Hutchinson
- Samuell Gorton
- Samuel Hutchinson
- John Wickes
- Richard Maggson
- Thomas Spiser
- John Roome (his mark)
- John Sloffe (his mark)
- Thomas Beddar (his mark)
- Erasmus Bullock
- Philip Sherman
- Ralph Earle
- Robert Potter
- Nathanyell Potter
- Wm Heausens
- George Cleare
- George Lawton
- Anthony Payne (his mark)
- Jobe Haukins
- Richard Awards
- John More
- Nicholas Browne
- William Richardson
- John Trippe
- Thomas Layton
- Robert Stainton (his mark)
- John Briggs (his mark)
- James Davice

The names of the signatories above were copied verbatim from the Compact of Loyalty. Note that the only names in common with the signatories of the Portsmouth compact is that of William Hutchinson and Philip Shearman/Sherman.

== Sources ==
- [1] The Portsmouth Compact at Roots Web
- [2] Image of the Original Portsmouth Compact
- [3] Company of Loyalty
- [4] A Brief History of Portsmouth RI 1638-2013
