= John Cotton (minister) =

Puritan minister in England, America (1585–1652)

The Reverend John Cotton
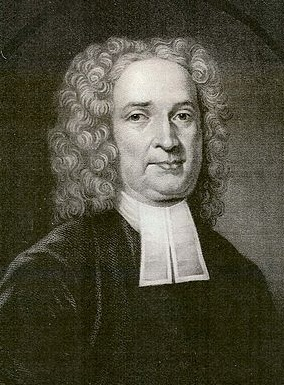
- Portrait originally identified as John Cotton. It is now thought it is probably another member of the Cotton family.

Personal life
- Born: 4 December 1585 Derby, Derbyshire, Kingdom of England
- Died: 23 December 1652 (aged 67) Boston, Massachusetts Bay Colony
- Spouse: (1) Elizabeth Horrocks (2) Sarah (Hawkred) Story
- Children: 7 with second wife
- Education: Trinity College, Cambridge (BA, 1603); Emmanuel College, Cambridge (MA, 1606; BD, 1613)
- Occupation: Clergyman
- Relations: Cotton Mather (grandson)

John Cotton (4 December 1585 – 23 December 1652) was a clergyman in England and the American colonies, and was considered the preeminent minister and theologian of the Massachusetts Bay Colony. He studied for five years at Trinity College, Cambridge, and nine years at Emmanuel College, Cambridge. He had already built a reputation as a scholar and outstanding preacher when he accepted the position of minister at St. Botolph's Church, Boston, in Lincolnshire, in 1612.

As a Puritan, he wanted to do away with the ceremony and vestments associated with the established Church of England and to preach in a simpler manner. He felt that the English church needed significant reforms, but he was adamant about not separating from it; his preference was to change it from within. Many ministers were removed from their pulpits in England for their Puritan practices, but Cotton thrived at St. Botolph's for nearly 20 years because of supportive aldermen and lenient bishops, as well as his conciliatory and gentle demeanor. By 1632, however, the church authorities had greatly increased pressure on non-conforming clergy, and Cotton was forced into hiding. The following year, he and his wife boarded a ship for New England.

Cotton was highly sought as a minister in Massachusetts and was quickly installed as the second pastor of the Boston church, sharing the ministry with John Wilson. He generated more religious conversions in his first six months than had been made the whole previous year. Early in his Boston tenure, he became involved in the banishment of Roger Williams, who blamed much of his trouble on Cotton. Soon after, Cotton became embroiled in the colony's Antinomian Controversy when several adherents of his "free grace" theology (most notably Anne Hutchinson) began criticizing other ministers in the colony. He tended to support his adherents through much of that controversy; near its conclusion, however, he realized that many of them held theological positions that were well outside the mainstream of Puritan orthodoxy, which he did not condone.

Following the controversy, Cotton was able to mend fences with his fellow ministers, and he continued to preach in the Boston church until his death. A great part of his effort during his later career was devoted to the governance of the New England churches, and he was the one who gave the name Congregationalism to this form of church polity. A new form of polity was being decided for the Church of England in the early 1640s, as the Puritans in England gained power on the eve of the English Civil War, and Cotton wrote numerous letters and books in support of the "New England Way". Ultimately, Presbyterianism was chosen as the form of governance for the Church of England during the Westminster Assembly in 1643, though Cotton continued to engage in a polemic contest with several prominent Presbyterians on this issue.

Cotton became more conservative with age. He battled the separatist attitude of Roger Williams and advocated severe punishment for those whom he deemed heretics, such as Samuel Gorton. Cotton was a scholar, an avid letter writer—he corresponded with Oliver Cromwell—and the author of many books, and was considered the "prime mover" among New England's ministers.

== Early life ==
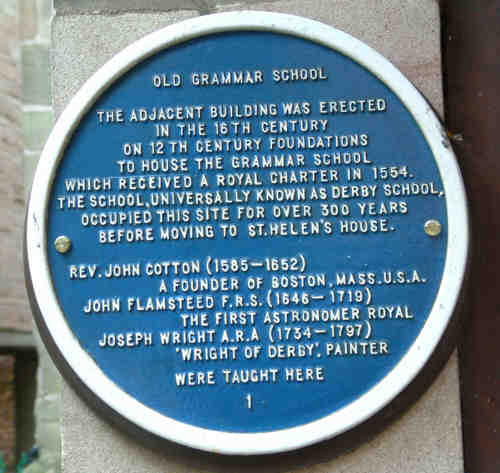
Plaque on the Old Grammar School, Derby

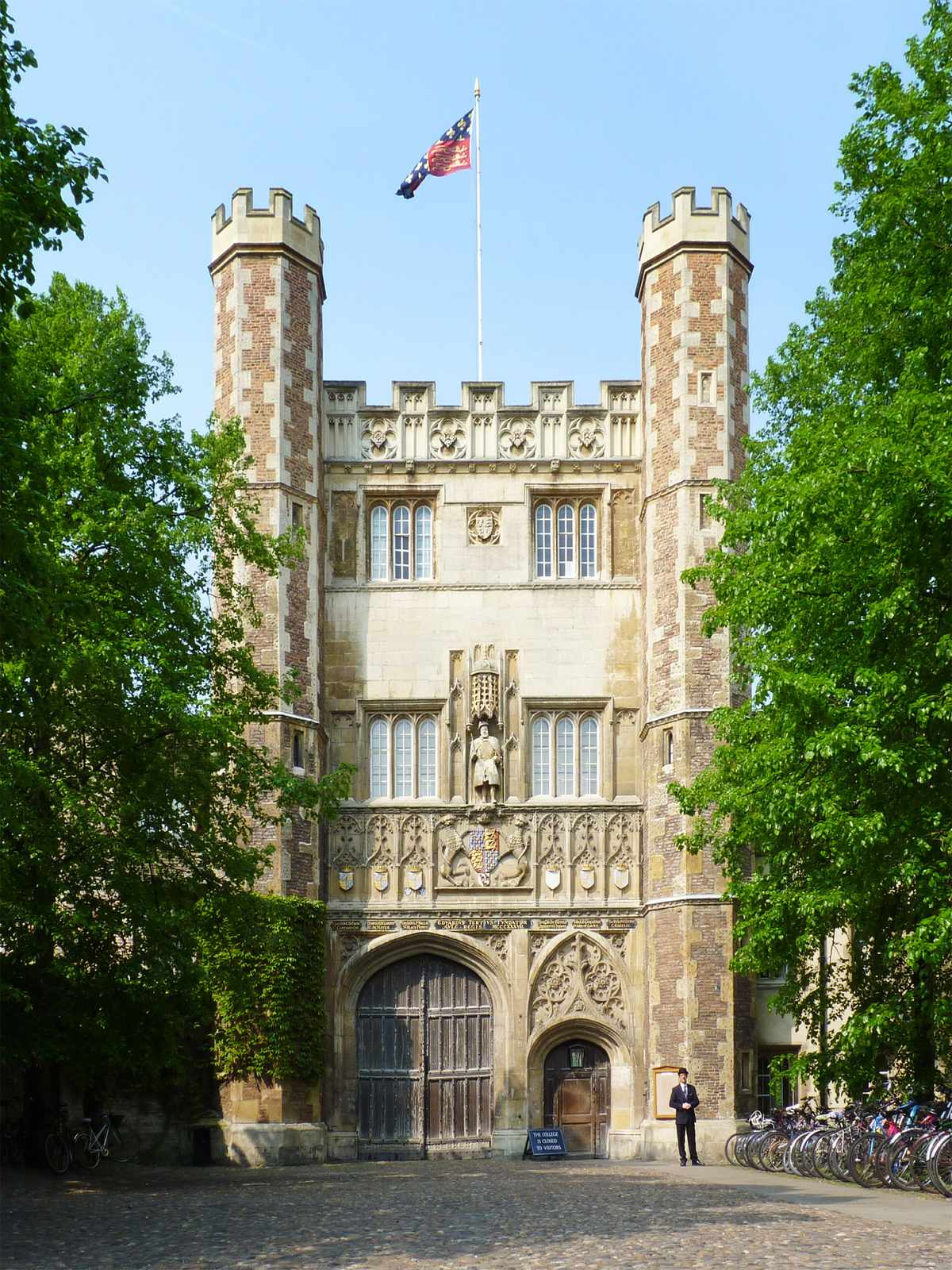
Cotton was an undergraduate at Trinity College, Cambridge

John Cotton was born in Derby, England, on 4 December 1585 and was baptised 11 days later at St. Alkmund's Church there. He was the second of four children of Rowland Cotton, a Derby lawyer, and Mary Hurlbert, who was "a gracious and pious mother" according to Cotton's grandson Cotton Mather. He was educated at Derby School in the buildings which are now called the Old Grammar School, Derby, under the tutelage of Richard Johnson, a priest of the Church of England.

Cotton matriculated at Trinity College, Cambridge, in 1598 as a sizar, the lowest class of paying student and requiring some financial assistance. He followed a curriculum of rhetoric, logic, and philosophy, and then gave four Latin disputations for an evaluation. He received his B.A. in 1603 and then attended Emmanuel College, Cambridge, which, having the notoriety of being "the most Puritan college in the kingdom" was in direct competition with Cambridge's Sidney Sussex College. He earned an M.A. in 1606 following a course of study which included Greek, astronomy, and perspective. He then accepted a fellowship at Emmanuel and continued with his studies for another five years, this time focusing on Hebrew, theology, and disputation; he was also allowed to preach during this time. An understanding of Latin was necessary for all scholars, and his study of Greek and Hebrew gave him greater insight into scripture.

Cotton remained attached to Emmanuel until at least 1618 through his friendship with the Rev. Thomas Hooker. Like Cotton, Hooker transferred to Emmanuel College in 1604 and was named its Dixie Fellow in 1609.

Cotton became recognized for his scholarship and preaching during his time as a graduate student. He also tutored and worked as dean, supervising his juniors. Biographer Larzer Ziff calls his learning "profound" and his knowledge of languages "phenomenal". Cotton became famous at Cambridge when he preached the funeral sermon of Robert Some, the late Master of Peterhouse, Cambridge, and he developed a large following for both his "manner and matter". He left the university after five years but did not receive his Bachelor of Divinity degree until 1613, following the compulsory seven-year wait after his M.A. He was ordained as both deacon and priest of the Church of England on 13 July 1610. In 1612, he left Emmanuel College to become the vicar of St. Botolph's Church in Boston, Lincolnshire, described as "the most magnificent parochial edifice in the kingdom." He was only 27 years old, but his scholarly, vigorous, and persuasive preaching made him one of the leading Puritans in England.

=== Cotton's theology ===
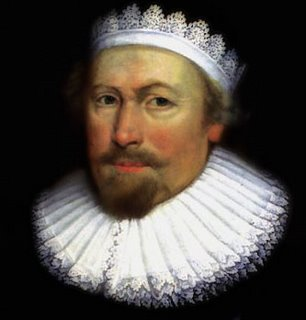
Richard Sibbes was Cotton's spiritual counselor.

One of the influences on Cotton's thinking while at Emmanuel was the teaching of William Perkins from whom he learned to be flexible, sensible, and practical, and how to deal with the political realities of being a non-conformist Puritan within a disapproving Church of England. He also learned the art of disagreeing while maintaining the appearance of conformity.

As Cotton steadily became more famous for his preaching, he struggled internally over his own spiritual condition. His state of uncertainty became one of desperation as he spent three years searching for any sign that the "Lord had chosen him as one predestined to live in glory." His prayers were answered around 1611 when he became certain that "he had been called to salvation."

Cotton considered the doctrine and preaching of his spiritual counselor Richard Sibbes to have been the greatest influence on his conversion. Sibbes' "heart religion" was attractive to Cotton; he wrote, "The ambassadors of so gentle a Savior should not be overly masterly." Once converted, his style of pulpit oratory became more simple in expression, though disappointing to those who liked his former polished manner of speaking. Even in his new subdued manner, he had a profound impact on those hearing his message; Cotton's preaching was responsible for the conversion of John Preston, the future Master of Emmanuel College and the most influential Puritan minister of his day.

As Cotton's theology changed, he began placing less emphasis on preparation ("works") to obtain God's salvation, and more emphasis on the "transforming character of the moment of religious conversion in which mortal man [is] infused with a divine grace." His theology was molded by a number of individuals, besides influences such as Perkins and Sibbes; his basic tenets stemmed from reformer John Calvin. He wrote: "I have read the fathers, and the schoolmen and Calvin too, but I find that he that has Calvin has them all." Other inspirations to his theology include the Apostle Paul and Bishop Cyprian, and reformation leaders Zacharias Ursinus, Theodore Beza, Franciscus Junius (the elder), Jerome Zanchius, Peter Martyr Vermigli, Johannes Piscator, and Martin Bucer. Additional English role models include Paul Baynes, Thomas Cartwright, Laurence Chaderton, Arthur Hildersham, William Ames, William Whitaker, John Jewel, and John Whitgift.

In the religious theory developed by Cotton, the believer is totally passive in his personal religious experience, while the Holy Spirit provides spiritual regeneration. This model was in contrast to the theology of most other Puritan ministers, particularly those who became Cotton's colleagues in New England; the "preparationist" preachers such as Thomas Hooker, Peter Bulkley, and Thomas Shepard taught that good deeds and morality were necessary to generate the spiritual activity leading to God's salvation.

=== Puritanism ===
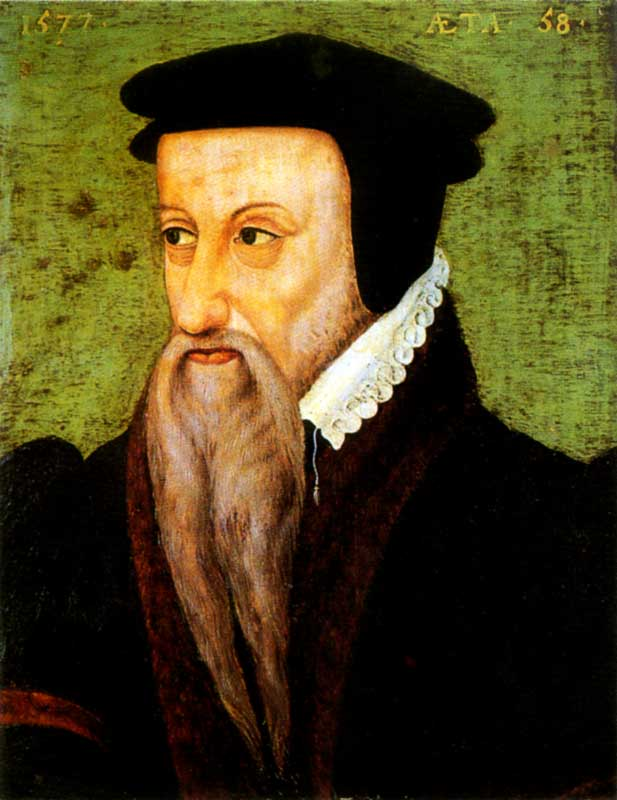
The Puritans were greatly influenced by the teachings of Theodore Beza.

Cotton's sentiments were strongly anti-Catholic, clearly evident in his writings, and this led him to oppose the established English church which had separated from the Catholic church in name only, according to the Puritan view. The English church had an "officially sanctioned form of worship and an established ecclesiastical structure", and he felt that the Anglican church polity and ceremonies were not authorized by Scripture. Cotton and others wanted to "purify" such practices and were pejoratively labeled "puritans", a term that stuck. He was opposed to the essence of the established church, yet he was just as opposed to separating from it because he viewed the Puritan movement as a way to change the church from within. This view was distinct from the Separatist Puritan view, which held that the only solution to the situation within the English church was to leave it and start something new, unrelated to the official Church of England. This was the view espoused by the Mayflower Pilgrims.

Non-separatist Puritanism is described by author Everett Emerson as "an effort to continue and complete the reformation of the Church of England" which had begun under King Henry VIII. Following the reformation, Queen Elizabeth I chose a middle way for the English Church between the two extremes of Calvinism and Catholicism.

The non-separatist Puritans, however, wanted to reform the Church of England so that it would resemble "the best reformed churches" on the Continent. To do this, their intention was to eliminate the observation of Saint's days, do away with making the sign of the cross and kneeling while receiving communion, and eliminate the requirement for ministers to wear the surplice. They also wanted church governance to change, favoring Presbyterianism over Episcopacy.

The Puritans were greatly influenced by Continental reformer Theodore Beza, and they had four primary agendas: seeking moral transformation; urging the practice of piety; urging the return to the Christianity of the Bible, as opposed to prayer books, ceremonies, and vestments; and the strict recognition of the Sabbath. Cotton embraced all four of these practices. He received a small amount of Puritan influence while at Trinity; but at Emmanuel, Puritan practices were more visible under Master Laurence Chaderton, including non-prayer book services, ministers wearing no surplice, and communion being given around a table.

The Puritan movement hinged largely on the notion that "a holy commonwealth could be established on earth." This had an important effect on what Cotton taught and the way that he taught it. He believed that the Bible could not save souls simply by being read. To him, the first step in conversion was the "pricking of the hardened heart" of the individual by hearing the word of God. In this regard, Puritanism "emphasized the importance of preaching" with the focus on the pulpit, while Catholicism emphasized sacraments where the focus was on the altar.

=== Ministry at St. Botolph's ===
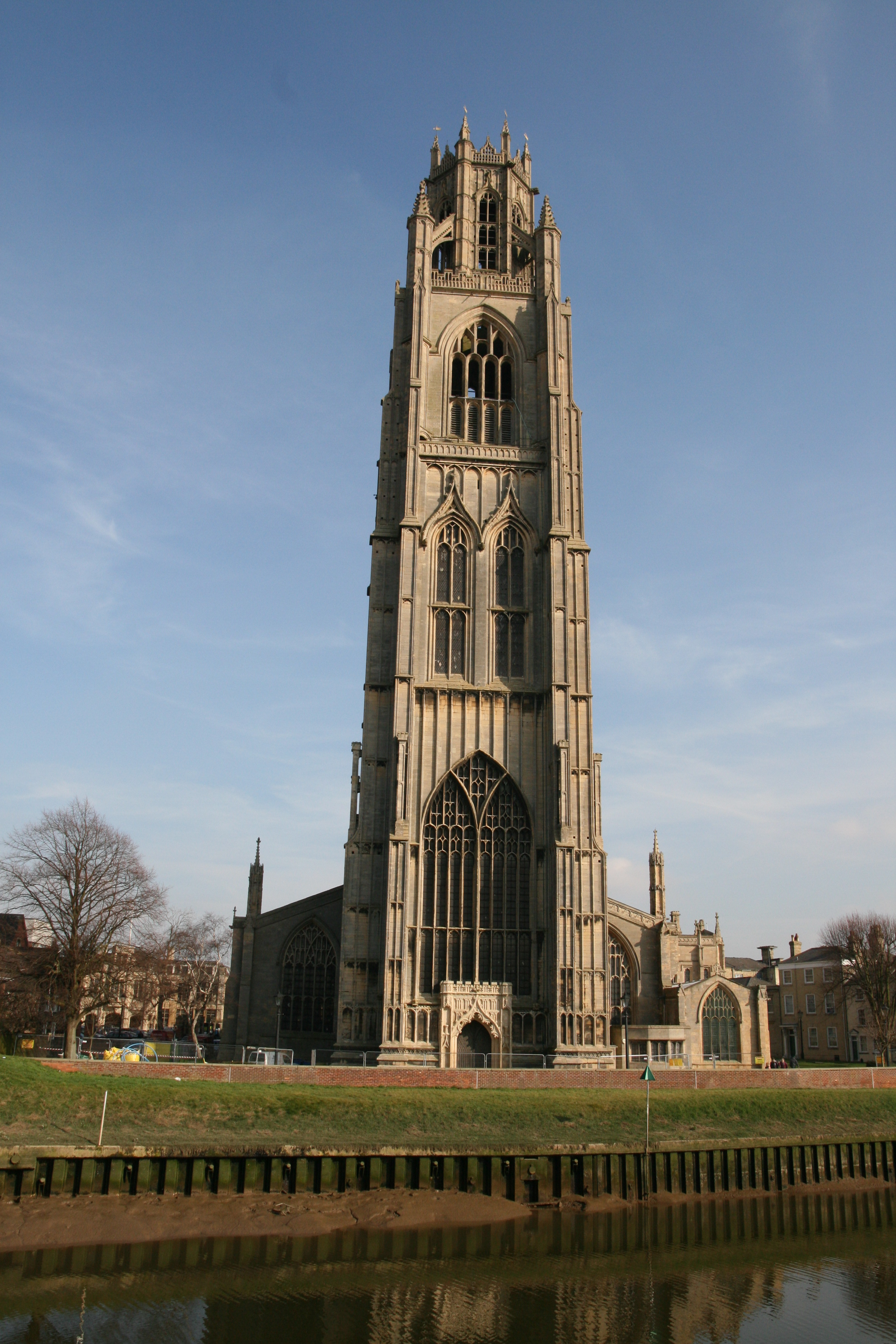
St. Botolph's Church, Boston

Puritan John Preston's religious conversion was attributed to Cotton. Preston had become a political force at Queens' College and later the Master of Emmanuel, and he held favor with King James. In his college roles, he sent a steady stream of students to live with and learn from Cotton, giving Cotton the epithet "Dr. Preston's seasoning vessel."

When Cotton arrived at St. Botolph's in 1612, non-conformity had already been practiced for nearly 30 years. Nevertheless, he attempted to conform to the practices of the Church of England during his early tenure there, until his conscience no longer allowed him to do so. He then wrote a defense of his new position which he circulated among his sympathisers.

In time, Cotton's preaching became so celebrated and his lectures so well attended that three lectures were added to his week, in addition to the usual Sunday morning sermon and Thursday afternoon lecture. Puritans throughout the kingdom sought to correspond with him or interview him, including Roger Williams with whom he later had a strained relationship. In 1615, Cotton began holding special services within his church where Puritanism could be practiced in its true sense and the offensive practices of the established church could be totally avoided. The parents of the Rev. William Skepper (1597 – c.1650) were married at St Bodolph's and William studied at Cambridge University at the Puritan Sidney Sussex College (1614–1618) becoming a close friend of Cotton when in Boston. Cotton was appointed guardian of Skepper's son, Theophilus. Some members were excluded from these alternate services Cotton offered at St. Botolph's; they became offended and registered their complaints with the bishop's court in Lincoln. Cotton was suspended, but alderman Thomas Leverett was able to negotiate an appeal, after which Cotton was reinstated. This interference maintained by Leverett and other aldermen was successful in protecting Cotton from Anglican church officials, enabling him to maintain his course of Puritanism under four different bishops of Lincoln: William Barlow, Richard Neile, George Montaigne, and John Williams.

The last 12 years of Cotton's tenure at St. Botolph's was spent under the tenure of Williams, who was a tolerant bishop with whom Cotton could be fairly frank about his non-conformist views. Cotton nurtured this relationship by agreeing with the bishop to the extent that his conscience allowed and being humble and cooperative when forced to disagree.

==== Role as counsellor and teacher ====
The surviving correspondence of John Cotton reveals the growth of his importance as a pastoral counselor to his church colleagues during the 1620s and into the 1630s.

Among those seeking his counsel were young ministers beginning their careers or facing some crisis. Others desiring his aide were older colleagues, including those who had left England to preach on the Continent. Cotton had become the experienced veteran who assisted his fellow ministers, particularly in their struggles with the conformity that was forced upon them by the established church. He assisted ministers from England and abroad, and also trained many students from Cambridge.

Ministers came to Cotton with a wide range of questions and concerns. In the years before his immigration to the Massachusetts Bay Colony, he gave advice to his former Cambridge student Reverend Ralph Levett, serving in 1625 as the private chaplain to Sir William and Lady Frances Wray at Ashby cum Fenby, Lincolnshire. (Note: Levett later became the brother-in-law of Reverend John Wheelwright, Cotton's colleague in New England.) As the family minister, Levett struggled to align his Puritan beliefs with this fun-loving household, which enjoyed dancing and exchanging valentine sentiments. Cotton's advice was that valentines were like a lottery and "a takeinge of Gods name in vaine," though dancing was acceptable, if not done in a lewd way. Levett was satisfied with the guidance.

After Charles I became king in 1625, the situation grew worse for Puritans and more of them moved to the Netherlands. Charles would not compromise with his rivals, and Parliament became dominated by Puritans, followed by civil war in the 1640s.

Under Charles, the Church of England reverted to more ceremonial worship, approaching that of Catholicism, and there was increased hostility towards the Calvinism that Cotton followed. Cotton's colleagues were being summoned to the High Court for their Puritan practices, but he continued to thrive because of his supportive aldermen and sympathetic superiors, as well as his conciliatory demeanor.

Minister Samuel Ward of Ipswich remarked, "Of all men in the world I envy Mr. Cotton, of Boston, most; for he doth nothing in way of conformity, and yet hath his liberty, and I do everything that way, and cannot enjoy mine."

=== North American colonization ===
The options for Puritan ministers who lacked Cotton's success at avoiding the church authorities were to either go underground or to form a separatist church on the Continent. In the late 1620s, however, another option emerged as America began to open for colonization. With this new prospect, a staging area was established at Tattershall, near Boston, which was the seat of Theophilus Clinton, 4th Earl of Lincoln.

Cotton and the Earl's chaplain, Samuel Skelton, conferred extensively, before Skelton left England to be the minister for the company of John Endicott in 1629. Cotton firmly opposed separatism, whereby newly formed churches in New England or continental Europe refused communion with the Church of England or with the continental reformed churches. For this reason, he was upset to learn that Skelton's church at Naumkeag (later Salem, Massachusetts) had opted for such separatism and had refused to offer communion to newly arriving colonists.

In particular, he was grieved to learn that William Coddington, his friend and parishioner from Boston (Lincolnshire), was not allowed to have his child baptized "because he was no member of any particular reformed church, though of the catholic" (universal).

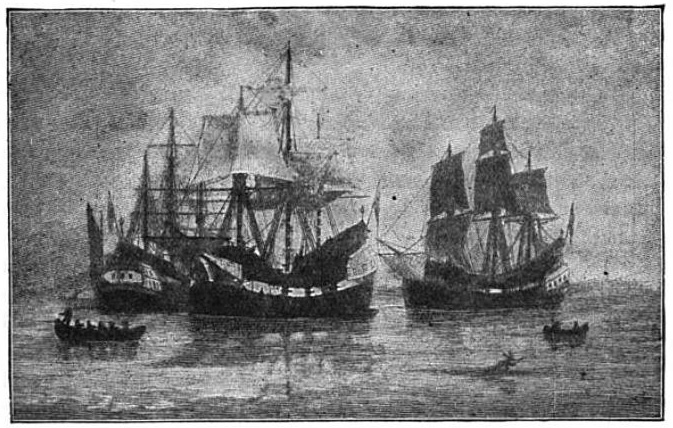
Cotton traveled to Southampton to preach the farewell sermon to the members of the Winthrop Fleet.

In July 1629, Cotton took part in a planning conference for emigration at Sempringham in Lincolnshire. Other future New England colonists who participated in the planning were Thomas Hooker, Roger Williams, John Winthrop, and Emmanuel Downing. Cotton did not emigrate for several more years, though he did travel to Southampton to preach the farewell sermon to Winthrop's party.

Of Cotton's thousands of sermons, this was the earliest one to be published. He also offered support to those who had already sailed, and he arranged in a 1630 letter for a hogshead of meal to be sent to Coddington who was at Naumkeag.

Shortly after seeing the New England colonists on their way, both Cotton and his wife became seriously ill from malaria. They stayed at the manor house of the Earl of Lincoln for nearly a year; he eventually recovered, but his wife died. He decided to travel to complete his recovery and, while doing so, he became much more aware of the dangers that Puritans were facing throughout England.

Nathaniel Ward wrote of his summons to court in a December 1631 letter to Cotton, mentioning that Thomas Hooker had already fled from Essex and gone to Holland. The letter is representative of the "emotional agony" faced by these ministers, and Ward wrote it as a sort of "good-bye", knowing that he would be removed from his ministry. Cotton and Ward met again in New England.

=== Flight from England ===
On 6 April 1632, Cotton married widow Sarah (Hawkred) Story who had a daughter. He received word almost immediately thereafter that he was to be summoned to the High Court for his non-conforming practices. This was less than a year after receiving the letter from Ward. Cotton asked the Earl of Dorset to intercede on his behalf, but the earl wrote back that non-conformity and Puritanism were unpardonable offenses, and told Cotton "you must fly for your safety."

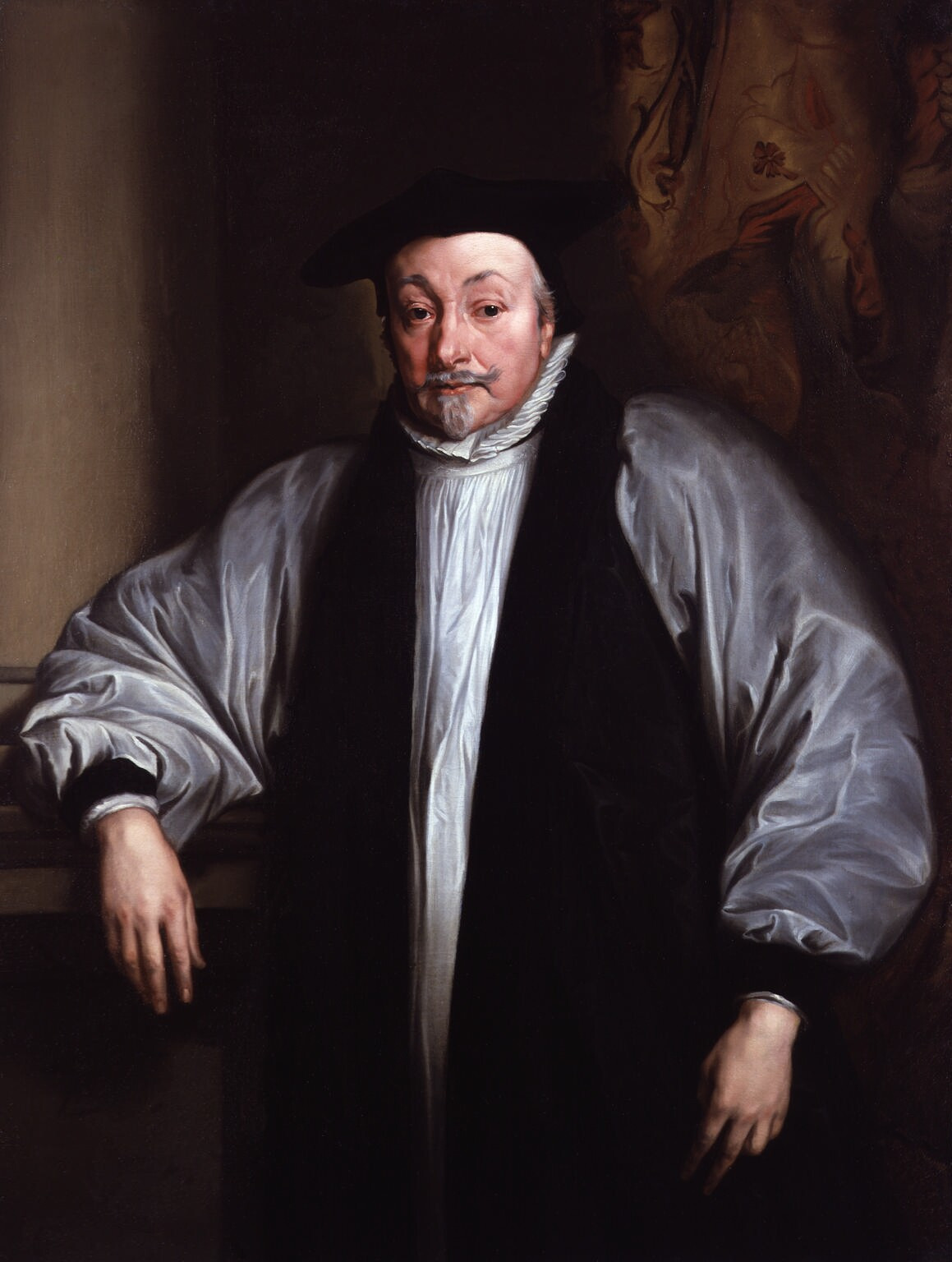
William Laud's mission to suppress Puritan practices forced Cotton into hiding.

Cotton was to appear before William Laud, the Bishop of London, who was on a campaign to suppress Puritan practices. He now felt that his best option was to disappear into the Puritan underground, and then decide his course of action from there.

In October 1632, he wrote his wife a letter from hiding, saying that he was being well cared for but that she would be followed if she attempted to join him. Two prominent Puritans came to visit him in hiding: Thomas Goodwin and John Davenport. Both men came to convince him that it would be acceptable for him to conform to the established church rather than deal with possible imprisonment.

Instead, Cotton compelled these two men into further non-conformity; Goodwin went on to be the voice of the independents (Congregationalists) at the Westminster Assembly in 1643, while Davenport became the founder of the Puritan New Haven Colony in America, using Cotton's theocratic model of government. It was Cotton's influence that made him "the most important of the Congregational leaders", and later a prime target for attacks by the Presbyterians.

While in hiding, Cotton moved about in an underground Puritan network, staying at times in Northamptonshire, Surrey, and different places around London. He contemplated going to Holland like many nonconformists, which allowed a quick return to England should the political situation become favorable and appeasing the sense that a "great reformation" was to take place soon. He soon ruled out Holland, however, because of the negative feedback from fellow minister Thomas Hooker who had previously gone there.

Members of the Massachusetts Bay Colony heard about Cotton's flight and sent him letters urging him to come to New England. None of the great Puritan clergymen had gone there, and he felt that it would put him at too great a distance to return should the situation in England warrant.

Despite this, he made his decision to emigrate by the spring of 1633 and wrote a letter to Bishop Williams on 7 May, resigning from his benefice at St. Botolph's and thanking the bishop for his flexibility and mildness. By the summer, he had reunited with his wife, and the couple made their way to the coast of Kent. In June or July 1633, the 48-year-old Cotton boarded the ship Griffin with his wife and step-daughter, along with fellow ministers Thomas Hooker and Samuel Stone. Also on board was Edward Hutchinson, eldest son of Anne Hutchinson who was traveling with his uncle Edward. Cotton's wife bore their son during the voyage, and they named him Seaborn. Eighteen months after his departure from England, Cotton wrote that his decision to emigrate was not difficult to make; he found preaching in a new land to be far preferable to "sitting in a loathsome prison."

== New England ==
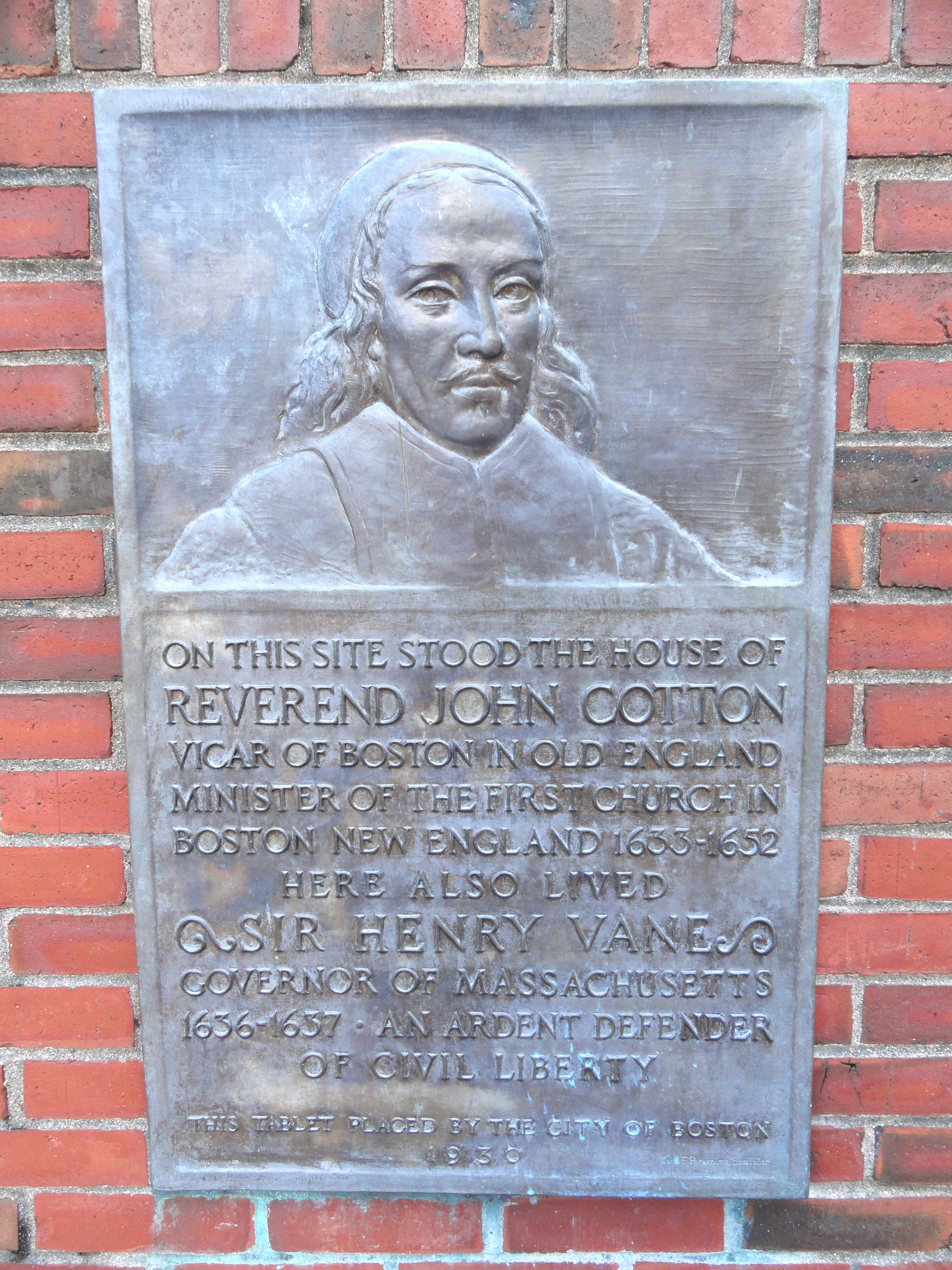
Plaque near the John Adams Courthouse in Boston, Massachusetts marking the site of Cotton's house

Cotton and Thomas Hooker were the first eminent ministers to come to New England, according to Cotton's biographer Larzer Ziff. Cotton was openly welcomed on his arrival in September 1633 as one of the two ministers of the church in Boston in the Massachusetts Bay Colony, having been personally invited to the colony by Governor Winthrop. Ziff writes, "It was only fitting, the majority felt, that the most eminent preacher in the colony should be located in the principal city." Also, many who had come from Boston, Lincolnshire had settled in Boston, Massachusetts.

The Boston meetinghouse of the 1630s was small and windowless, with clay walls and a thatched roof—far different from Cotton's former surroundings in the spacious and comfortable church of St. Botolph's. Once established in his new church, however, his evangelical fervor contributed to a religious revival, and there were more conversions during his first six months in the pastorate than there had been the previous year. He was recognized as the leading intellectual in the colony and is the first minister known to have preached a theme of millennialism in New England. He also became the spokesman for the new church polity known as Congregationalism.

Congregationalists felt very strongly that individual congregations were real churches, while the Church of England had strayed far from the teachings of the Bible. Puritan leader John Winthrop arrived in Salem with the Winthrop Fleet in 1630, but minister Samuel Skelton informed him that they would not be welcomed at the celebration of the Lord's supper and their children would not be baptized in Skelton's church because of Winthrop's association with the Church of England.

Cotton was initially offended by this action and was concerned that the Puritans in Salem had become separatists, as were the Pilgrims. However, Cotton eventually came to agree with Skelton and concluded that the only real churches were autonomous, individual congregations, and that there was no legitimate higher ecclesiastical power.

=== Relation with Roger Williams ===
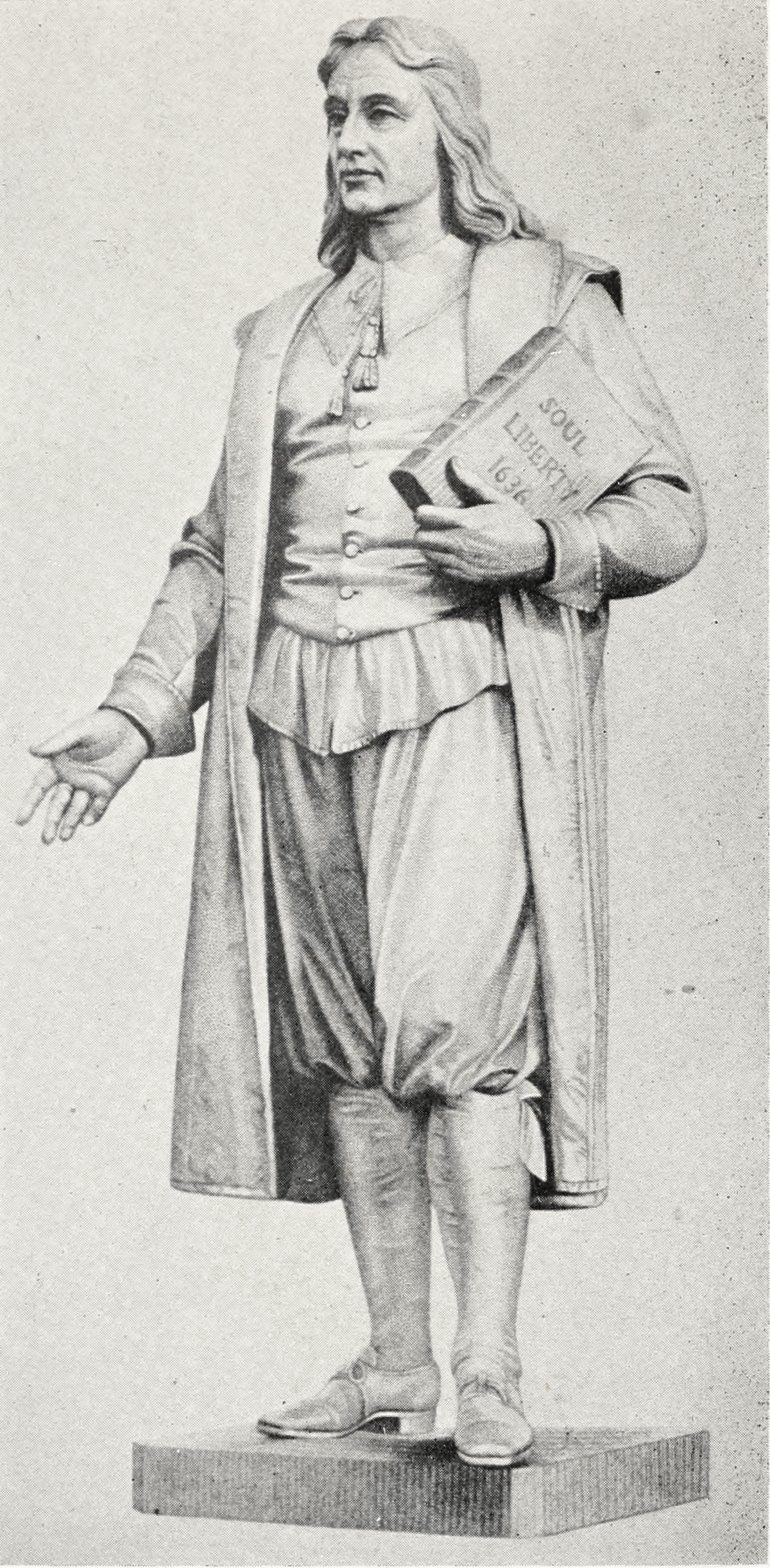
Roger Williams, with whom Cotton had serious theological debates

Early in his New England tenure, Roger Williams began to be noticed for his activity in the Salem Church. This church was founded in 1629 and had already become a separatist church by 1630, when it denied communion to John Winthrop and his wife upon their arrival in Massachusetts; it also refused to baptize a child born at sea. Williams arrived in Boston in May 1631 and was offered the position of teacher in the Boston church, but he refused the offer because the church was not sufficiently separated from the Church of England. He even refused to become a member of the Boston church, but he had been selected as the teacher at Salem by May 1631 upon the death of Francis Higginson.

Williams had a reputation for both non-conformity and piety, although historian Everett Emerson calls him a "gadfly whose admirable personal qualities were mixed with an uncomfortable iconoclasm". Boston's minister John Wilson returned to England to get his wife in 1632, and Williams again refused an invitation to fill in during his absence. Williams had distinctive theological views, and Cotton differed with him on the issues of separatism and religious toleration. Williams had gone to Plymouth for a short while but returned to Salem, and was called to replace Salem's minister Samuel Skelton upon his death.

During his tenure at Salem, Williams considered those who maintained ties with the Church of England to be "the unregenerate" and pushed for separation from them. He was supported by local magistrate John Endicott, who went so far as to remove the cross from the English flag as being a symbol of idolatry. As a result, Endicott was barred from the magistracy for a year in May 1635, and Salem's petition for additional land was refused by the Massachusetts Court two months later because Williams was the minister there.

Williams was soon banished from the Massachusetts colony; Cotton was not consulted on the issue but he nevertheless wrote to Williams, stating that the cause of banishment was "the tendency of Williams' doctrines to disturb the peace of the church and state." Williams was going to be shipped back to England by the Massachusetts magistrates, but instead he slipped away into the wilderness, spending the winter near Seekonk and establishing Providence Plantations near the Narragansett Bay the following spring. He eventually considered Cotton the "chief spokesman" for Massachusetts Bay Colony and "the source of his problems", according to one historian.

Cotton went to Salem in 1636 where he delivered a sermon to the congregation. His goal was to make peace with the parishioners, but also to persuade them of what he perceived as the dangers of the separatist doctrine espoused by Williams and many others.

=== Antinomian controversy ===
Cotton's theology espoused that a person is helpless to affect his own salvation, and instead is totally dependent on God's free grace. In contrast, most of the other New England ministers were "preparationists", espousing the view that morality and good works were needed to prepare one for God's salvation. Most members of Cotton's Boston church became very attracted to his theology, including Anne Hutchinson. She was a charismatic woman who hosted 60 or more people at her home each week to discuss Cotton's sermons, but also to criticize the colony's other ministers. Another highly important advocate of Cotton's theology was the colony's young governor Henry Vane, who had built an addition onto Cotton's house where he lived during his time in Boston. Hutchinson and Vane followed the teachings of Cotton, but both of them also held some views that were considered unorthodox, and even radical.

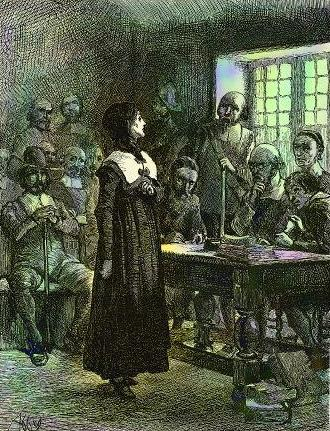
Anne Hutchinson, an admirer of Cotton and a key figure in the Antinomian Controversy

John Wheelwright, a brother-in-law of Hutchinson, arrived in New England in 1636; he was the only other divine in the colony who shared Cotton's free grace theology. Thomas Shepard was the minister of Newtown (which became Cambridge, Massachusetts). He began writing letters to Cotton as early as the spring of 1636, in which he expressed concern about Cotton's preaching and about some of the unorthodox opinions found among his Boston parishioners. Shepard also began criticizing this unorthodoxy to his Newtown congregation during his sermons.

Hutchinson and the other free grace advocates continually questioned, criticized, and challenged the orthodox ministers in the colony. Ministers and magistrates began sensing the religious unrest, and John Winthrop gave the first public warning of the ensuing crisis with an entry in his journal around 21 October 1636, blaming the developing situation on Hutchinson.

On 25 October 1636, seven ministers gathered at the home of Cotton to confront the developing discord, holding a private conference which included Hutchinson and other lay leaders from the Boston church. Some agreement was reached concerning the theological differences, and Cotton "gave satisfaction" to the other ministers, "so as he agreed with them all in the point of sanctification, and so did Mr. Wheelwright; so as they all did hold, that sanctification did help to evidence justification." The agreement was short-lived, and Cotton, Hutchinson, and their supporters were accused of a number of heresies, including antinomianism and familism. Antinomianism means "against or opposed to the law" and theologically means that a person considers himself not bound to obey any moral or spiritual law. Familism is named for a 16th-century sect called the Family of Love; it teaches that a person can attain a perfect union with God under the Holy Spirit, coupled with freedom from both sin and the responsibility for it. Hutchinson, Wheelwright, and Vane were antagonists of the orthodox party, but Cotton's theological differences from the colony's other ministers were at the center of the controversy.

By winter, the theological schism had become great enough that the General Court called for a day of fasting on 19 January 1637 to pray for a resolution of the colony's difficulties. Cotton preached a conciliatory sermon at the Boston church on that morning, but Wheelwright preached a sermon in the afternoon which was "censurable and incited mischief" in the view of the Puritan clergy. Cotton considered this sermon to be "ill-advised in manner, although ... valid enough in content."

==== Events of 1637 ====
By March, the political tide began to turn against the free grace advocates. Wheelwright was tried and convicted of contempt and sedition for his fast-day sermon, but he was not yet sentenced. John Winthrop replaced Henry Vane as governor in May 1637, and all of the other Boston magistrates who supported Hutchinson and Wheelwright were voted out of office. Wheelwright was sentenced to banishment at the court which convened on 2 November 1637 and ordered to leave the colony within 14 days.

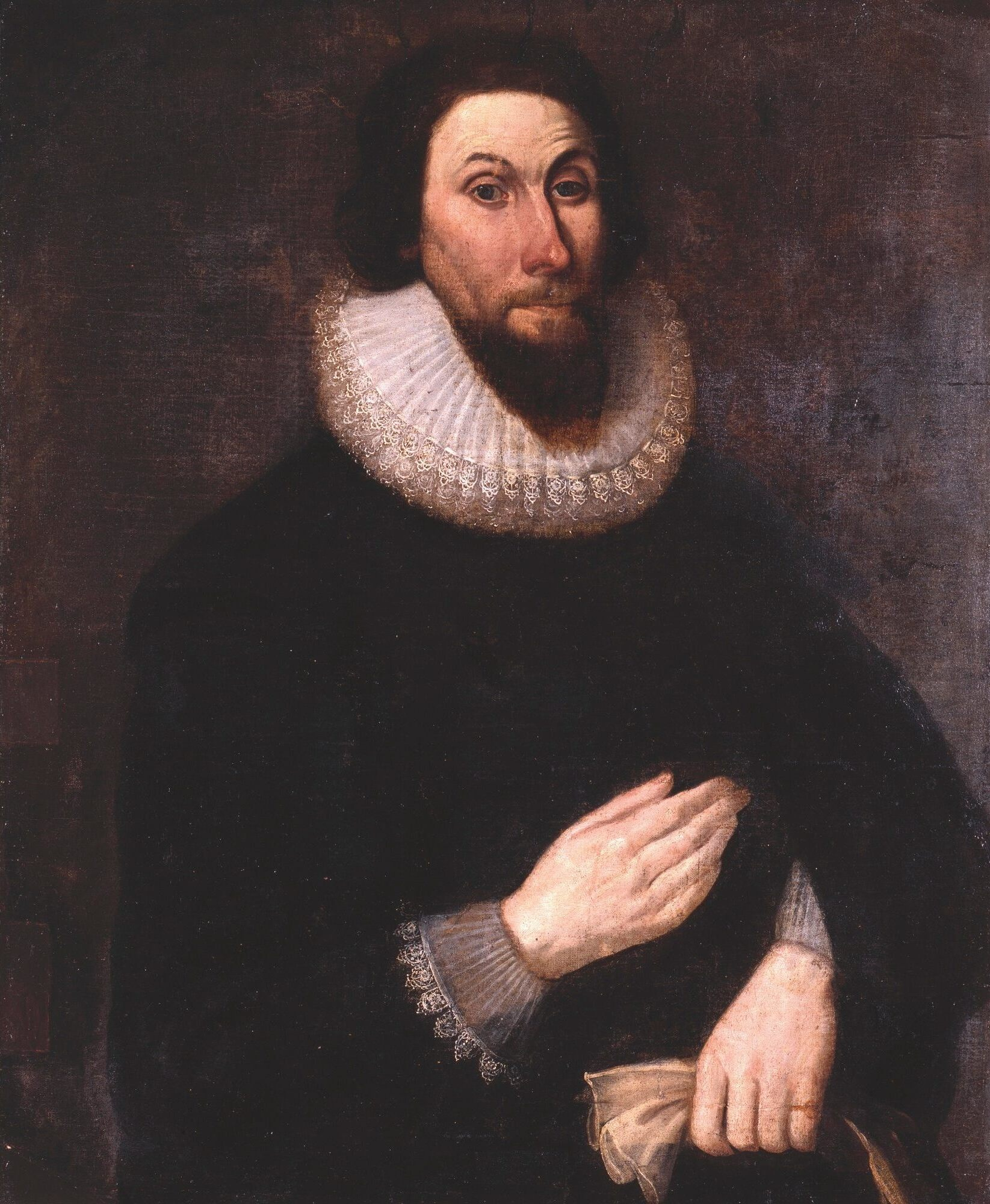
John Winthrop replaced Henry Vane as governor in May 1637.

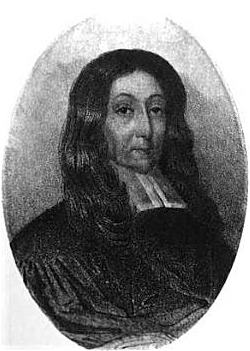
Reverend John Wilson, Cotton's fellow minister at the Boston church

Anne Hutchinson was brought before the clergy and congregation at the Boston meeting house on 15 March 1638. A list of numerous theological errors was presented, four of which were addressed during a nine-hour session. Then Cotton was put in the uncomfortable position of delivering an admonition to his admirer. He said, "I would speake it to Gods Glory [that] you have bine an Instrument of doing some good amongst us ... he hath given you a sharp apprehension, a ready utterance and abilitie to exprese yourselfe in the Cause of God."

With this said, it was the overwhelming conclusion of the ministers that Hutchinson's unsound beliefs outweighed any good that she might have done and that she endangered the spiritual welfare of the community. Cotton continued:

You cannot Evade the Argument ... that filthie Sinne of the Communitie of Woemen; and all promiscuous and filthie cominge togeather of men and Woemen without Distinction or Relation of Mariage, will necessarily follow ... Though I have not herd, nayther do I thinke you have bine unfaythfull to your Husband in his Marriage Covenant, yet that will follow upon it.

Here Cotton was making a reference to Hutchinson's theological ideas and those of the antinomians and familists, which taught that a Christian is under no obligation to obey moral strictures. He then concluded:

Therefor, I doe Admonish you, and alsoe charge you in the name of Ch[rist] Je[sus], in whose place I stand ... that you would sadly consider the just hand of God agaynst you, the great hurt you have done to the Churches, the great Dishonour you have brought to Je[sus] Ch[rist], and the Evell that you have done to many a poore soule.

Cotton had not yet given up on his parishioner, and Hutchinson was allowed to spend the week at his home, where the recently arrived Reverend John Davenport was also staying. All week the two ministers worked with her, and under their supervision she had written out a formal recantation of her unorthodox opinions. At the next meeting on Thursday, 22 March, she stood and read her recantation to the congregation, admitting that she had been wrong about many of her beliefs. The ministers, however, continued with her examination, during which she began to lie about her theological positions—and her entire defense unraveled. At this point, Cotton signaled that he had given up on her, and his fellow minister John Wilson read the order of excommunication.

==== Aftermath ====
Cotton had been deeply complicit in the controversy because his theological views differed from those of the other ministers in New England, and he suffered in attempting to remain supportive of Hutchinson while being conciliatory towards his fellow ministers. Nevertheless, some of his followers were taking his singular doctrine and carrying it well beyond Puritan orthodoxy. Cotton attempted to downplay the appearance of colonial discord when communicating with his brethren in England. A group of colonists made a return trip to England in February 1637, and Cotton asked them to report that the controversy was about magnifying the grace of God, one party focused on grace within man, the other on grace toward man, and that New England was still a good place for new colonists.

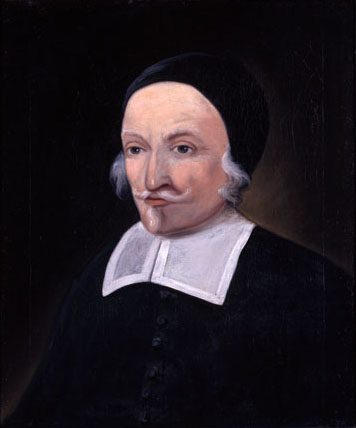
Cotton wrote several letters to Reverend John Wheelwright to help him get his banishment order lifted.

Cotton later summarized some of the events in his correspondence. In one letter he asserted that "the radical voices consciously sheltered themselves" behind his reputation. In a March 1638 letter to Samuel Stone at Hartford, he referred to Hutchinson and others as being those who "would have corrupted and destroyed Faith and Religion had not they bene timely discovered."

His most complete statement on the subject appeared in a long letter to Wheelwright in April 1640, in which he reviewed the failings which both of them had committed as the controversy developed. He discussed his own failure in not understanding the extent to which members of his congregation knowingly went beyond his religious views, specifically mentioning the heterodox opinions of William Aspinwall and John Coggeshall. He suggested Wheelwright should have picked up on the gist of what Hutchinson and Coggeshall were saying.

During the heat of the controversy, Cotton considered moving to New Haven, but he first recognized at the August 1637 synod that some of his parishioners were harboring unorthodox opinions, and that the other ministers may have been correct in their views about his followers. Some of the magistrates and church elders let him know in private that his departure from Boston would be most unwelcome, and he decided to stay in Boston once he saw a way to reconcile with his fellow ministers.

In the aftermath of the controversy, Cotton continued a dialogue with some of those who had gone to Aquidneck Island (called Rhode Island at the time). One of these correspondents was his friend from Lincolnshire William Coddington. Coddington wrote that he and his wife had heard that Cotton's preaching had changed dramatically since the controversy ended: "if we had not knowne what he had holden forth before we knew not how to understand him." Coddington then deflected Cotton's suggestions that he reform some of his own ideas and "errors in judgment". In 1640, the Boston church sent some messengers to Aquidneck, but they were poorly received. Young Francis Hutchinson, a son of Anne, attempted to withdraw his membership from the Boston church, but his request was denied by Cotton.

Cotton continued to be interested in helping Wheelwright get his order of banishment lifted. In the spring of 1640, he wrote to Wheelwright with details about how he should frame a letter to the General Court. Wheelwright was not yet ready to concede the level of fault that Cotton suggested, though, and another four years transpired before he could admit enough wrongdoing for the court to lift his banishment.

Some of Cotton's harshest critics during the controversy were able to reconcile with him following the event. A year after Hutchinson's excommunication, Thomas Dudley requested Cotton's assistance with counseling William Denison, a layman in the Roxbury church. In 1646, Thomas Shepard was working on his book about the Sabbath Theses Sabbaticae and he asked for Cotton's opinion.

== Late career ==
Coat of Arms of John Cotton

Cotton served as teacher and authority on scripture for both his parishioners and his fellow ministers. For example, he maintained a lengthy correspondence with Concord minister Peter Bulkley from 1635 to 1650. In his letters to Cotton, Bulkley requested help for doctrinal difficulties as well as for challenging situations emanating from his congregation. Plymouth minister John Reynes and his ruling elder William Brewster also sought Cotton's professional advice.

In addition, Cotton continued an extensive correspondence with ministers and laymen across the Atlantic, viewing this work as supporting Christian unity similar to what the Apostle Paul had done in biblical times.

Cotton's eminence in New England mirrored that which he enjoyed in Lincolnshire, though there were some notable differences between the two worlds. In Lincolnshire, he preached to capacity audiences in a large stone church, while in New England he preached to small groups in a small wood-framed church. He was able to travel extensively in England, and even visited his native town of Derby at least once a year. By contrast, he did little traveling in New England. He occasionally visited the congregations at Concord or Lynn, but more often he was visited by other ministers and laymen who came to his Thursday lectures. He continued to board and mentor young scholars, as he did in England, but there were far fewer in early New England.

=== Church polity ===
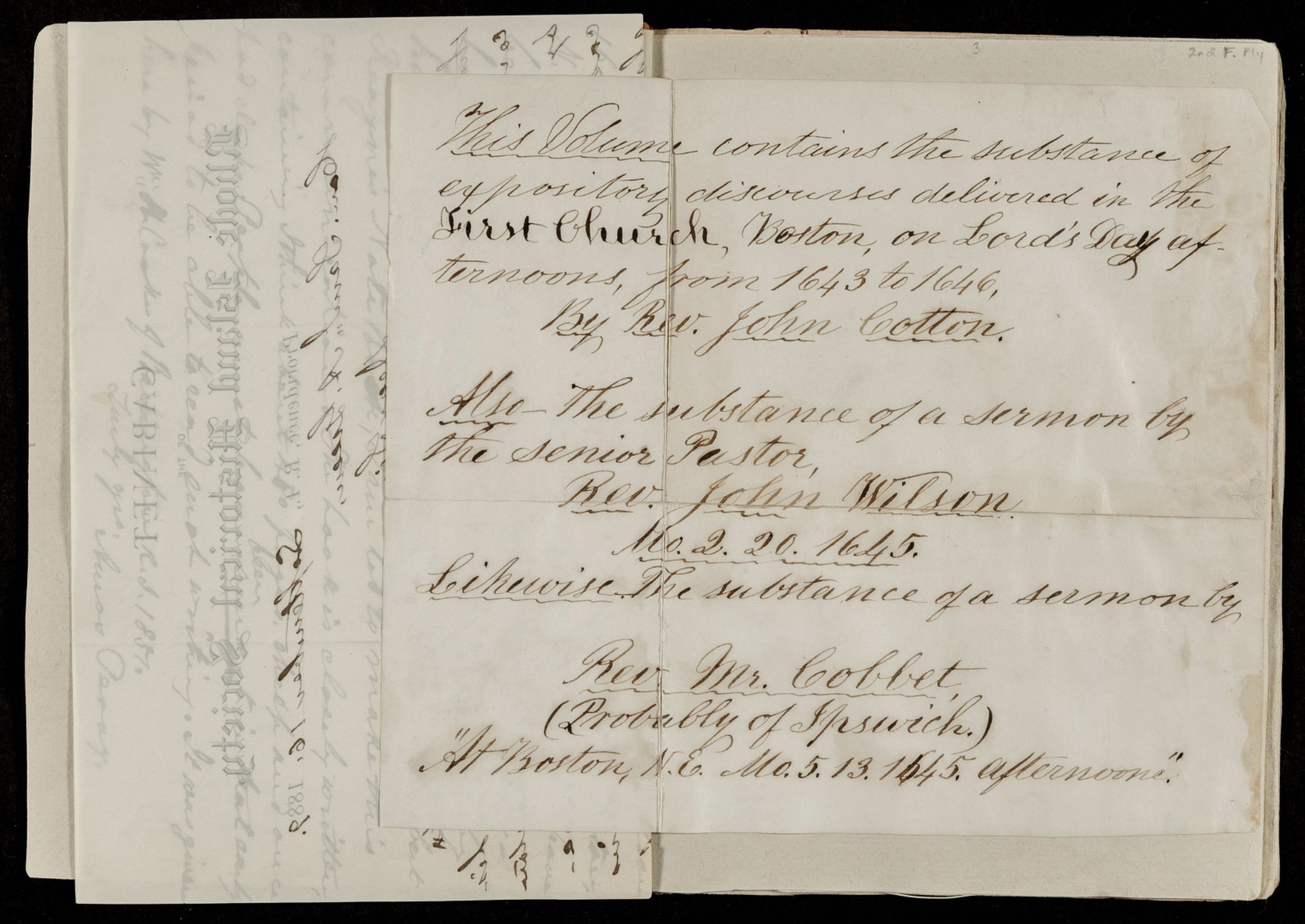
Notes taken by Robert Keayne regarding sermons delivered by Rev. John Cotton, Rev. John Wilson and Rev. Thomas Cobbet 1645-46 at First Church, Boston, Massachusetts Bay Colony

One of the major issues that consumed Cotton both before and after the Antinomian Controversy was the government, or polity, of the New England churches. By 1636, he had settled on the form of ecclesiastical organization that became "the way of the New England churches"; six years later, he gave it the name Congregationalism. Cotton's plan involved independent churches governed from within, as opposed to Presbyterianism with a more hierarchical polity, which had many supporters in England. Both systems were an effort to reform the Episcopal polity of the established Church of England.

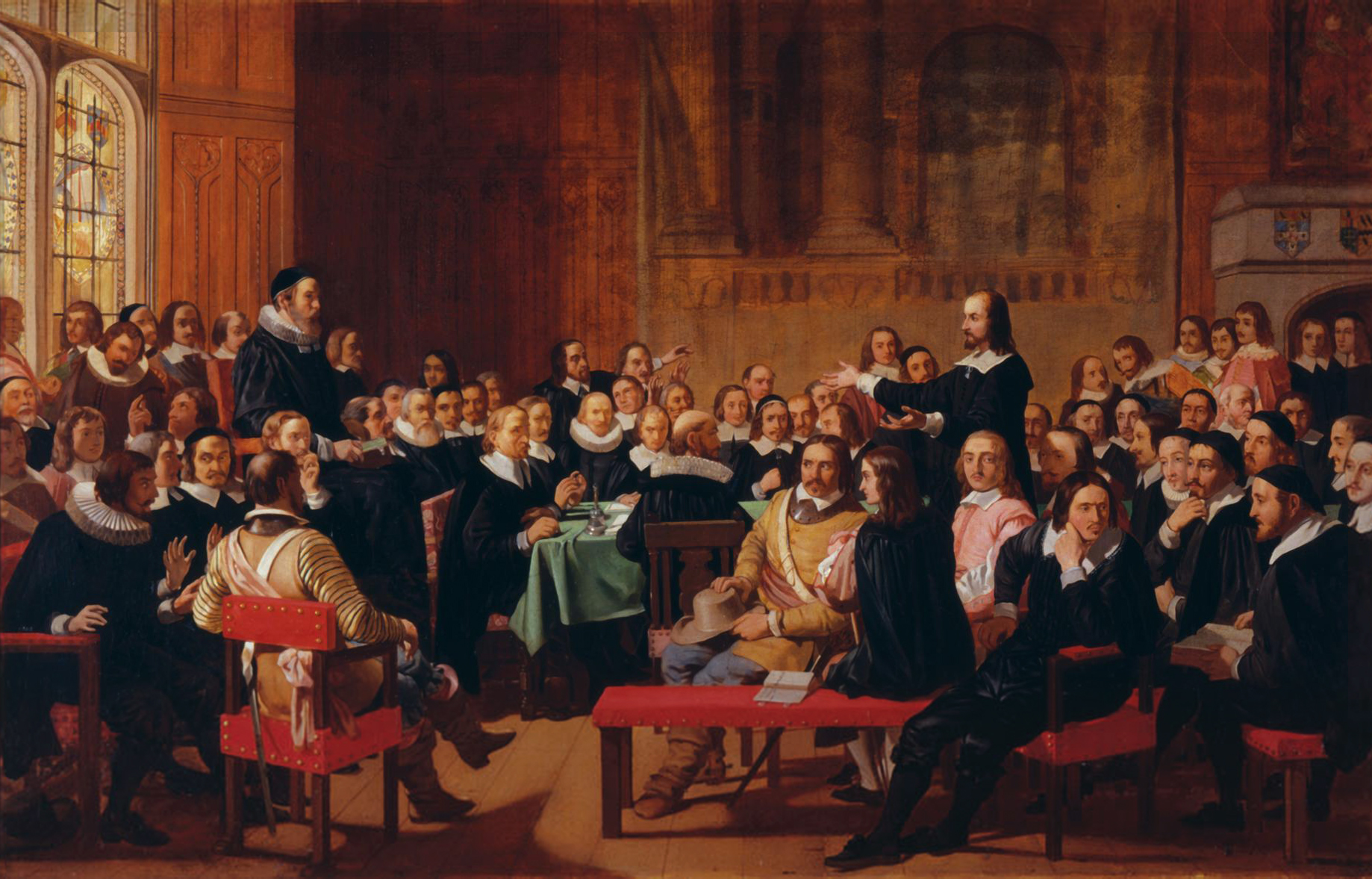
Cotton did not attend the Westminster Assembly, but he crafted much of the polity on Congregationalism presented there.

Congregationalism became known as the "New England Way", based on a membership limited to saved believers and a separation from all other churches in matters of government. Congregationalists wanted each church to have its own governance, but they generally opposed separation from the Church of England. The Puritans continued to view the Church of England as being the true church but needing reform from within.

Cotton became the "chief helmsman" for the Massachusetts Puritans in establishing congregationalism in New England, with his qualities of piety, learning, and mildness of temper. Several of his books and much of his correspondence dealt with church polity, and one of his key sermons on the subject was his Sermon Deliver'd at Salem in 1636, given in the church that was forced to expel Roger Williams. Cotton disagreed with Williams' separatist views, and he had hoped to convince him of his errors before his banishment. His sermon in Salem was designed to keep the Salem church from moving further towards separation from the English church. He felt the church and the state should be separate to a degree but that they should be intimately related. He considered the best organization for the state to be a Biblical model from the Old Testament. He did not see democracy as being an option for the Massachusetts government, but instead felt that a theocracy would be the best model. It was in these matters that Roger Williams strongly disagreed with Cotton.

Puritans gained control of the English Parliament in the early 1640s, and the issue of polity for the English church was of major importance to congregations throughout England and its colonies. To address this issue, the Westminster Assembly was convened in 1643. Viscount Saye and Sele had scrapped his plans to immigrate to New England, along with other members of Parliament. He wrote to Cotton, Hooker, and Davenport in New England, "urging them to return to England where they were needed as members of the Westminster Assembly". None of the three attended the meeting, where an overwhelming majority of members were Presbyterian and only a handful represented independent (congregational) interests. Despite the lopsided numbers, Cotton was interested in attending, though John Winthrop quoted Hooker as saying that he could not see the point of "travelling 3,000 miles to agree with three men." Cotton changed his mind about attending as events began to unfold leading to the First English Civil War, and he decided that he could have a greater effect on the Assembly through his writings.

The New England response to the assembly was Cotton's book The Keyes of the Kingdom of Heaven published in 1644. It was Cotton's attempt to persuade the assembly to adopt the Congregational way of church polity in England, endorsed by English ministers Thomas Goodwin and Philip Nye. In it, Cotton reveals some of his thoughts on state governance. "Democracy I do not conceive that ever God did ordain as a fit government either for church or commonwealth." Despite these views against democracy, congregationalism later became important in the democratization of the English colonies in North America. This work on church polity had no effect on the view of most Presbyterians, but it did change the stance of Presbyterian John Owen who later became a leader of the independent party at the Restoration of the English monarchy in 1660. Owen had earlier been selected to be the vice-chancellor of Oxford by Oliver Cromwell.

Congregationalism was New England's established church polity, but it did have its detractors among the Puritans, including Baptists, Seekers, Familists, and other sectaries. John Winthrop's Short Story about the Antinomian Controversy was published in 1644, and it prompted Presbyterian spokesman Robert Baillie to publish A Dissuasive against the Errours of the Time in 1645. As a Presbyterian minister, Baillie was critical of Congregationalism and targeted Cotton in his writings. He considered congregationalism to be "unscriptural and unworkable," and thought Cotton's opinions and conduct to be "shaky."

Cotton's response to Baillie was The Way of Congregational Churches Cleared published in 1648. This work brings out more personal views of Cotton, particularly in regards to the Antinomian Controversy. He concedes that neither Congregationalism nor Presbyterianism would become dominant in the domain of the other, but he looks at both forms of church polity as being important in countering the heretics. The brief second part of this work was an answer to criticism by Presbyterian ministers Samuel Rutherford and Daniel Cowdrey. Baillie made a further response to this work in conjunction with Rutherford, and to this Cotton made his final refutation in 1650 in his work Of the Holinesse of Church-members.

=== Synod and Cambridge Assembly ===
Following the Westminster Assembly in England, the New England ministers held a meeting of their own at Harvard College in Cambridge, addressing the issue of Presbyterianism in the New England colonies. Cotton and Hooker acted as moderators. A synod was held in Cambridge three years later in September 1646 to prepare "a model of church government". The three ministers appointed to conduct the business were Cotton, Richard Mather, and Ralph Partridge. This resulted in a statement called the Cambridge Platform which drew heavily from the writings of Cotton and Mather. This platform was adopted by most of the churches in New England and endorsed by the Massachusetts General Court in 1648; it also provided an official statement of the Congregationalist method of church polity known as the "New England Way".

=== Debate with Roger Williams ===
Cotton had written a letter to Roger Williams immediately following his banishment in 1635 which appeared in print in London in 1643. Williams denied any connection with its publication, although he happened to be in England at the time getting a patent for the Colony of Rhode Island. The letter was published in 1644 as Mr. Cottons Letters Lately Printed, Examined and Answered. The same year, Williams also published The Bloudy Tenent of Persecution. In these works, he discussed the purity of New England churches, the justice of his banishment, and "the propriety of the Massachusetts policy of religious intolerance." Williams felt that the root cause of conflict was the colony's relationship of church and state.

With this, Cotton became embattled with two different extremes. At one end were the Presbyterians who wanted more openness to church membership, while Williams thought that the church should completely separate from any church hierarchy and only allow membership to those who separated from the Anglican church. Cotton chose a middle ground between the two extremes. He felt that church members should "hate what separates them from Christ, [and] not denounce those Christians who have not yet rejected all impure practices." Cotton further felt that the policies of Williams were "too demanding upon the Christian". In this regard, historian Everett Emerson suggests that "Cotton's God is far more generous and forgiving than Williams's".

Cotton and Williams both accepted the Bible as the basis for their theological understandings, although Williams saw a marked distinction between the Old Testament and New Testament, in contrast to Cotton's perception that the two books formed a continuum. Cotton viewed the Old Testament as providing a model for Christian governance, and envisioned a society where church and state worked together cooperatively. Williams, in contrast, believed that God had dissolved the union between the Old and New Testaments with the arrival of Christ; in fact, this dissolution was "one of His purposes in sending Christ into the world." The debate between the two men continued in 1647 when Cotton replied to Williams's book with The Bloudy Tenant, Washed and Made White in the Bloud of the Lambe, after which Williams responded with yet another pamphlet.

=== Dealing with sectaries ===
A variety of religious sects emerged during the first few decades of American colonization, some of which were considered radical by many orthodox Puritans. (Note: The Separatists were not a sect, but a sub-division within the Puritan church. Their chief difference of opinion was their view that the church should separate from the Church of England. The Separatists included the Mayflower Pilgrims and Roger Williams.) Some of these groups included the Radical Spiritists (Antinomians and Familists), Anabaptists (General and Particular Baptists), and Quakers. Many of these had been expelled from Massachusetts and found a haven in Portsmouth, Newport, or Providence Plantation.

Sir Richard Saltonstall rebuked Cotton and other ministers for their persecutions of those not in the mainstream of Puritan orthodoxy.

One of the most notorious of these sectaries was the zealous Samuel Gorton who had been expelled from both Plymouth Colony and the settlement at Portsmouth, and then was refused freemanship in Providence Plantation. In 1642, he settled in what became Warwick, but the following year he was arrested with some followers and brought to Boston for dubious legal reasons. Here he was forced to attend a Cotton sermon in October 1643 which he confuted. Further attempts at correcting his religious opinions were in vain. Cotton was willing to have Gorton put to death in order to "preserve New England's good name in England," where he felt that such theological views were greatly detrimental to Congregationalism. In the Massachusetts General Court, the magistrates sought the death penalty, but the deputies were more sympathetic to free expression; they refused to agree, and the men were eventually released.

Cotton became more conservative with age, and he tended to side more with the "legalists" when it came to religious opinion. He was dismayed when the success of Parliament in England opened the floodgates of religious opinion. In his view, new arrivals from England as well as visitors from Rhode Island were bringing with them "horrifyingly erroneous opinions".

In July 1651, the Massachusetts Bay Colony was visited by three Rhode Islanders who had become Baptists: John Clarke, Obadiah Holmes, and John Crandall. Massachusetts reacted harshly against the visit, imprisoning the three men, while Cotton preached "against the heinousness" of the Anabaptist opinions of these men. The three men were given exorbitant fines, despite public opinion against punishment. Friends paid the fines for Clarke and Crandall, but Holmes refused to allow anyone to pay his fine. As a result, he was publicly whipped in such a cruel manner that he could only sleep on his elbows and knees for weeks afterwards. News of the persecutions reached England and met with a negative reaction. Sir Richard Saltonstall, a friend of Cotton's from Lincolnshire, wrote to Cotton and Wilson in 1652 rebuking them for the practices of the colony. He wrote, "It doth not a little grieve my spirit to heare what sadd things are reported dayly of your tyranny and persecutions in New-England as that you fyne, whip and imprison men for their consciences." He continued, "these rigid wayes have layed you very lowe in the hearts of the saynts." Roger Williams also wrote a treatise on these persecutions which was published after Cotton's death.

== Later life, death, and legacy ==
During the final decade of his life, Cotton continued his extensive correspondence with people ranging from obscure figures to those who were highly prominent, such as Oliver Cromwell with whom, in 1652, Cotton had "gently" corresponded regarding the wellbeing of a number of Puritan families arriving in Boston from "the sad field of Worcester, Cromwell's crowning mercy". Cotton's counsel was constantly requested, and Winthrop asked for his help in 1648 to rewrite the preface to the laws of New England. William Pynchon published a book that was considered unsound by the Massachusetts General Court, and copies were collected and burned on the Boston common. A letter from Cotton and four other elders attempted to moderate the harsh reaction of the court.

Religious fervor had been waning in the Massachusetts Bay Colony since the time of the first settlements, and church membership was dropping off. To counter this, minister Richard Mather suggested a means of allowing membership in the church without requiring a religious testimonial. Traditionally, parishioners had to make a confession of faith in order to have their children baptized and in order to participate in the sacrament of Holy Communion (Last Supper). In the face of declining church membership, Mather proposed the Half-way covenant, which was adopted. This policy allowed people to have their children baptized, even though they themselves did not offer a confession.

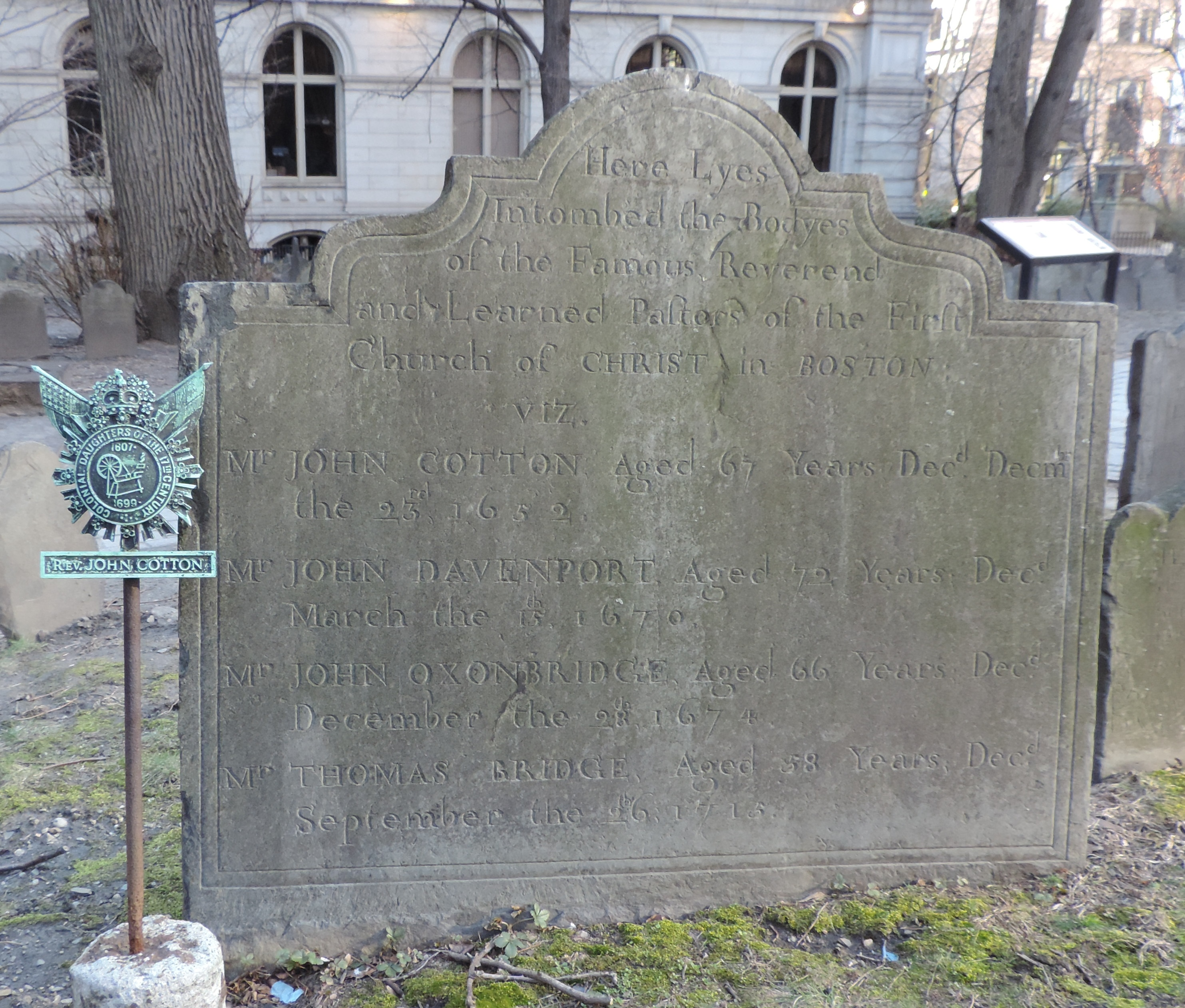
Cenotaph for Cotton and others in King's Chapel Burying Ground, Boston

Cotton was concerned with church polity until the end of his life and continued to write about the subject in his books and correspondence. His final published work concerning Congregationalism was Certain Queries Tending to Accommodation, and Communion of Presbyterian & Congregational Churches completed in 1652. It is evident in this work that he had become more liberal towards Presbyterian church polity. He was, nevertheless, unhappy with the direction taken in England. Author Everett Emerson writes that "the course of English history was a disappointment to him, for not only did the English reject his Congregational practices developed in America, but the advocates of Congregationalism in England adopted a policy of toleration, which Cotton abhorred."

Some time in the autumn of 1652, Cotton crossed the Charles River to preach to students at Harvard. He became ill from the exposure, and in November he and others realized that he was dying. He was at the time running a sermon series on First Timothy for his Boston congregation which he was able to finish, despite becoming bed-ridden in December. On 2 December 1652, Amos Richardson wrote to John Winthrop, Jr.: "Mr. Cotton is very ill and it is much feared will not escape this sickness to live. He hath great swellings in his legs and body". The Boston Vital Record gives his death date as 15 December; a multitude of other sources, likely correct, give the date as 23 December 1652.

=== Legacy ===
Many scholars, early and contemporary, consider Cotton to be the "preeminent minister and theologian of the Massachusetts Bay Colony." Fellow Boston Church minister John Wilson wrote: "Mr. Cotton preaches with such authority, demonstration, and life that, methinks, when he preaches out of any prophet or apostle I hear not him; I hear that very prophet and apostle. Yea, I hear the Lord Jesus Christ speaking in my heart." Wilson also called Cotton deliberate, careful, and in touch with the wisdom of God. Cotton's contemporary John Davenport founded the New Haven Colony and he considered Cotton's opinion to be law.

Cotton was highly regarded in England, as well. Biographer Larzer Ziff writes:

John Cotton, the majority of the English Puritans knew, was the American with the widest reputation for scholarship and pulpit ability; of all the American ministers, he had been consulted most frequently by the prominent Englishmen interested in Massachusetts; of all of the American ministers, he had been the one to supply England not only with descriptions of his practice, but with the theoretical base for it. John Cotton, the majority of the English Puritans concluded, was the prime mover in New England's ecclesiastical polity.

Even Thomas Edwards, an opponent of Cotton's in England, called him "the greatest divine" and the "prime man of them all in New England".

Around 1655, the Rev. Samuel Whiting (1597-1679) originally of Boston, Lincolnshire in England, wrote "Concerning the Life of the Famous Mr. Cotton, Teacher to the Church of Christ at Boston, in New-England". This work is found both in the Hutchinson Collection and in Alexander Young’s, Chronicles of the First Planters. Most scholars assume that Whiting’s work was used by the Rev. John Norton to author Abel Being Dead yet Speaketh in 1658.

Modern scholars agree that Cotton was the most eminent of New England's early ministers. Robert Charles Anderson comments in the Great Migration series: "John Cotton's reputation and influence were unequaled among New England ministers, with the possible exception of Thomas Hooker." Larzer Ziff writes that Cotton "was undeniably the greatest preacher in the first decades of New England history, and he was, for his contemporaries, a greater theologian than he was a polemicist." Ziff also considers him the greatest Biblical scholar and ecclesiastical theorist in New England. Historian Sargeant Bush notes that Cotton provided leadership both in England and America through his preaching, books, and his life as a nonconformist preacher, and that he became a leader in congregational autonomy, responsible for giving congregationalism its name. Literary scholar Everett Emerson calls Cotton a man of "mildness and profound piety" whose eminence was derived partly from his great learning.

Despite his position as a great New England minister, Cotton's place in American history has been eclipsed by his theological adversary Roger Williams. Emerson claims that "Cotton is probably best known in American intellectual history for his debate with Roger Williams over religious toleration," where Cotton is portrayed as "medieval" and Williams as "enlightened". Putting Cotton into the context of colonial America and its impact on modern society, Ziff writes, "An America in search of a past has gone to Roger Williams as a true parent and has remembered John Cotton chiefly as a monolithic foe of enlightenment."

== Family and descendants ==
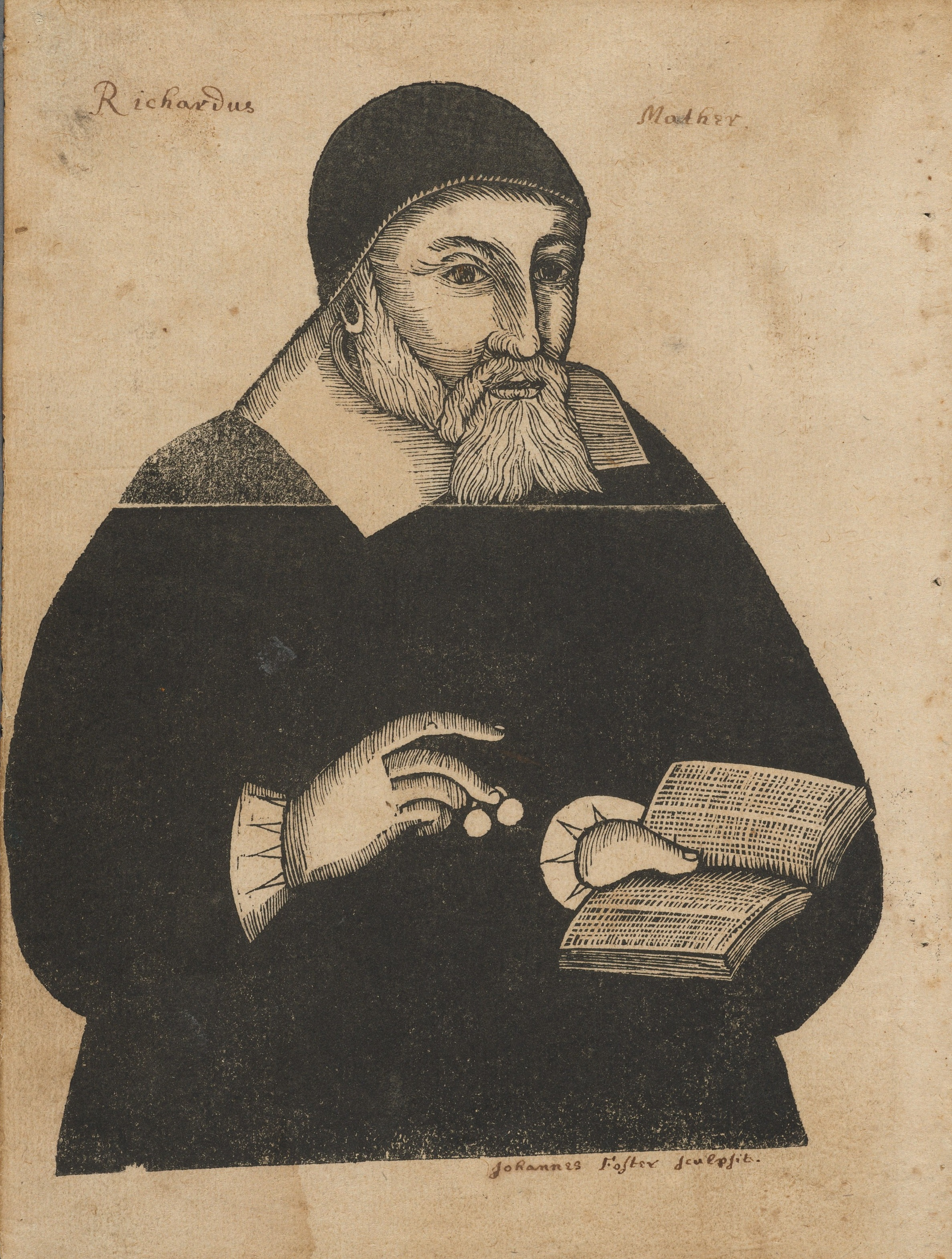
The Rev Richard Mather

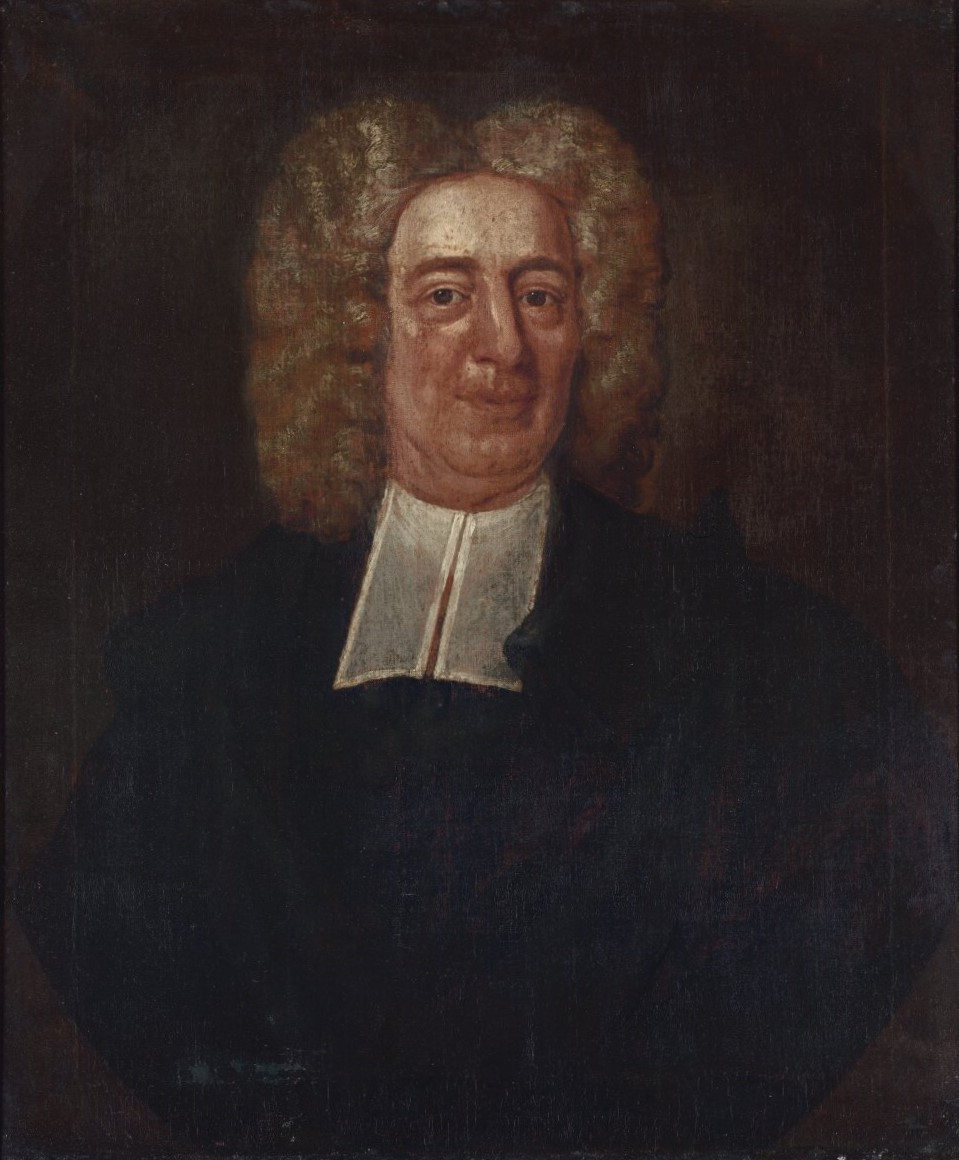
The minister and historian, Cotton Mather, was a grandson of Cotton, and named for him.

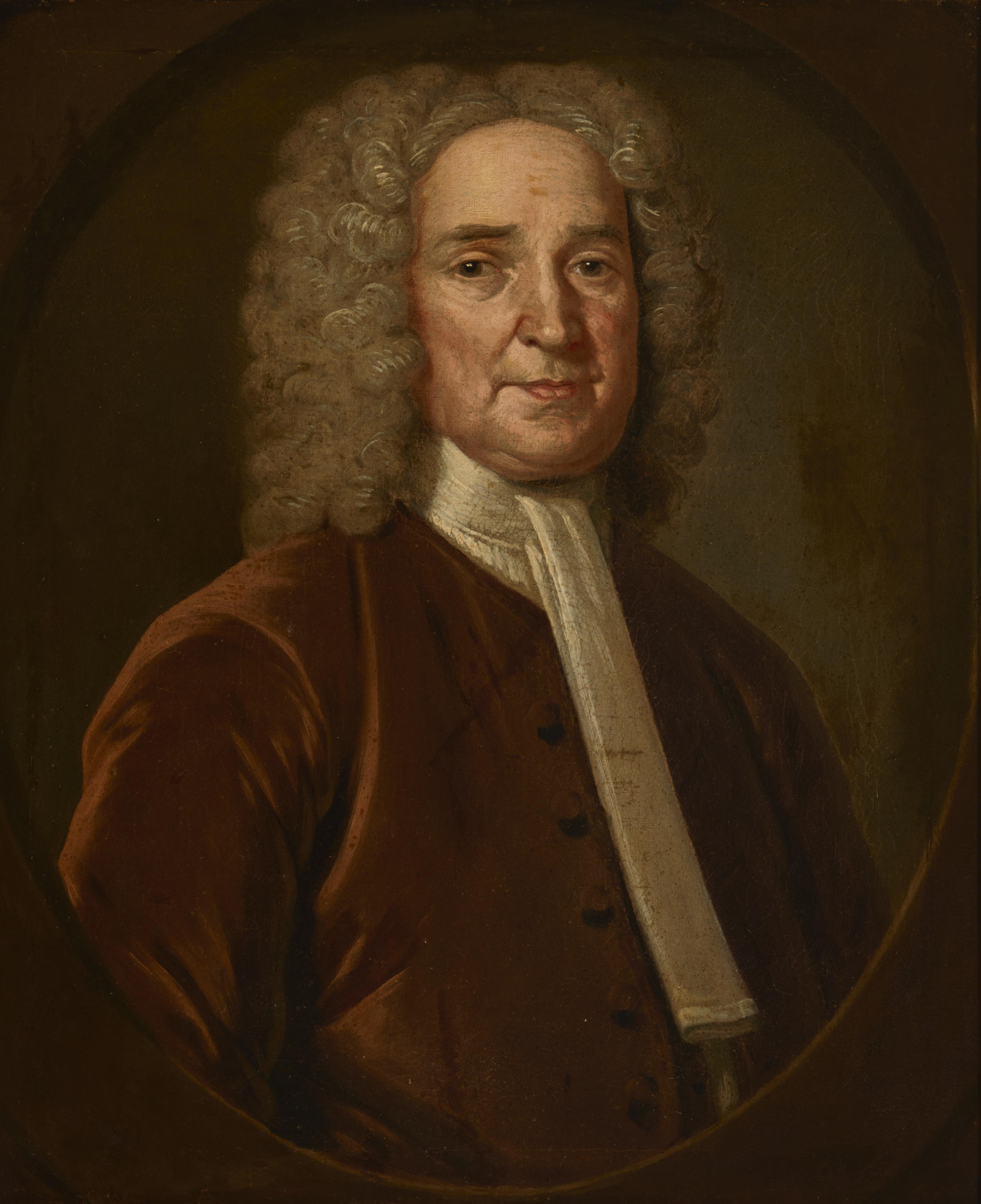
The Rev John Cotton 1690-1757 was a great-grandson of Cotton; resident of Newton Massachusetts

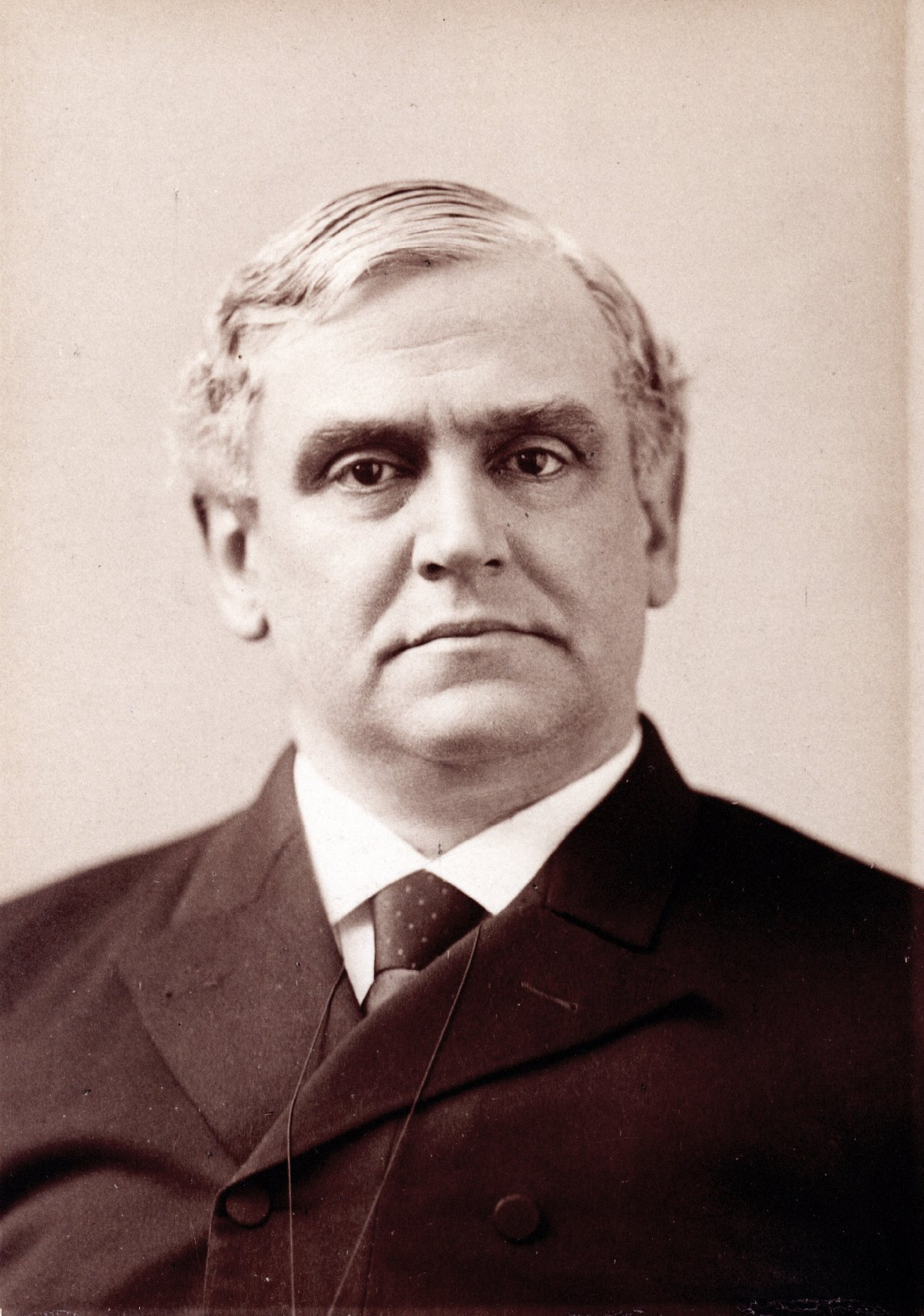
Clergyman Phillips Brooks

Cotton was married in Balsham, Cambridgeshire, on 3 July 1613 to Elizabeth Horrocks, but this marriage produced no children. Elizabeth died about 1630. Cotton married Sarah, the daughter of Anthony Hawkred and widow of Roland Story, in Boston, Lincolnshire, on 25 April 1632, and they had six children. His oldest child Seaborn was born during the crossing of the Atlantic on 12 August 1633, and he married Dorothy, the daughter of Simon and Anne Bradstreet. Daughter Sariah was born in Boston (Massachusetts) on 12 September 1635 and died there in January 1650. Elizabeth was born 9 December 1637, and she married Jeremiah Eggington. John was born 15 March 1640; he attended Harvard and married Joanna Rossiter. Maria was born 16 February 1642 and married Increase Mather, the son of Richard Mather. The youngest child was Rowland, who was baptized in Boston on 24 December 1643 and died in January 1650 during a smallpox epidemic, like his older sister Sariah.

Following Cotton's death, his widow married the Reverend Richard Mather. Cotton's grandson, Cotton Mather who was named for him, became a noted minister and historian. Cotton's granddaughter Lumina Cotton was a botanist, writer and teacher who was the first woman to receive a doctorate in Botany from Ohio State University. Among Cotton's descendants are Rev Nathaniel Thayer; US Supreme Court Justice Oliver Wendell Holmes Jr., Attorney General Elliot Richardson, actor John Lithgow, and clergyman Phillips Brooks.

== Works ==
Cotton's written legacy includes a large body of correspondence, numerous sermons, a catechism, and a shorter catechism for children titled Spiritual Milk for Boston Babes. The last is considered the first children's book by an American; it was incorporated into The New England Primer around 1701 and remained a component of that work for over 150 years. This catechism was published in 1646 and went through nine printings in the 17th century. It is composed of a list of questions with answers. Cotton's grandson Cotton Mather wrote, "the children of New England are to this day most usually fed with [t]his excellent catechism". Among Cotton's most famous sermons is God's Promise to His Plantation (1630), preached to the colonists preparing to depart from England with John Winthrop's fleet.

In May 1636, Cotton was appointed to a committee to make a draft of laws that agreed with the Word of God and would serve as a constitution. Moses, his judicialls was written by the subject, but it was not adopted. The resulting legal code was titled An Abstract of the laws of New England as they are now established. This was only modestly used in Massachusetts, but the code became the basis for John Davenport's legal system in the New Haven Colony and also provided a model for the new settlement at Southampton, Long Island.

Cotton's most influential writings on church government were The Keyes of the Kingdom of Heaven and The Way of Congregational Churches Cleared, where he argues for Congregational polity instead of Presbyterian governance. He also carried on a pamphlet war with Roger Williams concerning separatism and liberty of conscience. Williams's The Bloudy Tenent of Persecution (1644) brought forth Cotton's reply The Bloudy Tenent washed and made white in the bloud of the Lamb, to which Williams responded with Bloudy Tenent Yet More Bloudy by Mr. Cotton's Endeavour to Wash it White in the Blood of the Lamb.

Cotton's Treatise of the Covenant of Grace was prepared posthumously from his sermons by Thomas Allen, formerly Teacher of Charlestown, and published in 1659. It was cited at length by Jonathan Mitchell in his 'Preface to the Christian Reader' in the Report of the Boston Synod of 1662. A general list of Cotton's works is given in the Bibliotheca Britannica.

== See also ==
- History of Boston
- History of Massachusetts
