= Samuel Skelton =

Colonial American pastor

- Born: before February 26, 1593; Lincolnshire, England
- Died: August 2, 1634 (aged at least 43); Salem, Massachusetts Bay Colony, English Empire
- Education: University of Cambridge (1611)
- Organization: First Church in Salem
- Spouse: Susanna Travis (married 1619–?)
- Parent: William

Samuel Skelton (1593 – August 2, 1634) was the first pastor of the first church of Salem, Massachusetts, which is the original Puritan church in North America.

== Biography ==
Coat of Arms of Samuel Skelton

On February 26, 1592/93, Skelton was baptized in Coningsby, Lincolnshire, England where his father, William was rector. He enrolled at Clare College, Cambridge, in 1608 and graduated from the University of Cambridge in 1611 and earned a master's degree there in 1615. He was curate of Sempringham, Lincolnshire, c. 1615-20 and probably later chaplain to the Earl of Lincoln. In 1619, he married Susanna Travis at Sempringham.

He was recruited by John Endecott, who had just been appointed as the governor of a new colony, the London Plantation in the Massachusetts Bay in New England. Endecott invited Skelton to come to America with him and serve as minister of the colony. Endecott already had a close relationship with Skelton and considered him as his spiritual father. At this time Reverend Francis Higginson was elected as the church's first teacher.

Skelton and his family arrived in Salem on June 23, 1629. Skelton had been ordained in England, and had served for many years as a priest of the established Church of England in Lincolnshire. The new church in Salem was organized as one of the established English churches, and continued in that capacity until January 1, 1630. At that point, use of the Book of Common Prayer was discontinued, and the church became the second independent Congregational church in New England. This change, along with the significant assistance of Skelton, made it possible for the Pilgrims and the Puritans to unite as one colony.

Congregationalists felt very strongly that only individual congregations were real churches. The Church of England, with all of its bishops, hierarchy and ecclesiastical courts, counted for nothing in the eyes of God, and had strayed far from the teachings of the Bible. The New England Congregationalists also felt that the parish churches in England were dens of unpunished sin, ungodliness and false government. When the Winthrop Fleet led by Puritan leader John Winthrop arrived in Salem, Massachusetts in 1630, Skelton informed them that although he considered them to be real Christians, Skelton's church only gave visitors' privileges to members of real churches (which their parish churches in England were not). So, they would not be welcomed at the celebration of the Lord's supper and their children would not be baptized in Skelton's church.

Prominent English minister John Cotton was initially offended by this action, and was concerned that the Puritans had become separatists, as were the Pilgrims. However, Cotton eventually came to agree with Skelton, and concluded that the only real churches were autonomous, individual congregations, and that there was no legitimate higher ecclesiastical power.

Colonial authorities granted Skelton 213 acres of land in Danversport for services rendered to the colony (the land was a peninsula which became known as Skelton Neck). Skelton was considered to be reserved "in his manners," but "his talents and attainments were respectable." He was "a man of gracious speech, full of faith, and furnished by the Lord with gifts from above."

Roger Williams came to America in 1631 and in April became an assistant to Rev. Skelton. After Skelton's death, Williams became minister but was banished from Massachusetts for questioning the power of the colonial government over the church. As a result, he left the colony and founded Rhode Island.

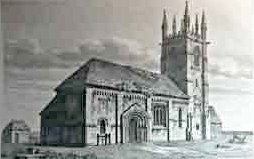
St Andrew's Church, Sempringham

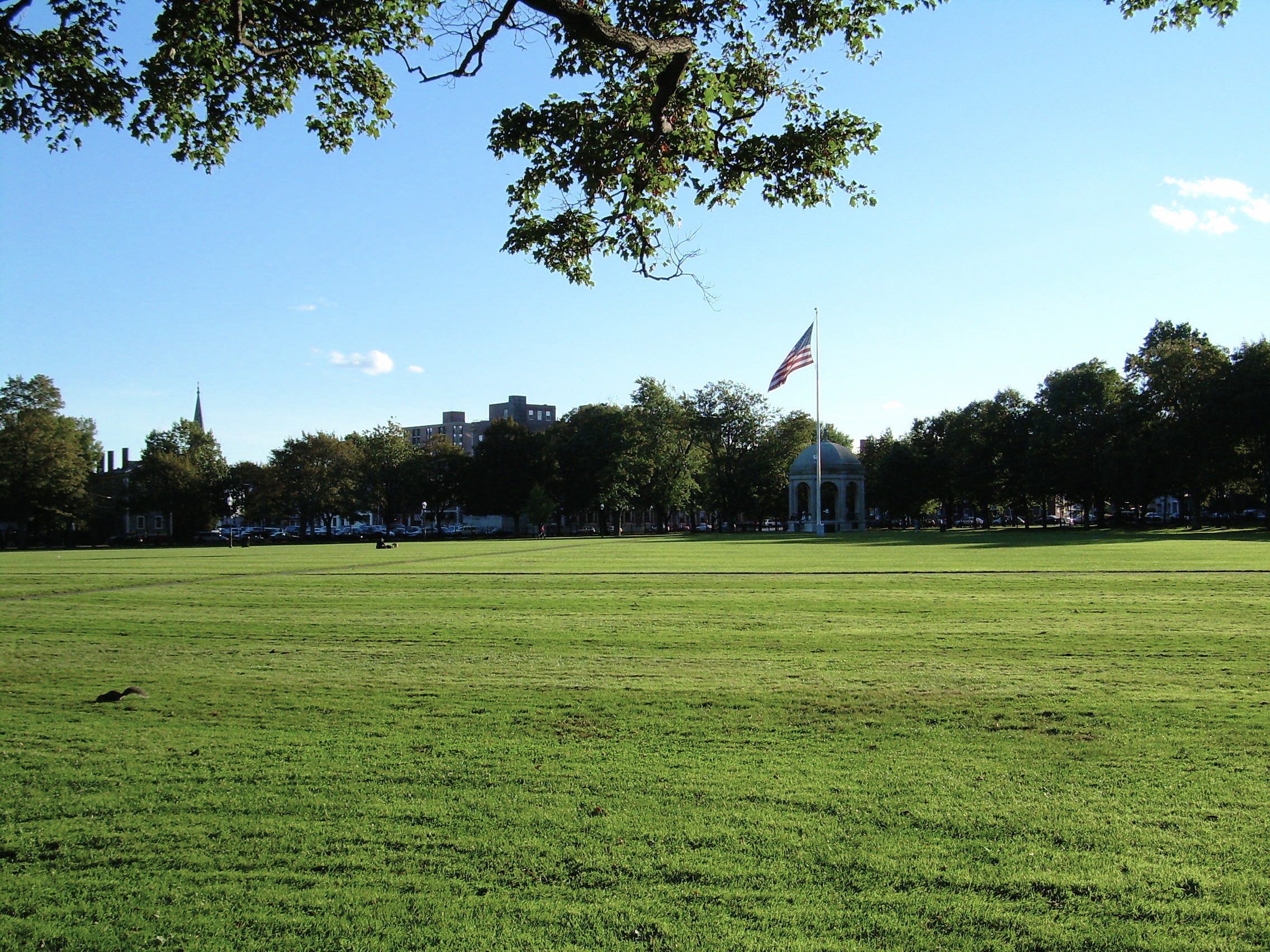
Salem Common in 2006

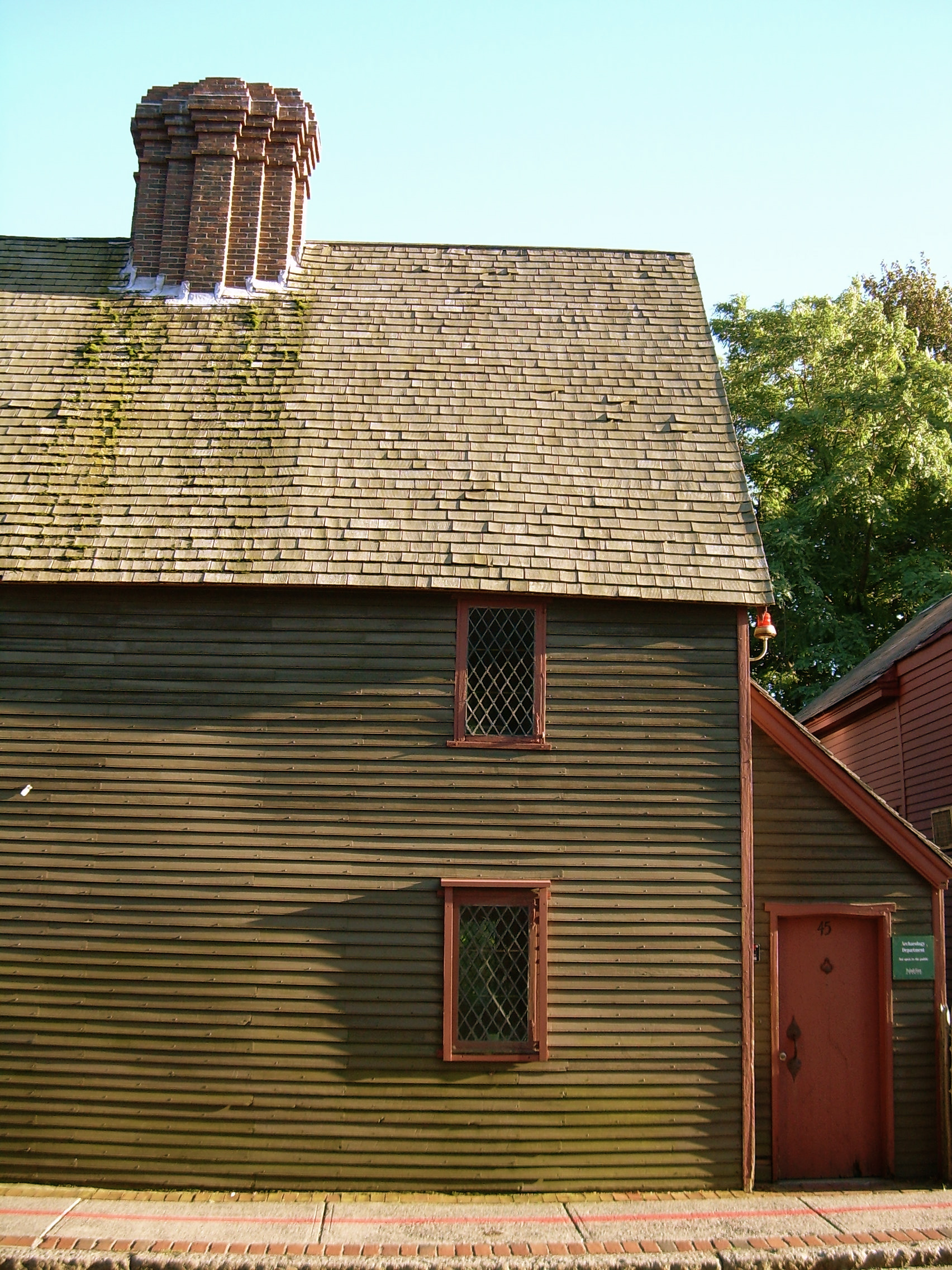
The Pickman House, c. 1664, located on Charter Street and believed to be Salem's oldest surviving building
