= List of justices of the Rhode Island Supreme Court =

This is a list of associate justices of the Rhode Island Supreme Court from 1747 to the present. The justices are listed under the term of the chief justice sitting at the time of their appointments (for a complete list of the chief justices, see List of chief justices of the Rhode Island Supreme Court).

== May 1747 – May 1749 Gideon Cornell ==
- Stephen Hopkins
- Joshua Babcock
- Josiah Arnold
- John Howland

== May 1749 – May 1751 Joshua Babcock ==
- Jonathan Randall (May 1749 – May 1761)
- William Hopkins (May 1749 – May 1750)
- William Hall (May 1749 – May 1750)
- John Walton (May 1749 – May 1751)
- William Richmond (May 1750 – May 1751)
- Benjamin Hazard (May 1750 – May 1751)

== May 1751 – May 1755 Stephen Hopkins ==
- Joseph Russell (May 1751 – May 1759; May 1761 – August 1763)
- Joseph Clarke (May 1751 – May 1761)

== May 1756 – May 1761 John Gardner ==
- Joseph Lippitt (May 1759 – May 1761)

== May 1761 – May 1762 Samuel Ward ==
- Thomas Wickham (May 1761 – May 1762)
- John Burton (May 1761 – May 1762)

== May 1762 – August 1763 John Gardner ==
- Nicholas Easton (May 1762 – August 1763)
- Samuel Nightingale (May 1762 – August 1763; June 1767 – June 1769)

== 1762 – 1764 Jeremiah Niles, Joseph Russell, Joshua Babcock, John Banister ==
- Thomas Cranston (August 1763 – May 1764)
- John Cole (August 1763 – May 1765; Chief Justice February 1764 – May 1765)
- Thomas Greene (August 1763 – May 1765 and June 1769 – June 1770)
- Silas Niles (August 1763 – May 1765)

== 1764 – 1765 John Cole ==
- Job Bennet Jr. (May 1764 – May 1768)
- Stephen Potter (May 1764 – May 1765; May 1767 – May 1768; and May 1778 – 1780)

== 1765 – 1767 Joseph Russell, James Helme ==
- William Hall (May 1749 – May 1750; May 1761 – August 1763; and May 1765 – June 1767)
- Job Bennet Jr. (May 1764 – May 1768)
- Gideon Comstock (May 1766 – June 1767; June 1769 – June 1770; and May 1779 – May 1781)
- Benoni Hall (May 1765 – May 1768, and June 1769 – May 1773)
- Henry Harris (May 1765 – May 1766)
- Metcalf Bowler (May 1768 – June 1769; June 1770 – February 1777)
- Nathaniel Searle (May 1768 – June 1770)

== 1770 – 1776 Stephen Hopkins, John Cooke ==
- James Helme (June 1767 – May 1768 and June 1769 – May 1774)
- William Greene (February 1777 – May 1778)
- Joseph Russell (May 1751 – August 1763; May 1765 – May 1767; May 1768 – June 1769; and May 1774 – August 1776)

== 1776 – 1777 Metcalf Bowler ==
- Shearjashub Bourn (August 1776 – May 1778)
- Jabez Bowen (August 1776 – May 1778)
- Thomas Wells (August 1776 – May 1780)

== 1777 – 1778 William Greene ==
- Perez Richmond

== 1778 – 1781 Shearjashub Bourn ==
- Paul Mumford
- Christopher Lippitt

== 1781 – 1781 Paul Mumford ==
- William Ellery (declined)
- Peter Phillips

== 1781 – 1785 Paul Mumford ==
- Thomas Tillinghast
- Pardon Gray
- Ambrose Page (declined)
- David Howell
- Jonathan Jenckes
- William West

== 1785 – 1786 William Ellery ==
- Thomas Arnold
- Joseph Hazard

== 1786 – 1788 Paul Mumford ==
- Gilbert Devol
- Walter Cooke

== 1788 – 1791 Othniel Gorton ==
- Simeon Clarke Jr.
- Daniel Owen
- Sylvester Robinson
- Ezekiel Gardner Jr.

== 1791 – 1795 Daniel Owen ==
- Carder Hazard
- William Taggart
- Joshua Bicknall

== 1795 – 1809 Peleg Arnold, Thomas Arnold ==
- Joseph Hoxsie
- George Brown
- Thomas Holden
- John Allen
- Joseph Reynolds
- Henry Remington
- William Marchant
- William Anthony
- Benjamin Johnson

== 1810 – 1812 Thomas Arnold, Peleg Arnold ==
- Jeffrey Hazard
- Joseph Cundall
- Charles Brayton
- Thomas Westcott

== 1819 – 1819 James Fenner ==
- Isaac Wilbour
- Daniel Champlin
- John DeWolf
- Thomas Buffum

== 1819 – 1827 Isaac Wilbour ==
- Dutee Arnold
- John DeWolf
- Luke Drury
- Wheeler Martin
- Samuel Randall
- Isaac Fiske
- Nathan Brown
- Samuel Eddy

== 1827 – 1835 Samuel Eddy ==
- Job Durfee
- Levi Haile
- William R. Staples
- George A. Brayton

== 1854 – 1856 William R. Staples ==
- Alfred Bosworth
- Sylvester G. Shearman

== 1856 – 1866 Samuel Ames ==
- J. Russell Bullock
- Thomas Durfee

== 1868 – 1875 George A. Brayton ==
- Walter S. Burgess
- Elisha R. Potter

== 1875 – 1891 Thomas Durfee ==
- Charles Matteson
- John H. Stiness
- Pardon E. Tillinghast
- George A. Wilbur

== 1891 – 1900 Charles Matteson ==
- Horatio Rogers Jr.
- William W. Douglas

== 1900 – 1903 John H. Stiness ==
- Benjamin M. Bosworth
- Edward C. Dubois
- John Taggard Blodgett

== 1904 – 1905 Pardon E. Tillinghast ==
- Clarke H. Johnson
- John Taggard Blodgett

== 1905 – 1908, William W. Douglas ==
- John Taggard Blodgett

== 1909 – 1913, Edward C. Dubois ==
- Christopher F. Parkhurst
- William H. Sweetland
- Darius Baker
- John Taggard Blodgett

== 1913 – 1917, Clarke H. Johnson ==
- Walter B. Vincent

== 1917 – 1920 Christopher F. Parkhurst ==
- Walter B. Vincent
- Charles F. Stearns

== 1920 – 1929 William A. Sweetland ==
- Walter B. Vincent
- Elmer J. Rathbun
- John W. Sweeney (1920–1935)
- Chester W. Barrows

== 1929 – 1935 Charles F. Stearns ==
- J. Jerome Hahn
- John S. Murdock

== 1935 – 1957 Edmund W. Flynn ==
- William W. Moss
- Antonio A. Capotosto (1935–1956)
- Hugh B. Baker (–1956)
- Francis Condon
- Jeremiah E. O'Connell (–1956)

== 1958 – 1965, Francis Condon ==
- Thomas H. Roberts (1956–1976)
- Harold A. Andrews

== 1966 – 1976 Thomas H. Roberts ==
- G. Frederick Frost
- William E. Powers
- Thomas J. Paolino
- Alfred H. Joslin
- John F. Doris
- Thomas F. Kelleher

== 1976 – 1986 Joseph A. Bevilacqua Sr. ==
- Joseph R. Weisberger
- Florence K. Murray
- Donald F. Shea

== 1993 – 2001 Joseph R. Weisberger ==
- Maureen McKenna Goldberg
- John P. Bourcier
- Robert Flanders
- Victoria Lederberg

== 2001 – 2008 Frank J. Williams ==
- Paul Suttell
- William P. Robinson III
- Francis X. Flaherty

== 2009 – present Paul Suttell ==
- Gilbert V. Indeglia
- Erin Lynch Prata (2021–)
- Melissa A. Long (2021–)

=== Bibliography ===
- Smith, Joseph Jencks (1900). Civil and Military List of Rhode Island, 1647–1800. Providence, RI: Preston and Rounds, Co. "Superior."
- The Supreme Court of Rhode Island (RI Supreme Court, 2010), pg. 23

== See also ==
- List of chief justices of the Rhode Island Supreme Court
- Rhode Island Supreme Court
