= List of chief justices of the Rhode Island Supreme Court =

The Rhode Island Supreme Court was created in 1747 and used the title of Superior Court of Judicature, Court of Assize, and General Gaol Delivery. When established, the court consisted of a Chief Justice and four Associate Justices (for a list of the Associate Justices, see List of the Justices of the Rhode Island Supreme Court) Following are the Chief Justices from 1747 to the present:

== Colonial ==
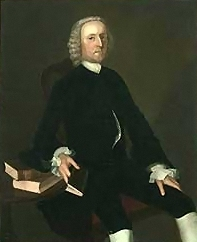
Joshua Babcock

- Gideon Cornell, May 1747 – January 1749
- Joshua Babcock, January 1749 – May 1751
- Stephen Hopkins, May 1751 – May 1755, Signer of the Declaration of Independence
- Francis Willet, May 1755 – August 1755
- Stephen Hopkins, August 1755 – May 1756
- John Gardner, May 1756 – May 1761
- Samuel Ward, May 1761 – May 1762
- Jeremiah Niles, May 1762 – June 1762
- Joseph Russell, June 1762 – August 1763
- Joshua Babcock, August 1763 – October 1763
- John Banister, October 1763 – February 1764
- John Cole, February 1764 – May 1765
- Joseph Russell, May 1765 – June 1767
- James Helme, June 1767 – May 1768
- Joseph Russell, May 1768 – June 1769
- James Helme, June 1769 – June 1770
- Stephen Hopkins, June 1770 – October 1775
- John Cooke, October 1775 – August 1776

== State ==
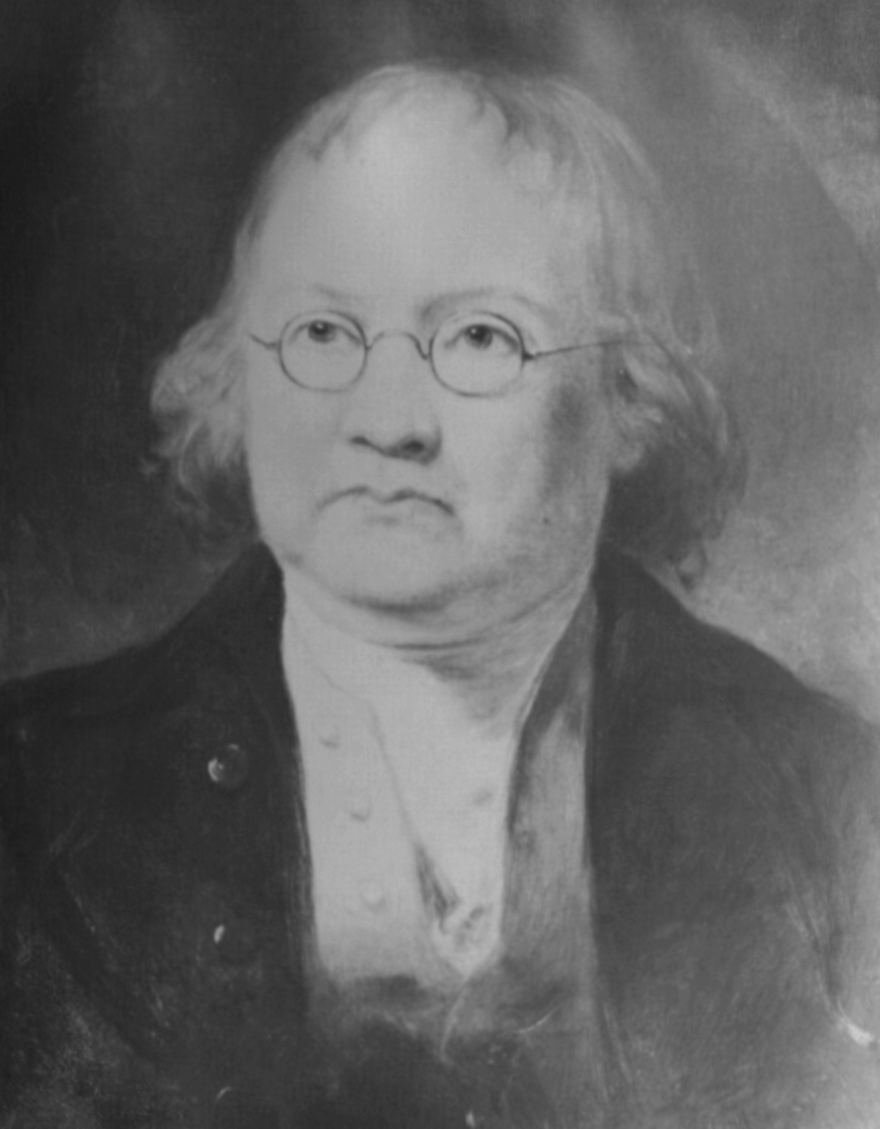
William Ellery

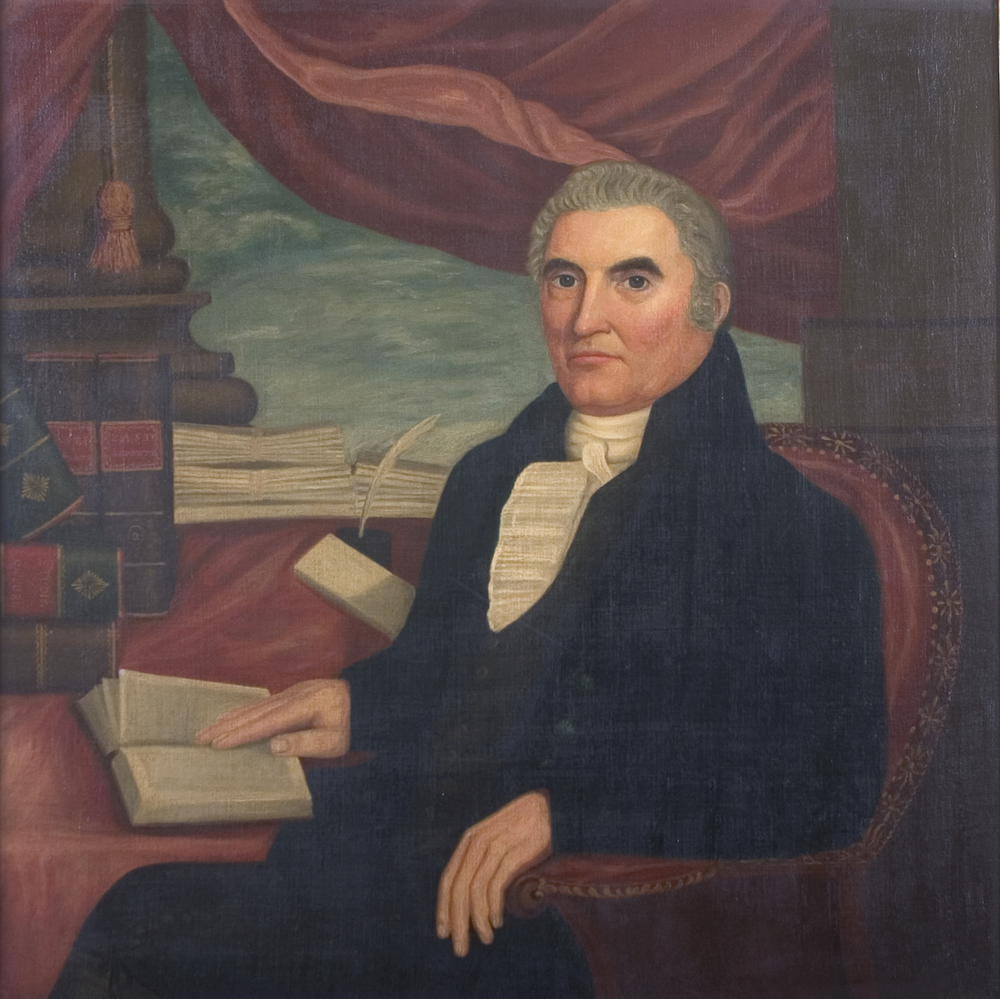
Peleg Arnold

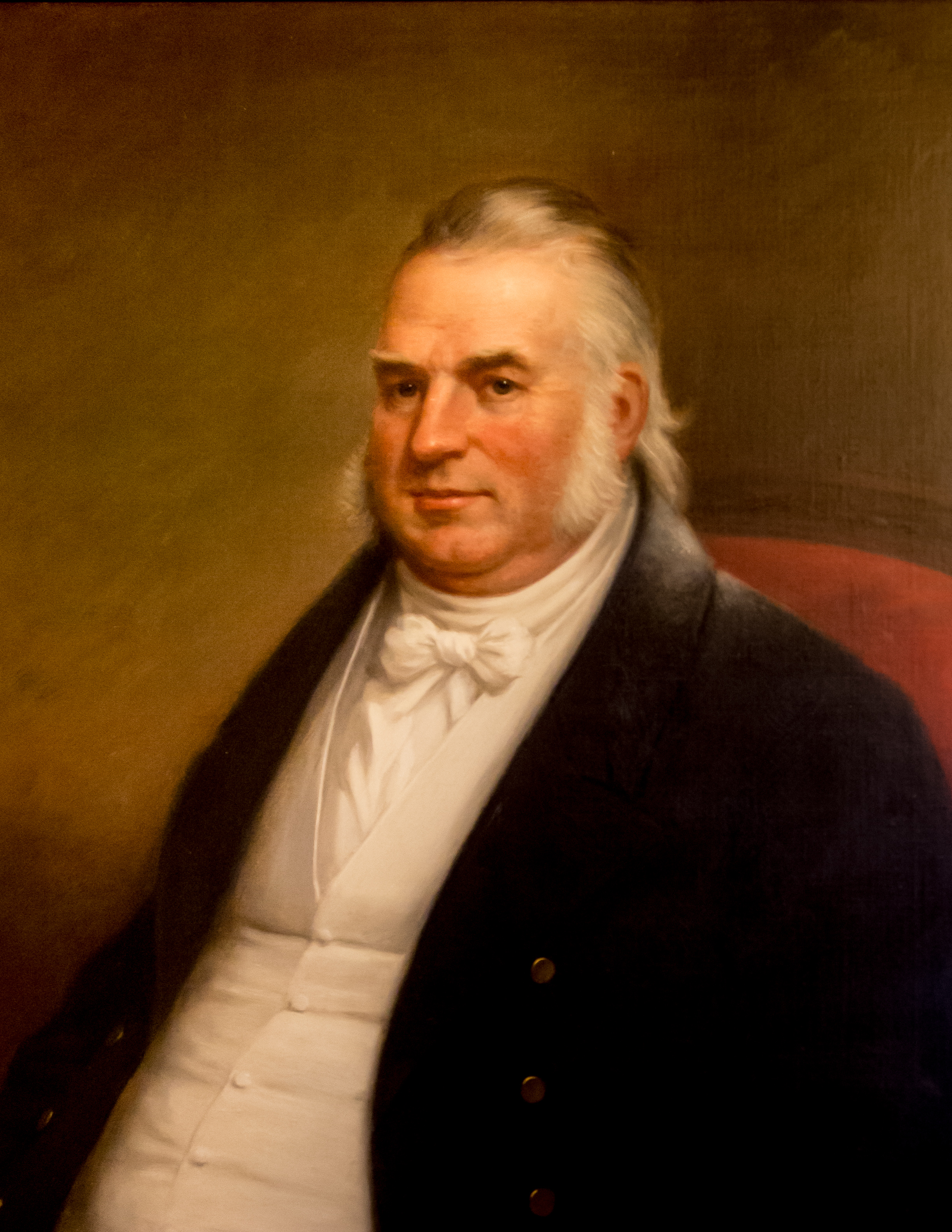
James Fenner

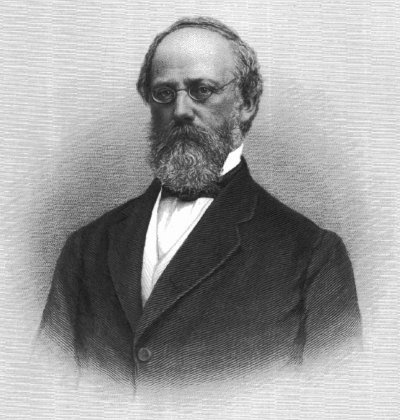
Charles S. Bradley

- Metcalf Bowler, August 1776 – February 1777
- William Greene, February 1777 – May 1778
- Shearjashub Bourn, May 1778 – May 1781
- Paul Mumford, May 1781 – June 1785
- William Ellery, June 1785 – May 1786, signer of Declaration of Independence
- Paul Mumford, May 1786 – June 1788
- Othniel Gorton, June 1788 – May 1791
- Daniel Owen, May 1791 – June 1795

In 1799, the name was changed to the Supreme Judicial Court:

- Peleg Arnold, June 1795 – June 1809
- Thomas Arnold, 1809 – 1810
- Peleg Arnold, 1810 – 1812
- Daniel Lyman, 1812 – 1816
- James Burrill, Jr., 1816 – 1817
- Tristam Burges, 1817 – 1818
- James Fenner, 1819 – 1819
- Isaac Wilbour, 1819 – 1827
- Samuel Eddy, 1827 – 1835
- Job Durfee, 1835 – 1843

In 1843, the name was changed to the Supreme Court:

- Job Durfee, 1843 – 1848
- Richard W. Green, 1848 – 1854
- William R. Staples, 1854 – 1856
- Samuel Ames, 1856 – 1866
- Charles S. Bradley, 1866 – 1868
- George A. Brayton, 1868 – 1875
- Thomas Durfee, 1875 – 1891
- Charles Matteson, 1891 – 1900
- John H. Stiness, 1900 – 1903
- Pardon E. Tillinghast, 1904 – 1905
- William W. Douglas, 1905 – 1908
- Edward C. Dubois, 1909 – 1913
- Clarke H. Johnson, 1913 – 1917
- Christopher F. Parkhurst, 1917 – 1920
- William A. Sweetland, 1920 – 1929
- Charles F. Stearns, 1929 – 1935
- Edmund W. Flynn, 1935 – 1957
- Francis B. Condon, 1958 – 1965
- Thomas H. Roberts, 1966 – 1976
- Joseph A. Bevilacqua, Sr., 1976 – 1986
- Thomas F. Fay, 1986 – 1993
- Joseph R. Weisberger, 1993 – 2001
- Frank J. Williams, 2001 – 2008
- Paul Suttell, 2009 – present

== See also ==
- List of the Justices of the Rhode Island Supreme Court
