= William H. Sweetland =

American judge (1856–1932)

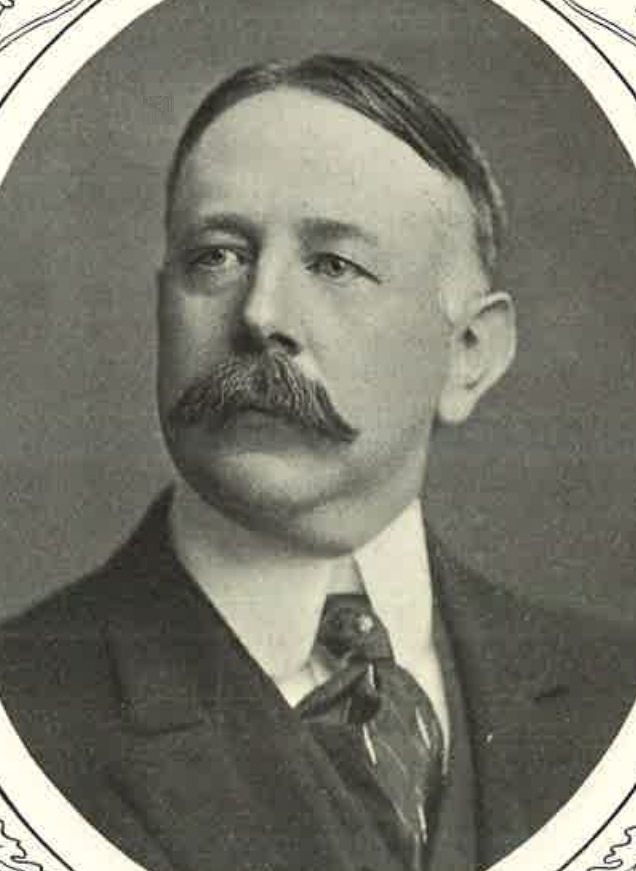
Judge William H. Sweetland

William Howard Sweetland (December 19, 1856 – January 18, 1932) was an associate justice of the Rhode Island Supreme Court from 1909 to 1920, and chief justice from 1920 to 1929.

Born in Pawtucket, Rhode Island, to William and Nancy Greene (Howard) Sweetland, he attended the public schools in Providence, and graduated from Brown University in 1878.

He gained admission to the bar in Providence, Rhode Island, and affiliated himself with the Republican Party. He served for times on the Rhode Island House of Representatives, on the school committee of Providence, and as a judge of the Sixth District Court. He was elected by the state legislature to a seat on the Rhode Island Supreme Court on January 19, 1909, and served until his retirement on April 5, 1929.

He married Florence G. Reynolds, with whom he had two children. Sweetland died from heart disease at his home in Providence at the age of 76.

Political offices
Preceded by William W. Douglas	Justice of the Rhode Island Supreme Court; 1909–1929	Succeeded by John S. Murdock
Preceded by Christopher F. Parkhurst	Chief Justice of the Rhode Island Supreme Court; 1920–1929	Succeeded by Charles F. Stearns
