= Samuel Nightingale =

American judge (1715–1786)

Samuel Nightingale (1715 – 1786) was a clergyman, distiller, merchant, and justice of the peace who served as a justice of the Colonial Rhode Island Supreme Court from May 1762 to August 1763, and again from June 1767 to June 1769.

Nightingale was the son of Joseph Nightingale (1677–1725). He was raised in Braintree, Massachusetts and graduated from Harvard College in 1734 after which he became clergyman. He lived in Pomfret, Connecticut for some years, and settled in Providence, Rhode Island in 1751. There he operated a distillery, invested in mercantile ventures, served as Justice of the Peace from 1752 to 1761, and then was chosen for three terms as associate justice of the state Supreme Court through 1768. Nightingale returned to Pomfret for much of the Revolution, from 1778 to 1781.

He married Abigail Belcher in 1740. Their seven surviving children were Samuel Jr. (1741–1814), Joseph (1747–1797), William, Sarah (1744–1830) (m. Thomas Munro), Abigail (1745–1825) (m. Sylvester Richmond), Mary or "Polly" (1754–1803) (m. James Gramont) and Lydia (1760–1823) (m. Abijah Warren). Samuel II became a prosperous merchant, and Joseph was even more successful as founder of the merchant partnership Clark & Nightingale." His son Samuel was the Treasurer of Providence from 1797 to 1814.

Political offices
Preceded by John Burton; William Hall	Justice of the Rhode Island Supreme Court; 1762–1763; 1767–1769	Succeeded by Thomas Greene; Gideon Comstock
