= Benoni Hall =

American judge (1710–1779)

Benoni Hall (1710–September 16, 1779) was a Rhode Island surveyor who served as a justice of the Colonial Rhode Island Supreme Court from May 1765 to May 1768, and again from June 1769 to May 1773.

In March 1732, he married Elizabeth Gardiner. When the town of Exeter, Rhode Island was established in March 1742, Hall was chosen as its first town clerk.

In July 1758, Rhode Island provincial records show that Hall had reported that his son Henry had been taken prisoner in French Louisiana, and that Hall sought to arrange a prisoner exchange to obtain the release of his son and other British subjects; this proposal was approved by the General Assembly.

Among the cases over which Hall presided while serving on the Supreme Court was that of David Hill of Wrentham, a merchant whose property had been seized in New York, and who sued those responsible against their own property in Rhode Island. Hill's cause was unpopular, but in 1771 the court of appeals and the supreme court both upheld an award for Hill, and members of the supreme court, including Hall, were nonetheless reelected by the legislature the following term.

Political offices
Preceded by Silas Niles; Metcalf Bowler	Justice of the Rhode Island Supreme Court; 1765–1768; 1769–1773	Succeeded by Metcalf Bowler; Job Bennet Jr.
