= Justice Bosworth =

Justice Bosworth may refer to:

- Alfred Bosworth (1812–1862), associate justice of the Rhode Island Supreme Court
- Benjamin M. Bosworth (1848–1899), associate justice of the Rhode Island Supreme Court
