= George Wilbur =

George Wilbur may refer to:

- George A. Wilbur (1832–1906), justice of the Rhode Island Supreme Court
- George P. Wilbur (1941–2023), American actor
