= William W. Moss =

American judge (1872–1949)

William W. Moss (1872 – December 17, 1949) was a justice of the Rhode Island Supreme Court from January 1935 to January 1948.

Born in Stonington, Connecticut, Moss received his undergraduate degree from Brown University in 1891 and his law degree from Harvard Law School in 1898. He gained admission to the bar in Rhode Island and Missouri, and practiced in Kansas City, Missouri, until 1902, when he returned to New England. He settled in Providence, Rhode Island, where was involved in various civic organizations, becoming an assistant attorney general from 1933 to 1935. In that capacity, Moss assisted Governor Theodore F. Green in writing an emergency relief bill in 1933 to address the high unemployment rates brought by the Great Depression. In January 1935, the Democratic Party unexpectedly gained control of the Rhode Island Senate, installing an entirely new five-member court, to which Moss was named as an associate justice. Moss retired from the court in January 1948, due to poor health; the Rhode Island General Assembly passed a measure to provide him with a pension in retirement.

Moss died in his home in Providence at the age of 77, following a brief illness.

Political offices
Preceded by Newly reconstituted court	Justice of the Rhode Island Supreme Court; 1935–1948	Succeeded by Jeremiah E. O'Connell
