= Samuel Eddy =

American judge

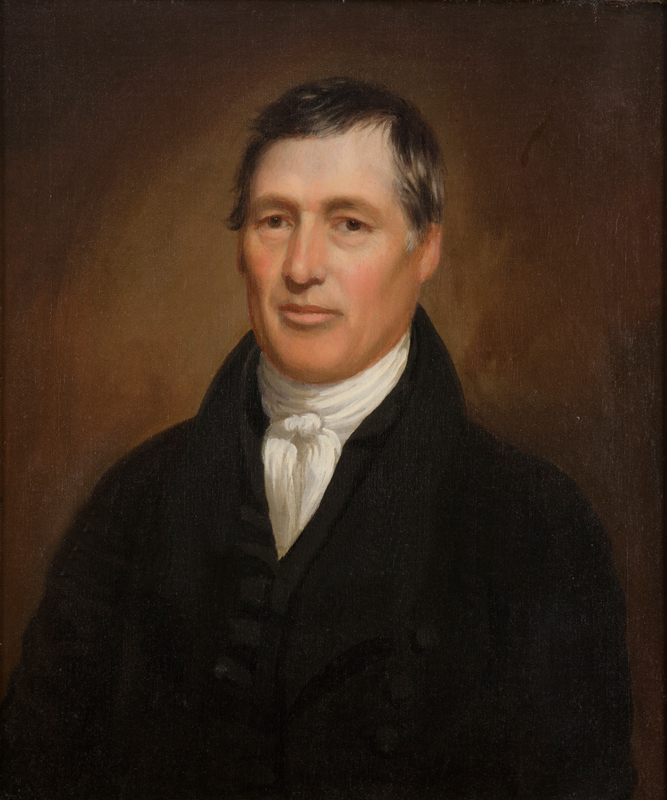

35th Chief Justice of the Rhode Island Supreme Court
- In office 1827–1835
- Preceded by: Isaac Wilbour
- Succeeded by: Job Durfee

Member of the U.S. House of Representatives from Rhode Island's at-large district
- In office March 4, 1819 – March 3, 1825
- Preceded by: John Linscom Boss, Jr.
- Succeeded by: Tristam Burges

2nd Secretary of State of Rhode Island
- In office 1798–1819
- Preceded by: Henry Ward
- Succeeded by: Henry Bowen

Personal details
- Born: March 31, 1769 Johnston, Rhode Island Colony, British America
- Died: February 3, 1839 (aged 69) Providence, Rhode Island, U.S.
- Resting place: North Burial Ground, Providence
- Party: Democratic-Republican, Adams-Clay Republican
- Education: Brown University, 1787
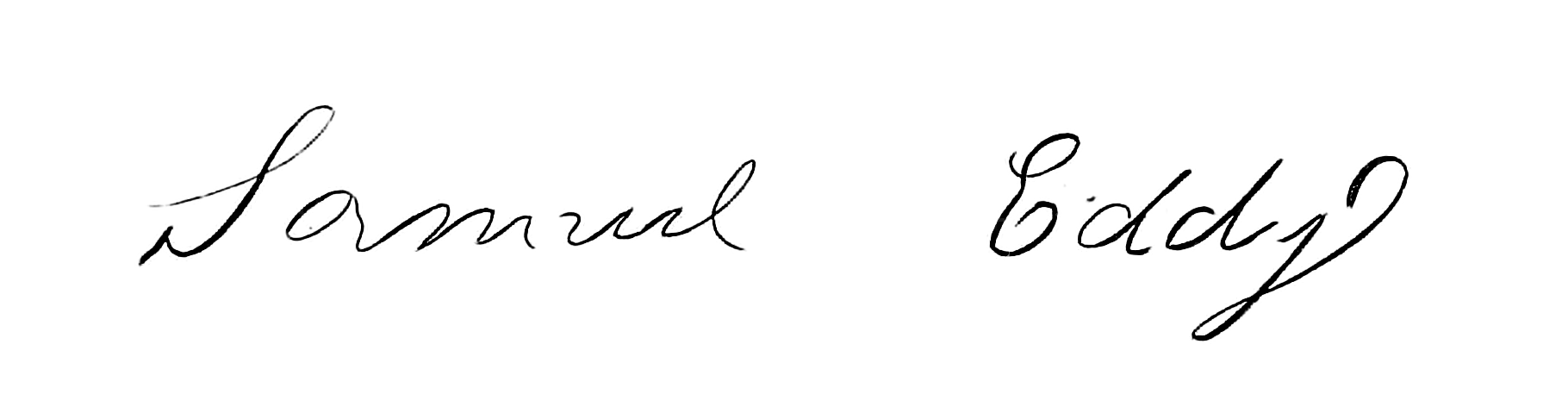
- Signature

Samuel Eddy (March 31, 1769 – February 3, 1839) was a U.S. representative from Rhode Island. Born Johnston in the Colony of Rhode Island and Providence Plantations, Eddy completed preparatory studies. He graduated from Brown University in 1787. He studied law, was admitted to the bar in 1790 and practiced a short time in Providence. He served as clerk of the Rhode Island Supreme Court from 1790 to 1793. He also served as Rhode Island Secretary of State from 1798 to 1819.

Eddy was elected as Democratic-Republican to the Sixteenth and Seventeenth Congresses, and reelected as an Adams-Clay Republican to the Eighteenth Congress (March 4, 1819 – March 3, 1825). He was an unsuccessful candidate for reelection in 1824 to the Nineteenth Congress and for election in 1828 to the Twenty-first Congress. He served as associate justice of the Rhode Island Supreme Court in 1826 and 1827, and served as chief justice 1827 to 1835. Eddy wrote the Court's first published decision, Stoddard v. Martin in 1828. Eddy died in Providence, Rhode Island, February 3, 1839, and was interred in North Burial Ground.

He was elected a member of the American Antiquarian Society in 1819.

== Sources ==
- United States Congress. "Samuel Eddy (id: E000040)". Biographical Directory of the United States Congress.

Political offices
| Preceded by new office | Secretary of State of Rhode Island; 1798–1819 | Succeeded by office abolished |
U.S. House of Representatives
| Preceded by John Linscom Boss, Jr. | Member of the U.S. House of Representatives from Rhode Island's at-large district 1819–1825 | Succeeded by Tristam Burges |
Legal offices
| Preceded by Nathan Brown | Justice of the Rhode Island Supreme Court; 1826–1835 | Succeeded by Levi Haile |
