= Justice Comstock =

Justice Comstock may refer to:

- George F. Comstock (1811–1892), judge of the New York Court of Appeals
- Gideon Comstock (1709–1801), associate justice of the Rhode Island Supreme Court

== See also ==
- Dorothy Comstock Riley (1924–2004), justice of the Michigan Supreme Court
