= Justice Murdock =

Justice Murdock may refer to:

- Glenn Murdock (born 1956), associate justice of the Alabama Supreme Court
- John S. Murdock (1871–1946), associate justice of the Rhode Island Supreme Court
