= William Anthony =

William Anthony may refer to:

- William Anthony (USMC) (1853–1899), U.S. Army soldier and United States Marine who served during the Spanish–American War
- William Anthony (artist) (1934–2022), American painter and illustrator
- William Anthony (bookbinder) (1926–1989), Irish-American bookbinder
- William Anthony (judge) (c. 1752–1832), justice of the Rhode Island Supreme Court
- William Arnold Anthony (1835–1908), U.S. physicist
