= Paul Mumford =

American politician (1734–1805)

3rd Lieutenant Governor of Rhode Island
- In office 1803 – July 20, 1805
- Governor: Arthur Fenner
- Preceded by: Samuel J. Potter
- Succeeded by: vacant (1805-06); Isaac Wilbour (1806-07)

22nd and 24th Chief Justice of the Rhode Island Supreme Court
- In office May 1781 – June 1785
- Preceded by: Shearjashub Bourn
- Succeeded by: William Ellery
- In office May 1786 – June 1788
- Preceded by: William Ellery
- Succeeded by: Othniel Gorton

Personal details
- Born: March 5, 1734 South Kingstown, Colony of Rhode Island and Providence Plantations
- Died: July 20, 1805 (aged 71) Newport, Rhode Island
- Party: Democratic-Republican
- Children: 3

Paul Mumford (March 5, 1734 – July 20, 1805) was an American politician and lawyer. Between 1803 and 1805 he was lieutenant governor of the state of Rhode Island.

== Career ==
Mumford grew up during the British colonial era. He was the son of William Mumford and Ann Wilson Mumford of South Kingstown.

In 1754 he graduated from what would later become Yale University. After a subsequent law degree, he settled in Newport. He joined the American Revolution in the early 1770s. He became a Member of the Rhode Island House of Representatives in 1774 but had to flee to Barrington, Massachusetts, before the advancing British troops. There he was a member of a convention of the New England states at Springfield, Massachusetts, in 1777 to discuss the defence of Rhode Island and the currency issue.

Between 1777 and 1781 Mumford served as a judge in various courts in his home state. Then he was chief justice of the Rhode Island Supreme Court from May 1781 to June 1785 and again from May 1786 to June 1788. From 1779 to 1781 he was again a member of the state House of Representatives. He was the runner-up in the state's October 1790 election to the United States House of Representatives, and was also a candidate in the 1792 election. Between 1801 and 1803 he was a member of the State Senate.

In 1803, Mumford was elected lieutenant governor of Rhode Island alongside Arthur Fenner. He held this office between 1803 and 1805. He was Deputy Governor and Chairman of the State Senate. He died on July 20, 1805, leaving the lieutenant governorship vacant. After Fenner's death on October 15, 1805, his successor as acting governor was President Pro Tempore of the State Senate, Henry Smith.

Political offices
Preceded by Samuel J. Potter	Lieutenant Governor of Rhode Island; 1803-1805	Succeeded by Isaac Wilbour
