= Pecorini =

Pecorini is an Italian surname. Notable people with the surname include:

- Caroline Pecorini (born 1959), English–Australian actress, screenwriter and producer
- Margaret Bucknell Pecorini (1879–1963), American painter
- Nicola Pecorini (born 1957), Italian cinematographer
- Simone Pecorini (born 1993), Italian footballer
