= Thomas Wells (Rhode Island judge) =

American judge (1723–c. 1795)

Thomas Wells (April 5, 1723 – c. 1795) was a justice of the Rhode Island Supreme Court from August 1776 to May 1780.

Born in Hopkinton, Rhode Island, Wells also served at various times in the Rhode Island General Assembly and the Rhode Island Senate, and as a member of the Council of War and Justice.

Wells married Sarah Thompson, with whom he had nine children. He died in Hopkinton.
