= Clarke Howard Johnson =

American judge (1851–1930)

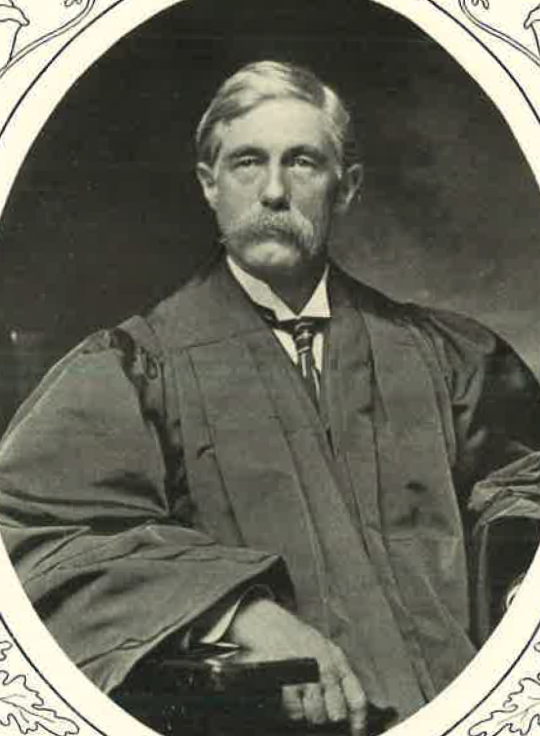
- Johnson c. 1904

Chief Justice of the Rhode Island Supreme Court
- In office 1913–1917
- Preceded by: Edward C. Dubois
- Succeeded by: Christopher F. Parkhurst

Associate Justice of the Rhode Island Supreme Court
- In office 1903–1913

Personal details
- Born: November 18, 1851 Foster, Rhode Island, U.S.
- Died: September 14, 1930 (aged 78) Foster, Rhode Island, U.S.
- Party: Republican
- Spouse: Ida S. Harrington (m. 1889)
- Education: Lapham Institute; Brown University
- Occupation: Judge, politician

Clarke Howard Johnson (November 18, 1851 – September 14, 1930) was a judge and state legislator in Rhode Island. He served as an associate justice of the Rhode Island Supreme Court from 1903 to 1913 and chief justice from 1913 to 1917. He resigned upon reaching the age of 65, as required by state law.

His parents were Elisha and Matilda (Howard) Johnson. He was born in Foster, Rhode Island and educated in its district schools as well as Lapham Institute in North Scituate. He graduated from Brown University in 1877 and was admitted to the Rhode Island Bar in 1879.

He married Ida S. Harrington on December 21, 1889. He served as a Representative in the General Assembly from 1879 to 1902 and as clerk of the House of Representatives from 1881 to 1886. He was a justice of the Eighth District Court from 1886 to 1903. He was elected associate justice of the Supreme Court March 6, 1903. He was a Republican.

In 1921 Rhode Island College conferred an LLD degree on him.

He died September 14, 1930, at his home in Foster, Rhode Island.

Political offices
Preceded by Edward C. Dubois	Chief Justice of the Rhode Island Supreme Court; 1913–1917	Succeeded by Christopher F. Parkhurst
