= William Taggart =

American judge (1733–1798)

William Taggart (September 25, 1733 – January 9, 1798) was a justice of the Rhode Island Supreme Court from May 1793 to June 1795.

He was born in Newport, Rhode Island. He lived in Middletown, Rhode Island.

He and his son William Taggart Jr. spied on the British during the American Revolutionary War. After he was caught, his farm and home were plundered.
