= Stoddard v. Martin =

- Court: Rhode Island Supreme Court
- Full case name: Martin Stoddard v. Wheeler Martin
- Decided: March 1828

Court membership
- Judge sitting: Samuel Eddy

Stoddard v. Martin 1 R.I. 1 (1828) was the first case recorded in the official reports of the Rhode Island Supreme Court.

== Background ==
On October 26, 1826 plaintiff Martin Stoddard bet former Rhode Island Supreme Court justice Wheeler Martin $50 that Ashur Robbins would be elected to the United States Senate. Plaintiff and defendant drew their respective checks for the amount of fifty dollars each check, and delivered both of said checks to a stakeholder, to be delivered to the party that won the bet. The plaintiff won the bet.

Stoddard received a check from Martin on October 26, 1826. On March 5, 1827 Stoddard requested the cashier of Eagle Bank in Providence to pay him the $50 from the check, who refused to pay. On the same day the plaintiff gave the defendant notice, whereby the defendant became liable. A jury awarded the plaintiff the amount bet, plus interest and costs.

On appeal the court reversed the decision stating a bet was void on principles of policy. The court further found that the bet could have produced corruption and debased the character of the individuals.

== Holding ==
In the Court's first officially recorded decision, Chief Justice Samuel Eddy held that a bet on the outcome of the 1826 U.S. Senate election (Ashur Robbins won) was a void contract as against public policy because of its immorality.

Chief Justice Eddy cited British common law precedent to support the decision. Cited cases include: Gilbert and Sykes, (16 East. 156); Vescher v. Yates (11 Johns. 31); Da Costa v. Jones (Cowp. 720); Bunn v. Riker (4 Johns. 428); Lansing v. Lansing (8 Johns. 454).
