= Dutee Arnold =

American judge (1763–1849)

Dutee Arnold (July 30, 1763 – August 13, 1849) was a justice of the Rhode Island Supreme Court from May 1818 to June 1822.

Born in Warwick, Rhode Island, Arnold "was one of the most conspicuous men of the place, and was well-known throughout the State for more than half a century". In June 1817, he was elected an associate justice of the Supreme Court. He took his seat on the bench in May 1818, and continued in office until 1822. He had three children, sons Horatio and Walter, the latter of whom died young, and daughter Marcy, who died unmarried. Henry Arnold, in connection with Dutee Arnold, erected a saw and grist mill in 1810.
