= Thomas Fay =

American judge (1940–2020)

Chief Justice of the Rhode Island Supreme Court
- In office July 3, 1986 – October 9, 1993
- Preceded by: Joseph A. Bevilacqua Sr.
- Succeeded by: Joseph R. Weisberger

Personal details
- Born: Thomas Frederick Fay; October 13, 1940 Central Falls, Rhode Island
- Died: January 31, 2020 (aged 79) Cumberland, Rhode Island
- Spouse: Paulette Demers (m. 1965)
- Children: 1 son, 1 daughter
- Education: Boston University School of Law (J.D.)

Thomas Frederick Fay (October 13, 1940 – January 31, 2020) was the chief justice of the Rhode Island Supreme Court from 1986 to 1993.

Born in Central Falls, Rhode Island, and raised in Lincoln, Rhode Island, Fay received a Juris Doctor degree from Boston University School of Law in 1965. He entered the private practice of law, and in 1968 was elected as a Democrat to the Rhode Island House of Representatives, where he became chair of the House Judiciary Committee. In May 1978, Governor J. Joseph Garrahy appointed Fay to the Rhode Island Family Court.

In 1986, the chief justice of the Rhode Island Supreme Court, Joseph A. Bevilacqua Sr., was the subject of an impeachment investigation for ties to the mob and he submitted his resignation in May effective June 30, 1986. The state legislature elected Fay to succeed Bevilacqua on July 3, 1986.

In 1993, Chief Supreme Court Justice Fay faced allegations of abusing his office to benefit himself and his allies in business and politics, and he resigned on October 9, 1993. Later that year, he pled guilty to two felony charges and two misdemeanor charges of unethical conduct.

Fay married Paulette Demers, with whom he remained for 54 years until his death, and with whom he had a daughter and a son.

Fay died in Cumberland, Rhode Island, at the age of 79.

Political offices
| Preceded by Joseph A. Bevilacqua Sr. | Chief Justice of the Rhode Island Supreme Court; 1986–1993 | Succeeded by Joseph R. Weisberger |
