= Thomas Buffum =

American judge (1776–1852)

Thomas Buffum (1776 – May 19, 1852) was a justice of the Rhode Island Supreme Court from May 1819 to May 1823.

A native of Smithfield, Rhode Island, In addition to his judicial service, Buffum was elected as a Democrat to both houses of the Rhode Island General Assembly.

In his religious affiliation, he was a member of the Society of Friends. Buffum died at his home in Smithfield at the age of 76.
