= Alfred H. Joslin =

American judge (1914–1991)

Alfred Hahn Joslin (January 29, 1914 – October 16, 1991) was a justice of the Rhode Island Supreme Court from 1963 to 1979.

Born in Providence, Rhode Island, Joslin received a B.A. from Brown University in 1936 and a J.D. from Harvard Law School. He "specialized in corporate law before being appointed to the bench".

Joslin was the first Jewish member of the Board of Fellows of Brown University, of which he was secretary from 1972 to 1982.

Joslin died of Parkinson's disease and pancreatic cancer.
