= Picard v. Barry Pontiac-Buick, Inc. =

Picard v. Barry Pontiac-Buick, Inc., 654 A.2d 690 (R.I. 1995) is a Rhode Island Supreme Court case often cited in tort law text books to explain the legal concept of battery.

Picard was unhappy about her mechanic's brake inspection and contacted a local television news "troubleshooter" reporter. When she returned for a reinspection, she took a picture of the mechanic inspecting the brakes on her car. The mechanic turned around, approached her, pointed his finger at her, and questioned her taking a picture of him. He intentionally touched her camera with his finger. Picard claimed that when she spun around her back was injured.

The trial court awarded Picard $60,366 in compensatory damages and an additional $6,350 in punitive damages. The Supreme Court held that the mechanic committed battery, because the mechanic caused an offensive or unconsensual touching upon the body of Picard, regardless of the mechanic's intent to injure. Items attached to or identified with the plaintiff's body, such as the camera, also count. The court also found that the mechanic committed assault. The court vacated the award and remanded for a new trial on damages.
