= Impeachment in Rhode Island =

In the United States state of Rhode Island, the practice of impeachment has been acknowledged since its colonial era as the Colony of Rhode Island and Providence Plantations and has been legally enabled during its statehood. Impeachment allows a legislative body to remove an official from office after a trial.

== Colonial impeachment effort against William Harris ==
On May 20, 1657, Roger Williams petitioned the General Court of Rhode Island (the bicameral legislature) to impeach William Harris for heresy and treason. Per the research of Peter Charles Hoffer and N. E. H. Hull, this was the first instance in Thirteen Colonies in which the term "impeachment" had been used to describe, "lower house charge leading to a trial." Previously, an action that has retrospectively been considered an impeachment occurred in the Colony of Virginia in 1635 to remove John Harvey as its governor. The term "impeachment" was not used contemporarily to describe the action taken against Harvey, however.

The attorney general investigated Harris. His findings were that Harris had written pamphlets that were critical of the colonial government. The case against Harris was heard by the assembly (the General Court's lower house). The assembly decided that, while Harris had been "contemptuous and seditious". Rather than bring any charges itself, it was decided that the assembly would refer the matter to England, writing,

Insamuch as we being soe remote from England, [we] cannot be soe acquainted in laws thereof in that behalf provided [on treason]–through we cannot but conclude [Harris's] behavior therein to be both contemptuous and seditious.

Harris' original writings, the issues raised against him, and Harris's defense were all referred to the government of England.

== State impeachment law and procedures ==
The Constitution of Rhode Island states that "Governor and all other executive and judicial officers" are subject to impeachments on any of the following grounds:

- Incapacitation or guilt for "the commission of a felony or crime of moral turpitude, misfeasance, or malfeasance in office or found incapacitated" (elected officers)
- Incapacitation or guilt for "the commission of a felony or crime of moral turpitude, misfeasance or malfeasance in office or violation of the canons of judicial ethics" (judges)

| Impeachment resolutions will not be considered by the House unless they are signed by a quarter of House members; impeached officers are suspended from office until the judgement of the trial is pronounced; judgement is limited to removal from office (no ability to bar future eligibility to hold office)

Impeachment is initiated by the House of Representatives. A two-thirds vote is needed to impeach a governor, while only a majority vote is required for other officers.

After a vote to impeach, an impeachment trial is held in the Senate. The support of two-thirds of the membership needed to obtain a guilty verdict. Gubernatorial impeachments are to be presided over by either the chief or presiding justice of the Supreme Court.

Per state legislative rules, in order to start an impeachment inquiry (investigation), at least one-quarter of House members must sign a resolution in support of such an investigation.

== Impeachment inquiries conducted after statehood ==
Impeachment processes have been a rare occurrence in Rhode Island, only twice occurring thus far, with two chief justices of the Supreme Court being the subjects of impeachment inquiries. Due to both subjects resigning before the conclusion of each inquiry, neither impeachment process advanced to a vote on impeachment.

=== Joseph A. Bevilacqua Sr. (chief justice of the Supreme Court), 1986 ===
In 1986, Chief Justice Joseph A. Bevilacqua Sr. became the first individual in the then-214 year history of the state subject to impeachment proceedings. The allegations against Bevilacqua centered on his connections with Rhode Island mafia members. He would resign before any vote on impeachment had been held.

Shortly after becoming chief justice in 1976, Bevilacqua officiated the wedding of Joseph A. Badway, an ex-felon who law enforcement described as the chauffeur of Raymond L. S. Patriarca (the boss of the Patriarca crime family). Bevilacqua initially weathered this controversy, with the State Commission on Judicial Tenure and Discipline declining to censure him over this. However, in December 1984, the Providence Journal-Bulletin published revelations about ties which Bevilacqua had maintained to several convicted criminal figures, including Bradway. The newspaper later published another story that Bevilacqua had on at least three different occasions adulterously stayed in rooms at the Alpine Motel (a motel in Smithfield, Rhode Island) with one of two women companions that were not his wife. It was also noted that the hotel was owned by a convicted individual, Eugene D. Carlino.

Amid the reports, the first action taken against Bevilacqua was in the State Commission on Judicial Tenure and Discipline. There, claims of misconduct were brought against Bevilacqua, accusing him of committing adultery, accepting gifts from criminals, and maintaining contacts with criminals. Bevilacqua refused to testify before the commission, and the commission ruled that he had refused to cooperate. Ultimately, Bevilacqua and the commission brokered an agreement for him to take a leave of absence from the court. On November 1, 1985, Bevilacqua ended this and returned to work as a justice.

Allegations made in the news reports were able to be corroborated in part due to the fact that State Police Detective James Mullen had been investigating Bevilacqua's ties to the mob, and Mullen's investigative team had surveilled Bevilacqua and had even taken a photograph showing him zipping up his pant fly while leaving a room at the Alpine Motel. As a result, impeachment action was arose against him. When is reconvened in January 1986, the House was presented with a resolution calling for his impeachment. The resolution was referred to its Judiciary Committee, which began an investigation of Bevilacqua's conduct. On March 20, 1986, the House approved a resolution that authorized and directed the committee to elevate their investigation into a "full and complete" formal impeachment inquiry, and the report to the House their findings and their recommendation as to whether Bevilacqua should be impeached.

In its inquiry, the committee hired former U.S. attorney general Benjamin R. Civiletti to serve as a special counsel for the matter, and for several weeks the committee held "investigatory sessions", which were closed to the public. On May 14, the committee began holding public hearings that were broadcast across most of the state on cable television. Among those that testified were Michael Urso (the former head of the State Police's organized crime task force) and Robert Kramer (reporter for the Journal-Bulletin). During the hearings, Civiletti read into the record multiple transcripts of witness statements that had collected during the previous closed sessions. It became clear during the inquiry that the committee was going to forward a recommendation that the House vote on impeachment. After two weeks of televised public testimony, Justice Bevilacqua tendered his resignation on May 29. DiBevilacqua's resignation letter to Edward D. DiPrete claimed that the stress he, his family, and his friends were facing had motivated his resignation, and also cited the "substantial financial burden" the proceedings were costing the state. Bevilacqua wrote,

Over the past two years my family, friends and indeed myself have suffered greatly, both emotionally and physically. The current proceedings have caused a deterioration in my health to such a degree, that I can no longer continue in my present capacity as Chief Justice.

On the morning of May 28, prior to he announcement of DiBevilacqua's resignation coming later that day, Attorney General Arlene Violet had commented that she would not rule out additional proceedings against him following the conclusion of an impeachment process.

=== Thomas Fay (chief justice of the Supreme Court), 1993 ===
Chief Justice Thomas Fay (the immediate successor of Bevilacqua) faced an impeachment process in 1993 that led to his resignation. In September 1993, House lawmakers approved a resolution to launch an impeachment inquiry into Fay over alleged criminal ethics violations. Several weeks later, Fay resigned. This is the most recent instance in which impeachment proceedings have been initiated in Rhode Island.

== Other impeachment efforts ==
In late 2023, State Representative Enrique Sanchez, a Democrat from Providence, proposed the idea of impeaching Peter Alviti Jr. (state transportation director) over state management of Providence's Washington Bridge. The bridge had several lanes closed due to structural issues. Sanchez raised specific allegations to be investigated, all of which would have been allegations of misfeasance and malfeasance rather than of criminal conduct.

== See also ==
- Impeachment by state and territorial governments of the United States
- Impeachment in the United States
