= Isaac Wilbour =

American judge

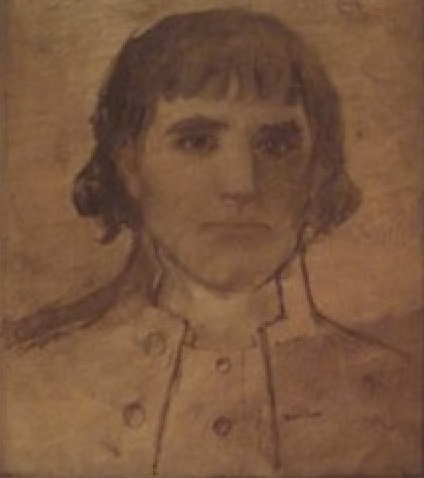
- Close up of portion of 1894's "The Governor's Grandsons", a portrait by Edwin Howland Blashfield.

Member of the U.S. House of Representatives from Rhode Island's at-large district
- In office March 4, 1807 – March 3, 1809
- Preceded by: Joseph Stanton, Jr.
- Succeeded by: Elisha Reynolds Potter

6th Governor of Rhode Island
- In office May 7, 1806 – May 6, 1807
- Lieutenant: Himself
- Preceded by: Henry Smith
- Succeeded by: James Fenner

4th Lieutenant Governor of Rhode Island
- In office 1806–1807
- Governor: Himself
- Preceded by: Paul Mumford
- Succeeded by: Constant Taber
- In office 1810–1811
- Governor: James Fenner
- Preceded by: Simeon Martin
- Succeeded by: Simeon Martin

34th Chief Justice of the Rhode Island Supreme Court
- In office 1819–1827
- Preceded by: James Fenner
- Succeeded by: Samuel Eddy

Personal details
- Born: April 25, 1763 Little Compton, Colony of Rhode Island, British America
- Died: October 4, 1837 (aged 74) Little Compton, Rhode Island, U.S.
- Resting place: Seaconnet Cemetery
- Party: Democratic-Republican

Isaac Wilbour (April 25, 1763 – October 4, 1837) was an American politician from Rhode Island holding several offices, including the sixth governor of the state.

== Biography ==
Wilbour was born in Little Compton in the Colony of Rhode Island and Providence Plantations. He served in the state legislature in 1805 and 1806. From October 1805 to May 1806 he served as speaker. He was Lieutenant Governor from 1806 to 1807. There had been no winner in the gubernatorial election in 1806, so he was Acting Governor from May 7, 1806, to May 6, 1807.

Wilbour represented Rhode Island in the United States House of Representatives as a Democratic-Republican from 1807 to 1809. He ran again in 1808 and 1812 but lost both times. He served as Lieutenant Governor again from 1810 to 1811.

In May 1818 he became an associate justice of the Supreme Court of Rhode Island and acted as Chief Justice of that court from May 1819 to May 1827.

Wilbour died in Little Compton, Rhode Island, and his remains were buried in the Seaconnet Cemetery.

Political offices
Preceded by Henry Smith	Governor of Rhode Island; 1806–1807	Succeeded by James Fenner
Preceded by Paul Mumford	Lieutenant Governor of Rhode Island; 1806–1807	Succeeded by Constant Taber
Preceded by Simeon Martin	Lieutenant Governor of Rhode Island; 1810–1811	Succeeded by Simeon Martin
U.S. House of Representatives
Preceded by Joseph Stanton, Jr.	Member of the U.S. House of Representatives from Rhode Island's at-large district 1807–1809	Succeeded by Elisha Reynolds Potter
