= George A. Wilbur =

American judge (1832–1906)

George Albert Wilbur (August 4, 1832 – June 9, 1906) was Rhode Island judge and legislator who served as a justice of the Rhode Island Supreme Court from 1885 to 1905.

Born in Burrillville, Rhode Island, Wilbur was admitted to the bar in 1862. he delayed the start of his legal career in order to serve in the Union Army during the American Civil War. He enlisted in 1862, was promoted to the rank of captain, and "after having seen much hard service in the field", was mustered out at the end of the war. From 1865 to 1872, he was presiding justice of the Woonsocket court of magistrates. From 1872 to 1885 he was the trial justice of the Justice Court of Woonsocket. He then served in the Rhode Island Senate for five years, during a portion of that time chairman of the Judiciary Committee. Upon the resignation of Justice George Moulton Carpenter Jr. in 1885, Wilbur was elected an associate justice of the state supreme court. By assignment of the court he also presided over the Court of Common Pleas early in his supreme court service, his time being largely taken in the trial of the criminal docket.

Following the death of chief justice Pardon E. Tillinghast in 1905, Wilbur declined to succeed Tillinghast as chief justice, and instead announced his intent to retire from the court. He did so in May 1905, and died at his home in Woonsocket in June of the following year, at the age of 74.
