= Ambrose Page =

American judge (1724–1791)

Ambrose Page (1723 – December 29, 1791) was a Rhode Island state legislator and admiralty judge who declined a seat as Justice of the Rhode Island Supreme Court in May 1781.

A native of Providence, Rhode Island, he "was a sea captain during the Seven Years' War", and served in the Rhode Island General Assembly. He was a judge of the court of admiralty from 1787 to 1790, prior to which he "had been judge of the Superior Court and of the Common Pleas, and member of the Council of War". He was described in the Providence Gazette as "for many Years a respectable nautical Commander from [Providence], and had sustained several Offices of public Trust, the Duties of which he discharged with Ability and Integrity".

Page married Alice Smith, with whom he had a son, Benjamin Page, who served on ships in the American Revolutionary War.
