= Joseph R. Weisberger =

American judge

39th Chief Justice of the Rhode Island Supreme Court
- In office March 1993 – February 2001
- Preceded by: Thomas Fay
- Succeeded by: Frank J. Williams

Personal details
- Born: Joseph Robert Weisberger; August 3, 1920 Providence, Rhode Island, U.S.
- Died: December 7, 2012 (aged 92) Providence, Rhode Island, U.S.
- Party: Republican
- Spouse: Sylvia Pigeon
- Education: Brown University (BA); Harvard University (JD)

Military service
- Allegiance: United States
- Branch/service: United States Navy
- Years of service: 1941–1946
- Rank: Lieutenant commander
- Battles/wars: World War II

Joseph Robert Weisberger (August 3, 1920 – December 7, 2012) was an American politician and jurist.

Weisberger graduated from Brown University and Harvard Law School and served in the Navy during World War II. Weisberger served in the Rhode Island State Senate as a Republican. He was named a Rhode Island state court judge and then named to the Rhode Island Supreme Court where he was the chief justice from 1993 until his retirement in 2000.
