= Benjamin M. Bosworth =

American judge (1848–1899)

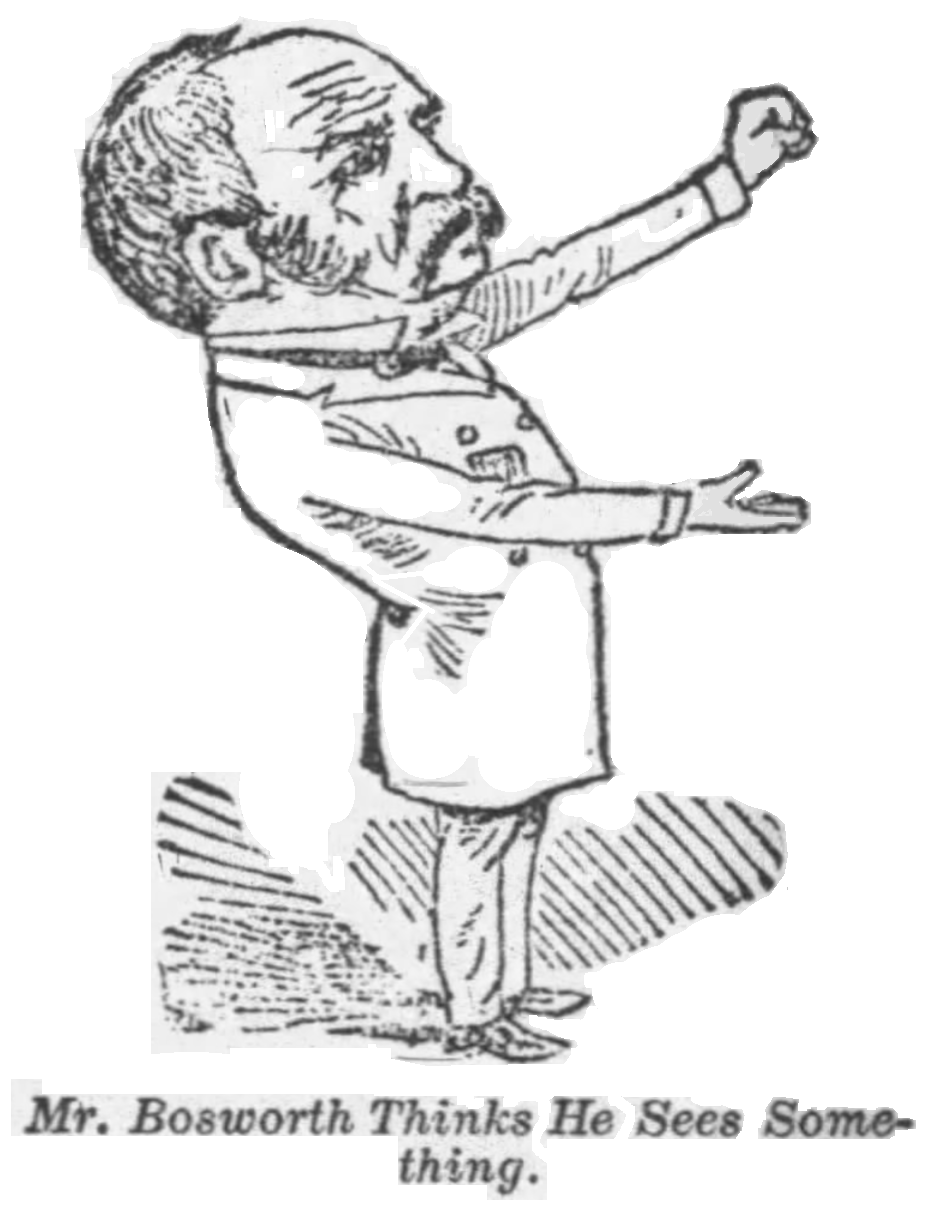
Political cartoon of Benjamin M. Bosworth at the 1888 Republican National Convention.

Benjamin Miller Bosworth (January 17, 1848 – February 7, 1899) was a state representative in Rhode Island, and a justice of the Rhode Island Supreme Court from 1897 until his death in 1899.

== Biography ==
Born in Warren, Rhode Island, Bosworth served in the Rhode Island House of Representatives from 1880 to 1882, and again from 1885 to 1886. He was a district judge of Rhode Island's 5th District from 1886 to 1897, when he took office as a justice of the Rhode Island Supreme Court. He was confirmed to a newly established seat on the court without opposition on May 18, 1897, and assumed office on June 2, 1897.

In 1888, Bosworth served as a delegate to the Republican National Convention, where he championed the candidacy of William B. Allison.

== Personal life and death ==
On March 17, 1875, he married Mary M. Cole. They had no surviving children. Bosworth had a history of heart disease, and died in his home of a sudden heart attack after returning from a trip to the public library in Warren, where he helped to catalog the books.

Political offices
Preceded by Newly established seat.	Justice of the Rhode Island Supreme Court; 1897–1899	Succeeded by Edward C. Dubois
