= Margaret Bucknell Pecorini =

American painter

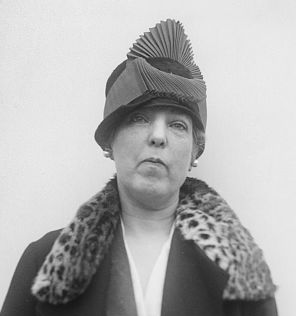
Margaret Bucknell Pecorini

Margaret Bucknell Pecorini (1879–1963) was an American painter.

A native of Philadelphia, Margaret Crozer Bucknell was the daughter of the patron of Bucknell University, William Bucknell and his third wife, Titanic survivor Emma (Ward) Bucknell.

She studied in Paris, at the Académie Julian, and occasionally showed work at the Paris Salon. She married twice, first to Charles F. Stearns – Chief Justice of the Supreme Court of Rhode Island – and second to Count Daniele Pecorini of Rome.

She worked for the International Red Cross in Italy during World War I and in London during World War II.

As a painter, she specialized in children's portraits. Pecorini's portrait of Janet Scudder is in the collection of the National Academy of Design, and a painting titled Baby in White Cap is in the Brooklyn Museum.

She died in Guttenberg, New Jersey.
