= Henry Smith (Rhode Island politician) =

American politician

5th Governor of Rhode Island
- In office October 15, 1805 – May 7, 1806
- Preceded by: Arthur Fenner
- Succeeded by: Isaac Wilbour

Personal details
- Born: February 10, 1766 Providence, Colony of Rhode Island, British America
- Died: June 28, 1818 (aged 52)
- Resting place: North Burial Ground; Providence, Rhode Island

Henry Smith (February 10, 1766 – June 28, 1818) was the fifth governor of Rhode Island from October 15, 1805, to May 7, 1806.

Smith was born in Providence in the Colony of Rhode Island and Providence Plantations. He was educated in Providence, and became a successful merchant. He served as an officer in the militia, and attained the rank of colonel in a Providence County unit known as the Providence Independent Light Dragoons.

As a result of his business success, in the early 1800s Smith constructed a mansion at Smith and Davis Streets on Smith Hill in Providence. Known as the Colonel Henry Smith House, it stood until the early 1920s, when it was razed to allow for construction of an annex for the Rhode Island State House.

Elected to the Rhode Island Senate in 1803, he was the leader of the senate or "first senator" when Governor Arthur Fenner died. Lieutenant Governor Paul Mumford had died before Fenner, so as first senator Smith succeeded to the governorship.

He died on June 28, 1818, and was buried at North Burial Ground in Providence.

Party political offices
Preceded by Arthur Fenner	Country nominee for Governor of Rhode Island; 1806	Succeeded by None
Political offices
Preceded by Arthur Fenner	Governor of Rhode Island; 1805–1806	Succeeded by Isaac Wilbour
