= Daniel Champlin =

American judge (1769–1832)

Daniel Champlin (October 3, 1769 – April 3, 1832) was a bank president and justice of the Rhode Island Supreme Court from May 1818 to May 1827.

Born in Exeter, Rhode Island to Colonel Benjamin H. Champlin (1741–1817) and Elizabeth Gardiner (1743–1819), Champlin had a farm in that town. The History of Washington and Kent counties, Rhode Island notes that after the North Kingston Bank was relocated from Kingston to Wickford in 1819 Champlin was elected president, and served in that office from its organization to 1825.

He was "a well-known and respected Exeter farmer and judge" who lived on a large farm in the Yawgoog Valley. Champlin "purchased the house as a gift for his son Benjamin Champlin, who was a Major of the 8th Regiment of the Washington County troops of the Rhode Island State Militia. ... Benjamin Champlin died in September 1814 at the age of 25. ... Daniel Champlin re-assumed ownership of this house after his son's tragic death, and eventually sold it, in 1819".

On May 8, 1818, Champlin and four others were elected to the state supreme court by the legislature, as part of the Democratic Party coming into control of the entire state government.

In 1820, Champlin received one vote in the Rhode Island General Assembly in their election of a United States Senator, with the election being won by James DeWolf.

Champlin married Penelope Allen on December 22, 1788. He died in Exeter at the age of 62.
