= John S. Murdock =

American judge (1871–1946)

John S. Murdock (December 25, 1871 – December 19, 1946) was a justice of the Rhode Island Supreme Court from 1929 to 1935.

== Life and career ==
Born in Massachusetts to Thomas and Jane Dunlop Murdock, Murdock received his undergraduate degree from Brown University in 1896, and his law degree from Harvard Law School in 1899. He had his legal career in Providence, Rhode Island, becoming a partner in the law firm of Murdock & Tillinghast in 1911, and serving as the United States Attorney for the District of Rhode Island. A Republican, he was appointed to the Rhode Island Supreme Court in 1929, to a seat vacated by the resignation of Chief Justice William H. Sweetland. In 1935, the Democrats unexpectedly gained control of the state legislature, and ousted the entire court in favor of a new, entirely Democratic group.

Murdock later served as a member of the Regional War Labor Board, and then as a member of the Wage Stabilization Board.

== Personal life and death ==
Murdock married Nettie V. Goodale in 1901.

He died from a heart attack in Boston, Massachusetts, at the age of 74, while preparing to preside over Wage Stabilization Board hearing.

Political offices
Preceded by William H. Sweetland	Justice of the Rhode Island Supreme Court; 1929–1935	Succeeded by Court reconstituted
