= Joseph A. Bevilacqua Sr. =

American judge

Joseph A. Bevilacqua
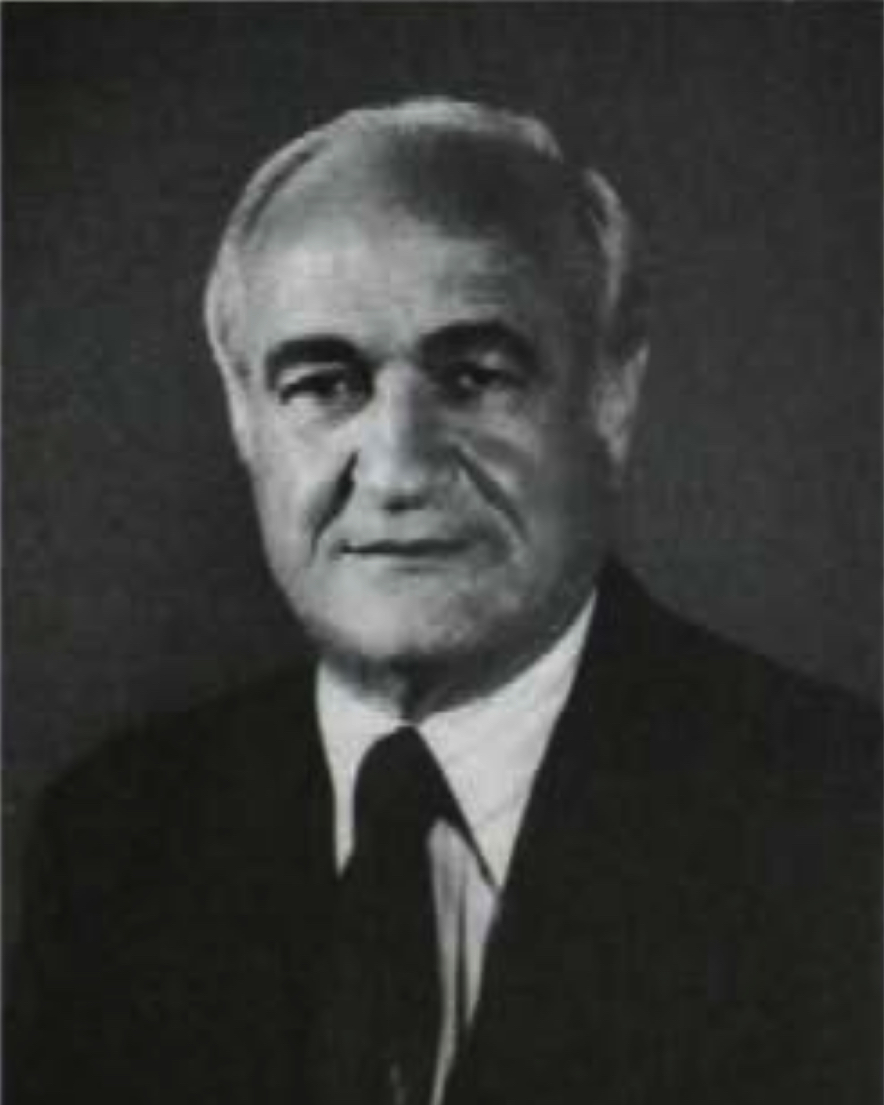

37th Chief Justice of the Rhode Island Supreme Court
- In office January 26, 1976 – June 30, 1986
- Preceded by: Thomas H. Roberts
- Succeeded by: Thomas F. Fay

215th Speaker of the Rhode Island House of Representatives
- In office January 7, 1969 – January 26, 1976
- Preceded by: John J. Wrenn
- Succeeded by: John J. Skiffington Jr.

Member of the Rhode Island House of Representatives
- In office January 4, 1955 – January 26, 1976
- Preceded by: Alfred P. Perrotti
- Succeeded by: Frank J. Fiorenzano
- Constituency: 16th Providence district (1955‍–‍1967); 13th district (1967‍–‍1976)

Personal details
- Born: Joseph Anthony Bevilacqua; December 1, 1918 Providence, Rhode Island, United States
- Died: June 21, 1989 (aged 70) Boston, Massachusetts, United States
- Party: Democratic
- Spouse: Josephine Amato
- Education: Providence College (BA); Georgetown University (JD)
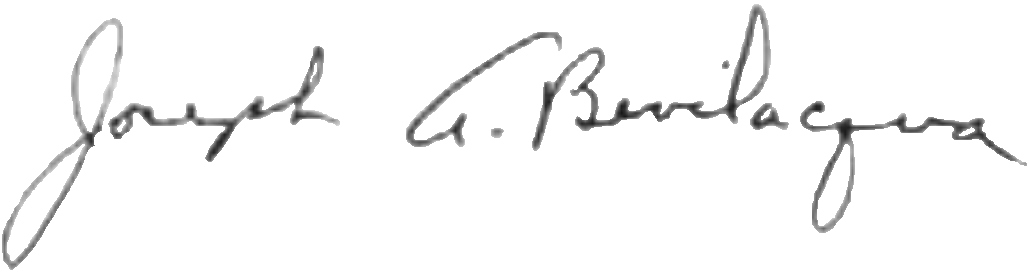
- Signature

Military service
- Branch/service: United States Army
- Years of service: 1941–1946
- Rank: First lieutenant
- Battles/wars: World War II; European theater
- Awards: Purple Heart

Joseph Anthony Bevilacqua Sr. (December 1, 1918 – June 21, 1989) was chief justice of the Rhode Island Supreme Court from 1976 through 1986. His career was tarnished due to his association with organized crime.

== Early life and career ==
Bevilacqua grew up in Silver Lake, an Italian-American neighborhood of Providence. He attended Providence public schools and received a Bachelor of Arts from Providence College in 1940. He served in the Army from 1941 to 1946, achieving the rank of First Lieutenant and serving in the Italian campaign of World War II where he was wounded and received a Purple Heart. He received a Juris Doctor degree from Georgetown Law School in 1948, and his clients and friends included organized crime figures.

== Political career ==
Bevilacqua was elected to the Rhode Island House in 1954; he became majority leader in 1966 and Speaker in 1969. He worked for the passage of the state's medicare statute and for job retraining measures. He was elected by the General Assembly as Chief Justice of the State Supreme Court in 1976, and he promised to put aside "old friendships and causes." Privately, however, he reassured mobster Nicholas Bianco: "Don't worry, I'll still keep my connections."

Around this time, a number of allegations surfaced regarding Bevilacqua's ties to organized crime. The New York Times stated that allegations had been made in 1976 that he had harbored a fugitive from a 1963 department store robbery, and had accepted a payment of $2,000 from him. It also became public that he had written a letter to the State Parole Board in 1973 vouching for the integrity of crime boss Raymond L. S. Patriarca. The letter read, "To whom it may concern: I have known Mr. Patriarca for a good many years. I have found him to be a good person of integrity and, in my opinion, good moral character." Bevilacqua officiated at the wedding of Patriarca's chauffeur, who was under indictment for fraud. The State Commission on Judicial Tenure and Discipline investigated these incidents and took no action.

== Impeachment proceedings and resignation ==
The Providence Journal brought public attention to Bevilacqua's ties to organized crime figures in 1984. State police officers followed him as he visited the homes of crime figures, and he was also observed frequenting a mob-connected motel for mid-day trysts with women. The Journal ran a front-page photo of him zipping his pants fly while leaving the Alpine Motel in Smithfield, Rhode Island.

A judicial commission headed by former Supreme Court Justice Arthur Goldberg censured Bevilacqua for associating with criminals. The General Assembly began impeachment proceedings in 1986, the first such proceedings in the state's history, but Bevilacqua resigned during the proceedings, on May 27, 1986. He left office at the end of the court term, on June 30, 1986.

== Death ==
Bevilacqua was hospitalized several times in his last few months, including for a heart attack in early May 1989. He was taken to Brigham and Women's Hospital on May 30, 1989 and died there on June 21. His funeral mass was celebrated at Saint Bartholomew Church in Providence, Rhode Island and he is buried in Saint Ann Cemetery in Cranston, Rhode Island.

Rhode Island House of Representatives
Preceded by Alfred P. Perrotti	Rhode Island Representative from the 16th Providence District; 1955–1967	Succeeded by None
Preceded by None	Rhode Island Representative from the 13th District; 1967–1976	Succeeded by Frank J. Fiorenzano
Political offices
Preceded by John J. Wrenn	Speaker of the Rhode Island House of Representatives; 1969–1976	Succeeded by John J. Skiffington Jr.
Legal offices
Preceded by Thomas H. Roberts	Chief Justice of the Rhode Island Supreme Court; 1976–1986	Succeeded by Thomas F. Fay
