= William Ellery =

Founding Father of the United States (1727–1820)

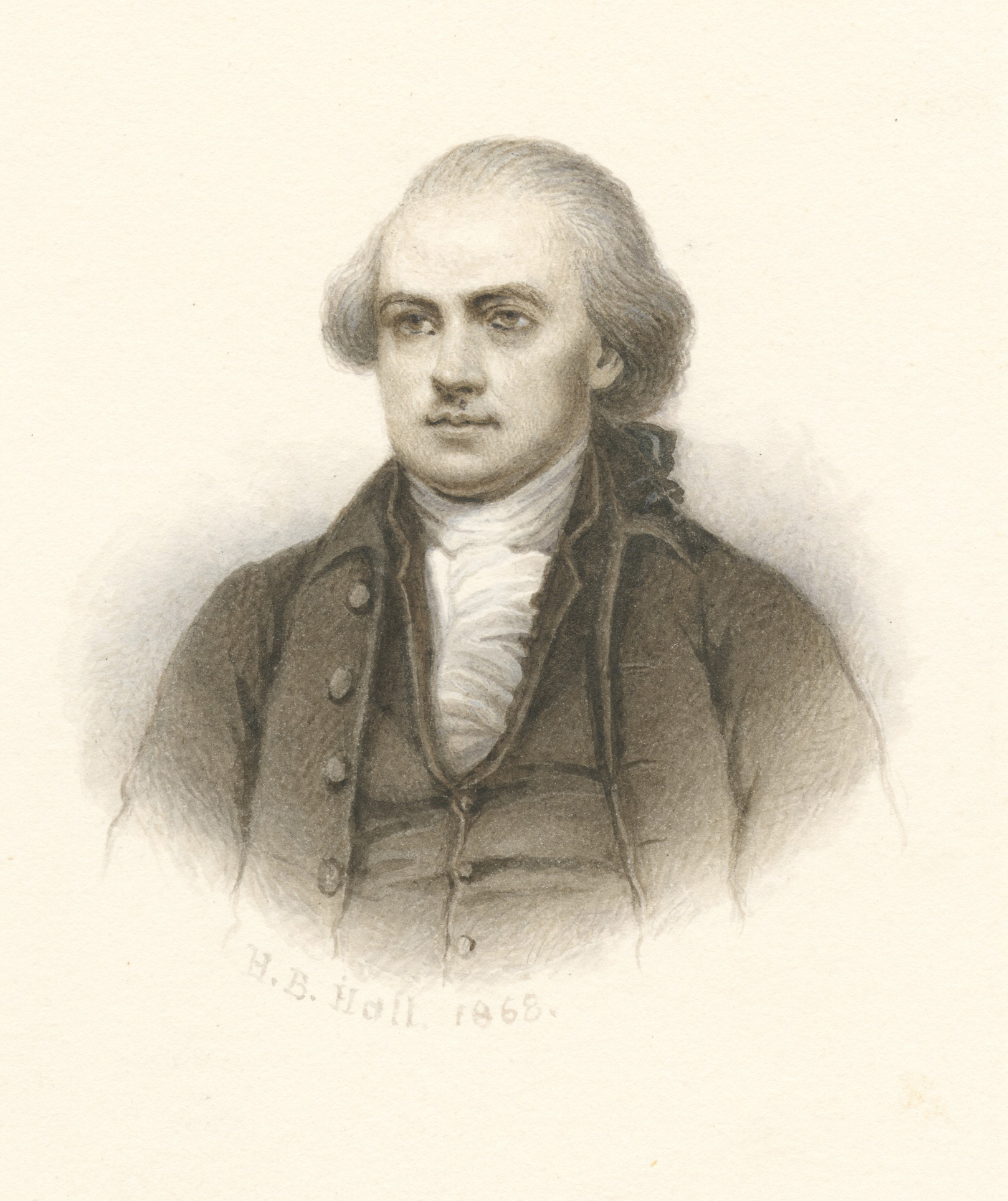
- Engraving of Ellery by Henry Bryan Hall

23rd Chief Justice of the Rhode Island Supreme Court
- In office June 1785 – May 1786
- Preceded by: Paul Mumford
- Succeeded by: Paul Mumford

Personal details
- Born: December 22, 1727 Newport, Colony of Rhode Island and Providence Plantations, British America
- Died: February 15, 1820 (aged 92) Newport, Rhode Island, U.S.
- Resting place: Common Burying Ground, Newport
- Occupation: Lawyer
- Known for: signer of the United States Declaration of Independence
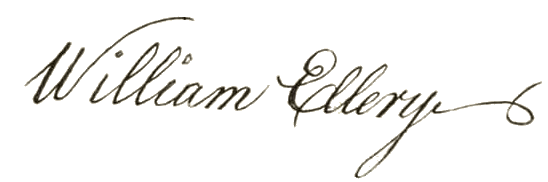
- Signature

William Ellery (December 22, 1727 – February 15, 1820) was a Founding Father of the United States, one of the 56 signers of the United States Declaration of Independence, and a signer of the Articles of Confederation as a representative of Rhode Island.

In 1764, the Baptists consulted with Ellery and Congregationalist Reverend Ezra Stiles on writing a charter for the college that became Brown University. Ellery and Stiles attempted to give control of the college to the Congregationalists, but the Baptists withdrew the petition until it was rewritten to assure Baptist control. Neither Ellery nor Stiles accepted appointment to the reserved Congregationalist seats on the board of trustees.

== Biography ==
Ellery was born in Rhode Island on December 22, 1727, the second son of William Ellery Sr. and Elizabeth Almy, a descendant of Thomas Cornell. He received his early education from his father, a merchant and Harvard College graduate. He graduated from Harvard College in 1747, where he excelled in Greek and Latin. He then returned to Newport where he worked first as a merchant, next as a customs collector, and then as clerk of the Rhode Island General Assembly. He started practicing law in 1770 at age 43 and became active in the Rhode Island Sons of Liberty.

Statesman Samuel Ward died in 1776, and Ellery replaced him in the Continental Congress. He was a signer of the Articles of Confederation and one of the 56 signers of the Declaration of Independence in 1776. The size of his signature on the Declaration is second only to John Hancock's famous signature.

Ellery also served as an associate justice of the Supreme Court of Rhode Island from May 1780 to May 1781, and chief justice from June 1785 to May 1786. He had become an abolitionist by 1785. He was the first customs collector of the port of Newport under the Constitution, serving there until his death, and he worshipped at the Second Congregational Church of Newport.

Ellery died on February 15, 1820, at age 92 and was buried in Common Burial Ground in Newport. The Rhode Island Society of the Sons of the Revolution and the William Ellery Chapter of the Daughters of the American Revolution make an annual commemoration at his grave on Independence Day.

== Family and legacy ==
Coat of Arms of William Ellery

Ellery married Ann Remington of Cambridge, Massachusetts, in 1750. She was the daughter of Judge Jonathan Remington. She died in 1764 in Cambridge and was buried there, and he married Abigail Cary in 1767. He had 19 children, and his descendants include Ellery Channing, Washington Allston, William Ellery Channing, Richard Henry Dana Sr., Edie Sedgwick, Paulita Sedgwick, Kyra Sedgwick and Andra Akers. Francis Dana married his daughter Elizabeth. His great-great-grandnephew, Major Elbert Ellery Anderson (1833–1903), took his middle name from him.

Ellery left a humorous record of his travels (on a mount he refers to as "my Jenny") from Massachusetts to Philadelphia in 1778 and 1779 that was published in serial form in the Pennsylvania Magazine of History and Biography of the Historical Society of Pennsylvania (1887).

William Ellery is the namesake of the town of Ellery, New York, and Ellery Avenue in Middletown, Rhode Island, is named in his honor.

== Images ==
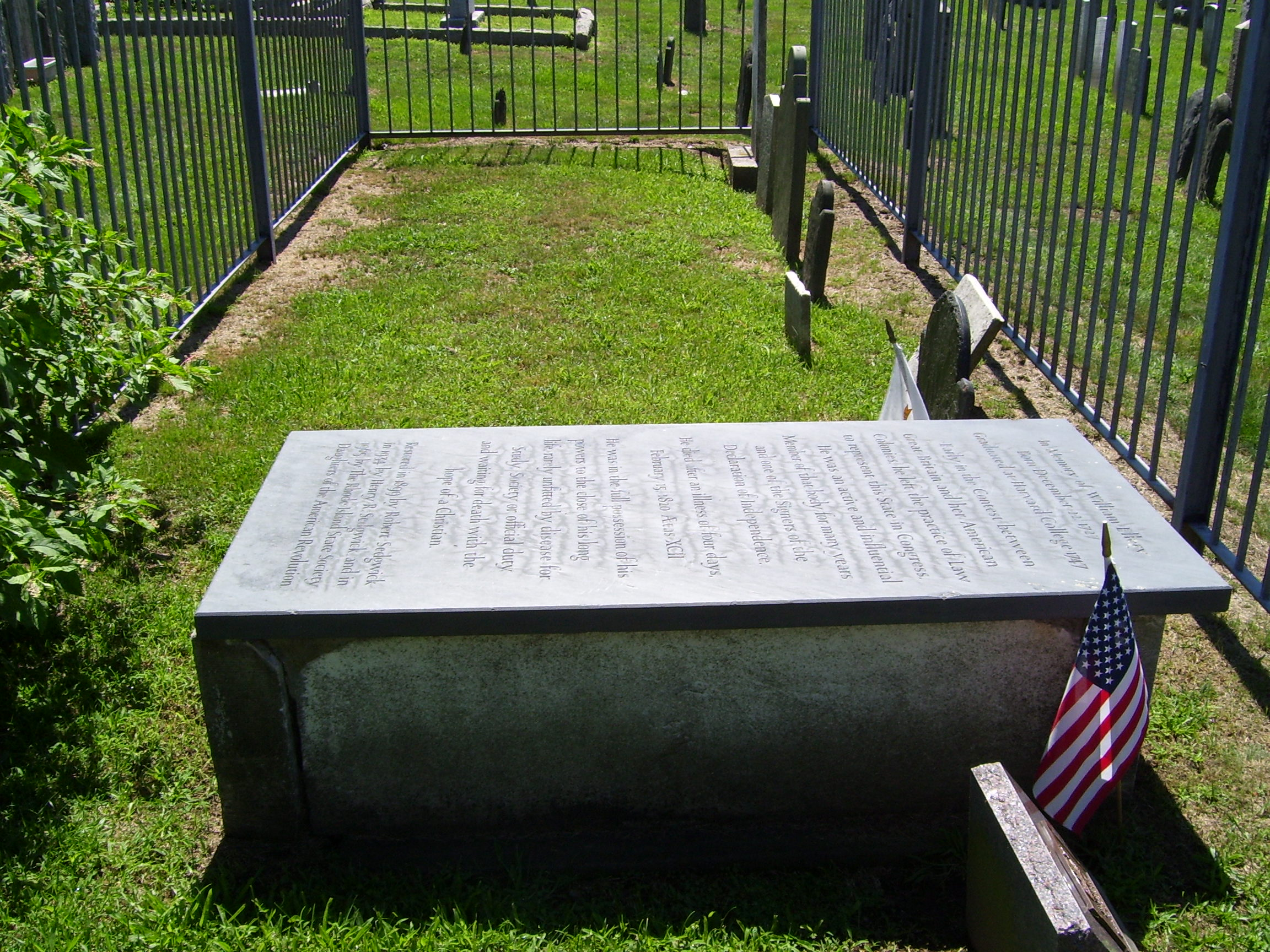
Ellery's tomb at Common Burying Ground and Island Cemetery in Newport

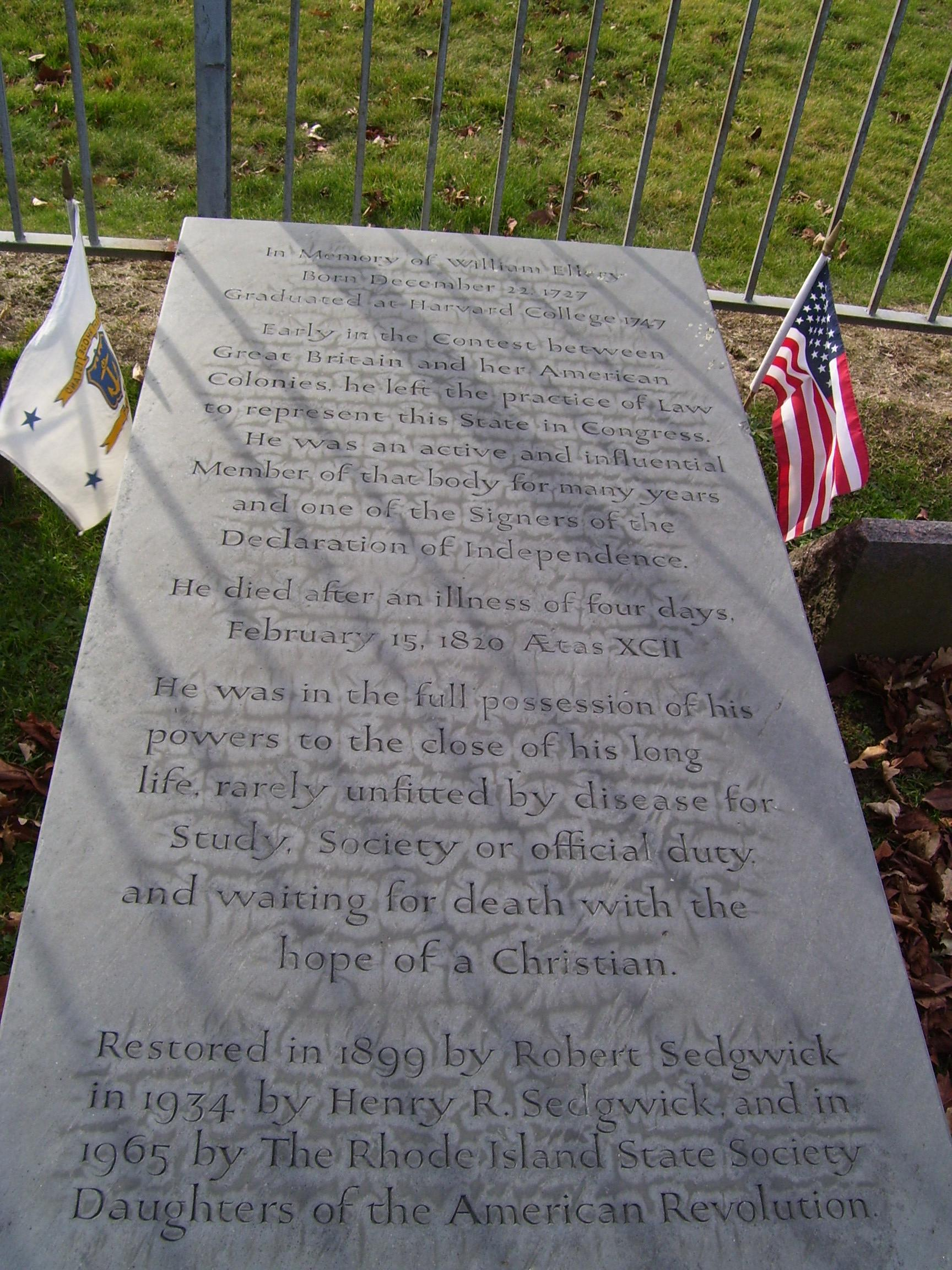
William Ellery's grave inscription

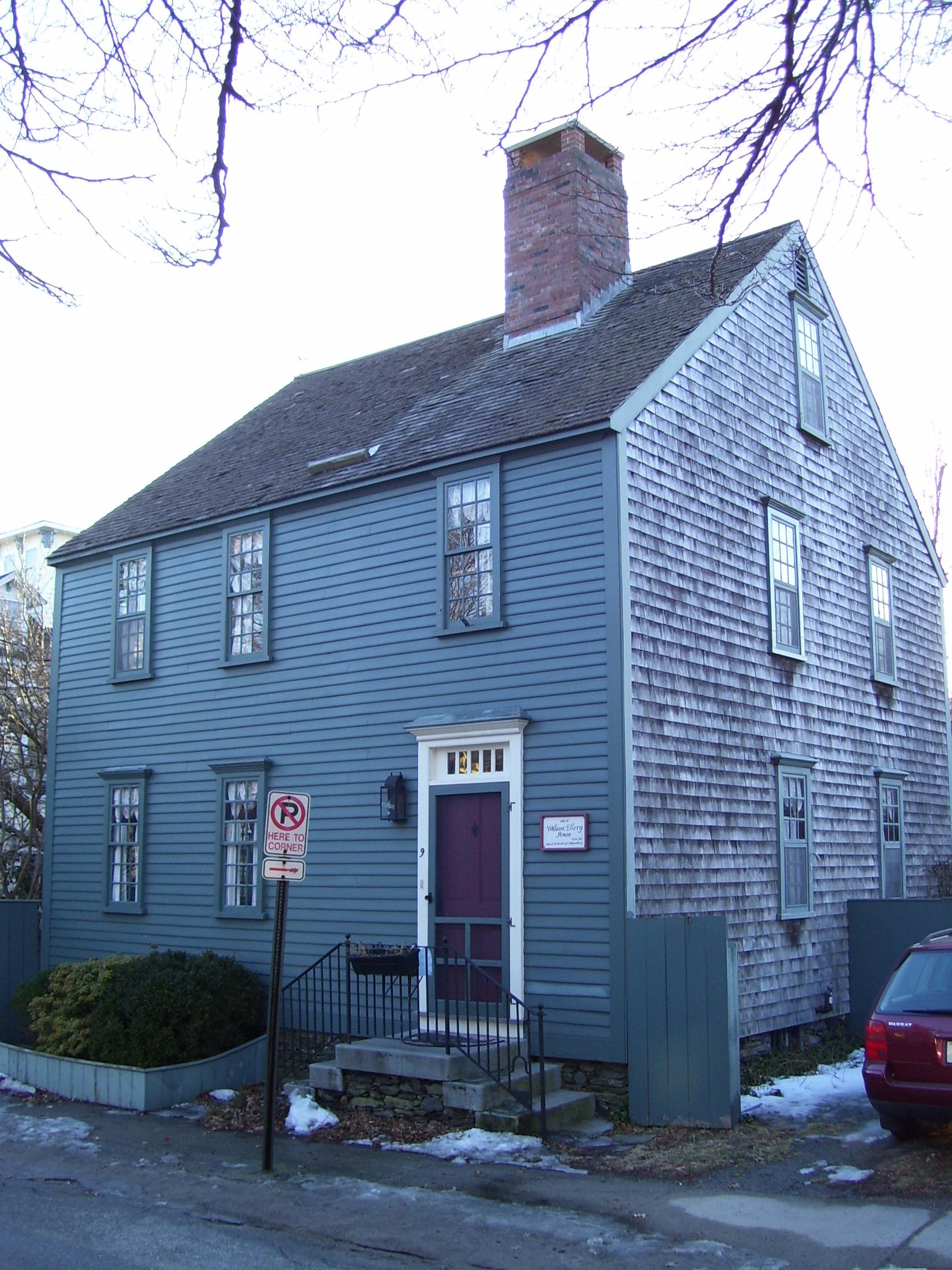
Site of Ellery's house in Newport on Thames Street near his burial site

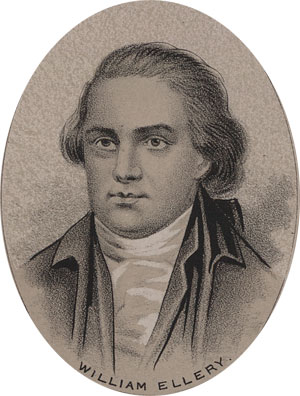
William Ellery by Ole Erekson, engraver
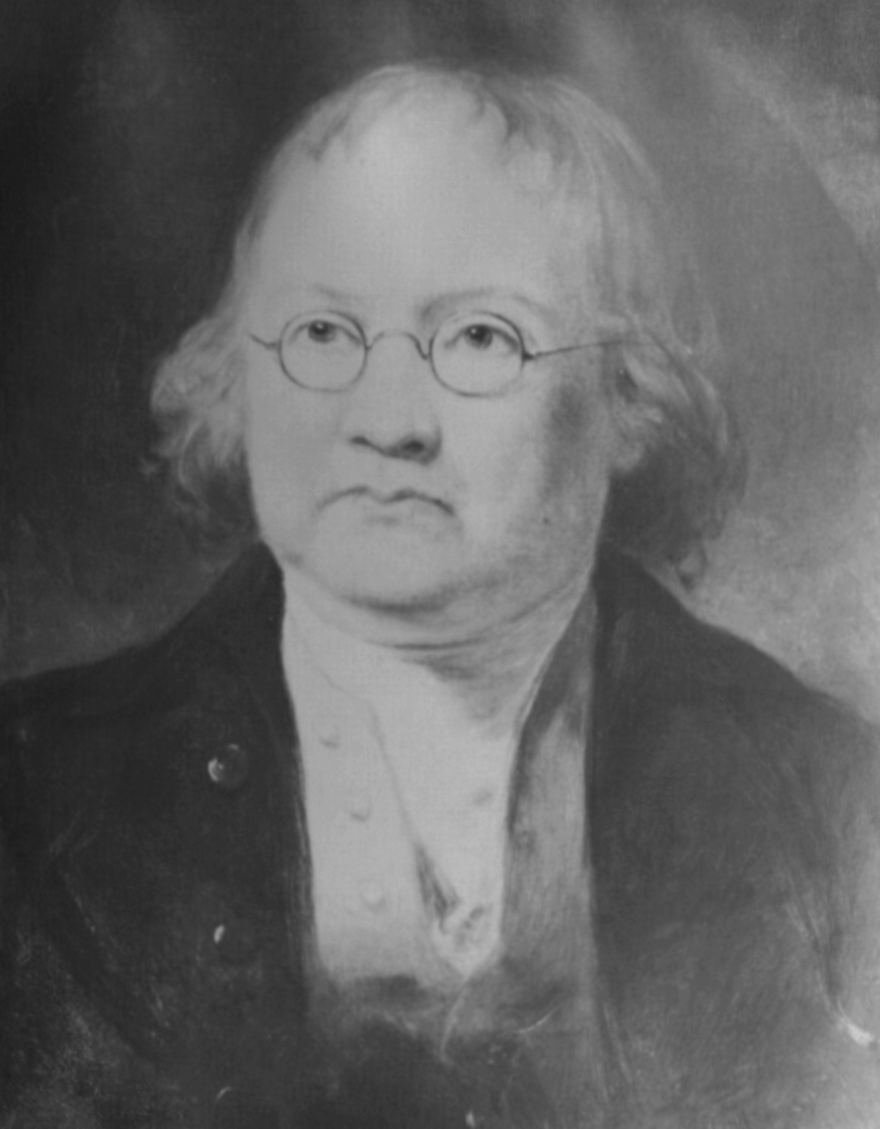
William Ellery

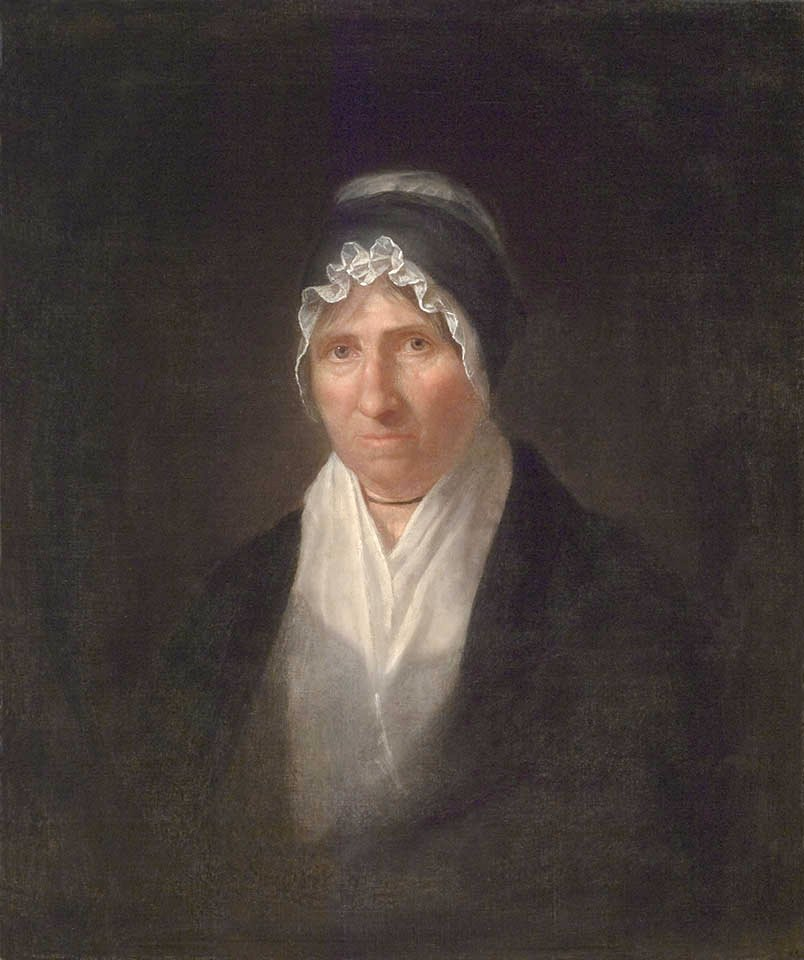
William Ellery daughter Lucy [Ellery] Channing

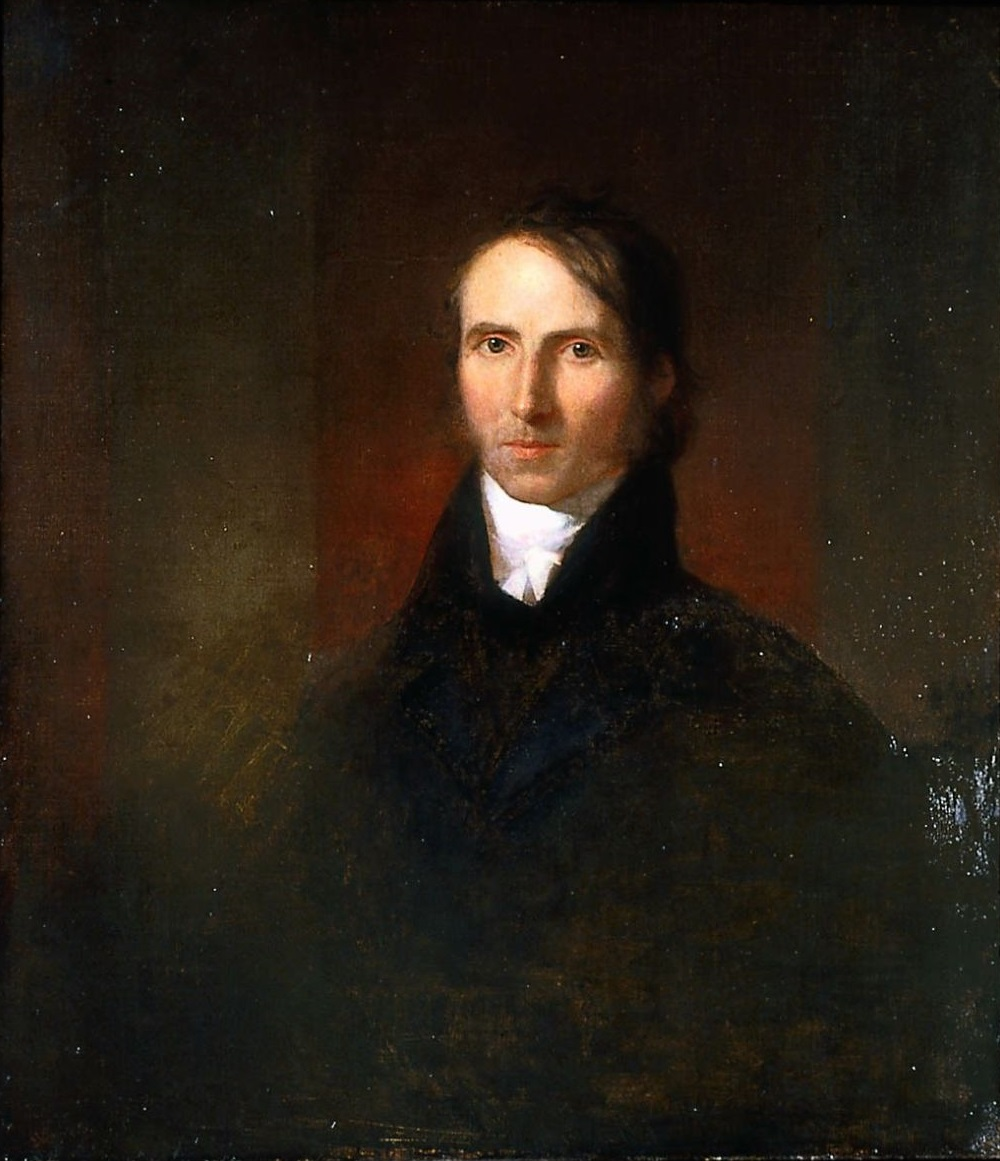
William Ellery grandson William Ellery Channing

== See also ==
- Memorial to the 56 Signers of the Declaration of Independence
