= Joseph Russell (judge) =

American judge (1702–1780)

Joseph Russell (October 11, 1702 – July 31, 1780) was a silversmith and public official in the Thirteen Colonies who served as chief justice of the Rhode Island Supreme Court from May 1765 to May 1767, and again from May 1768 to June 1769. He also served as an associate justice from May 1751 to August 1763, and again from May 1774 to August 1776.

== Biography ==
Born in Barnstable, Massachusetts, to Jonathan Russell, a reverend, and Martha Moody Russell, Russell apprenticed as a silversmith under Edward Winslow in Boston beginning in 1715, and came to Bristol, Rhode Island, after 1733, and resided there for the remainder of his life. He continued his profession as a silversmith while also serving in various public offices, and was described as "a man of note" in the town. He served as a representative in the Rhode Island General Assembly from 1751 to 1755, and from 1758 and 1759, both periods falling within his service as an associate justice of the Rhode Island Supreme Court from May 1751 to August 1763. He served as chief justice of the court from 1765 to June, 1769, (with the exception of one year, from May 1767 to May 1768), and served as an associate justice again from May 1774 to August 1776.

== Personal life and death ==
Russell married Anne Vassall in 1728, and married again to Sarah Paine on January 10, 1733, in Taunton, Massachusetts. Russell died in Bristol at the age of 78. His son, Jonathan Russell, was the first Collector of the Customs, of the port of Bristol, appointed by President Thomas Jefferson. Jonathan died in Bristol, in 1815. Russell also left two other children, Nathaniel and Nancy. A beaker in the holdings of the Metropolitan Museum of Art in New York City is attributed to his work as a silversmith.
