= Christopher F. Parkhurst =

American judge (1854–1925)

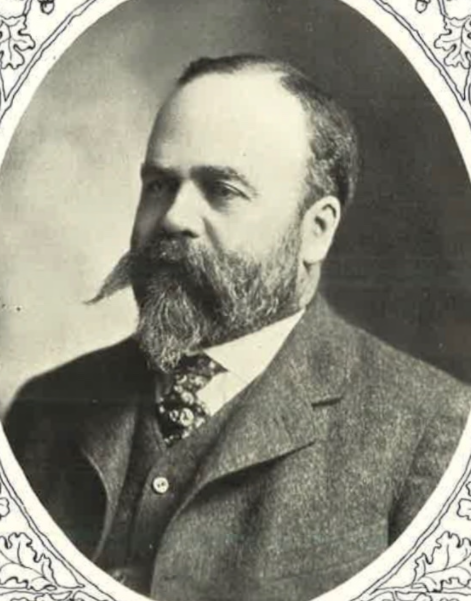
Christopher F. Parkhurst in 1904

Christopher Francis Parkhurst (sometimes referred to as C. Frank Parkhurst; September 17, 1854 – July 1, 1925) was an associate justice of the Rhode Island Supreme Court from 1905 to 1917 and chief justice from 1917 to 1920.

Born in Providence, Rhode Island, Parkhurst was a maternal descendant of Roger Williams. He graduated from Brown University in 1876.

From 1892 to 1895 he was a member of the Providence Common Council, and from 1900 to 1902 he served in the Rhode Island Senate. In April 1902, Parkhurst was appointed by the New York Supreme Court to act as ancillary receiver in bankruptcy for the Oriental Print Works Company, and in 1904, Parkhurst was designated by the Rhode Island Supreme Court to serve as master of chancery for considering claims by creditors against the American Tubing and Webbing Company.

On February 23, 1905, Parkhurst was elected by unanimous vote of the Rhode Island General Assembly to a seat on the Rhode Island Supreme Court, which had been vacated by the elevation of Justice William W. Douglas to the position of Chief Justice following the death of Pardon E. Tillinghast.

On March 9, 1917, the General Assembly elected Parkhurst Chief Justice, following the retirement of Chief Justice Clarke H. Johnson. Parkhurst resigned in 1920 due to poor health.

Parkhurst married Estelle Louise Eliot, with whom he had a son and a daughter. He died of bronchial pneumonia at his home in Providence at the age of 71.
