= William Anthony (judge) =

American judge (c. 1752–1832)

William Anthony (c. 1752 – September 6, 1832) was a justice of the Rhode Island Supreme Court from June 1809 to May 1810, and from May 1811 to May 1818.

Anthony was appointed to the court from Portsmouth, Rhode Island.

He lived to the age of 80, at which time he died what was reported to be a remarkably sudden death. One report noted: "At Portsmouth on the 6th inst, very suddenly, Hon. William Anthony, formerly for many years a Judge of the Supreme Judicial Court of this State, in the 81st year of his age". Another said: "His death was most remarkable and unexpected. He rode alone in his waggon to his daughter's, walked into the house, sat down in a chair—conversed awhile as usual, and then fell into a sleep to wake no more".
