= Paul Suttell =

American judge (born 1949)

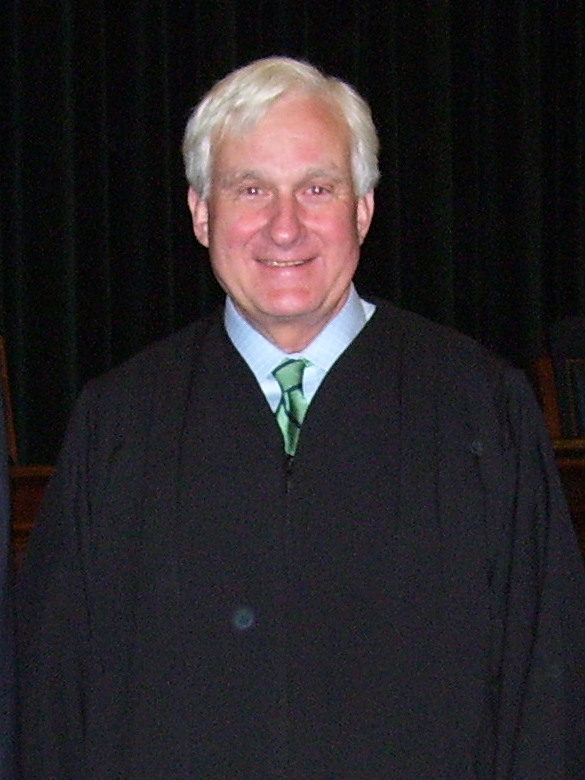

40th Chief Justice of the Rhode Island Supreme Court
- Incumbent
- Assumed office July 16, 2009
- Appointed by: Donald Carcieri
- Preceded by: Frank J. Williams

Associate Justice of the Rhode Island Supreme Court
- In office July 9, 2003 – July 16, 2009
- Appointed by: Donald Carcieri
- Preceded by: Victoria Lederberg
- Succeeded by: Gilbert V. Indeglia

Member of the Rhode Island House of Representatives
- In office 1983–1990

Personal details
- Born: January 10, 1949 (age 77) Providence, Rhode Island, U.S.
- Party: Republican
- Education: Northwestern University (BA); Suffolk University (JD)

Paul Allyn Suttell (born January 10, 1949) is the chief justice of the Rhode Island Supreme Court.

Suttell graduated from the Moses Brown School in Providence, Rhode Island. He then attended Northwestern University in Evanston, Illinois, from which he graduated in 1971. He received his J.D. degree from Suffolk University Law School in 1976.

He began his legal career in Pawtucket with the firm of Crowe, Chester & Adams, and then as an associate with Beals & DiFiore in Providence from 1978 to 1990. He served as legal counsel to the House Minority Leader in the Rhode Island House of Representatives from 1979 to 1982.

Suttell served in the Rhode Island House of Representatives between 1982 and 1990 as a member of the Republican Party, representing a district that encompassed Little Compton and portions of Tiverton and Portsmouth. In his second term, he was elected by his colleagues as Deputy Minority Leader and served in that capacity until 1990. During his tenure in the Rhode Island General Assembly, he served on the House Committees on the Judiciary, Corporations, and Special Legislation, the Joint Committees on the Environment and the Arts, and the Agricultural Land Preservation Commission, the Newport County Convention and Visitors Bureau, and the Lottery Commission. In 1988, he was elected as a delegate to the Republican National Convention in New Orleans.

On July 9, 1990, Suttell was appointed by Governor Edward D. DiPrete as an associate justice of the Rhode Island Family Court. During his time on the trial bench, he presided over the juvenile wayward and delinquency, child abuse and neglect, termination of parental rights, and domestic calendars.

After serving for thirteen years on the Rhode Island Family Court, Suttell was appointed by Governor Donald L. Carcieri as an associate justice of the Rhode Island Supreme Court on July 9, 2003. Governor Carcieri also appointed him as the chief justice of the Rhode Island Supreme Court effective July 16, 2009.

Suttell is a Little Compton, Rhode Island resident and serves on numerous community and nonprofit organizations. He was the moderator and former chairman of the Trustees of the Little Compton United Congregational Church and a past president of both the Little Compton Historical Society and Sakonnet Preservation Association. Currently, he is a director of the Historical Society.

Legal offices
Preceded by Frank J. Williams	Chief Justice of the Rhode Island Supreme Court; 2009–present	Incumbent
