= Charles F. Stearns =

American judge (1866–1946)

Charles Falconer Stearns (1866 – September 3, 1946) was an American judge. He was an associate justice of the Rhode Island Supreme Court from 1916 to 1929, and chief justice from 1929 to 1935.

Born in Central Falls, Rhode Island, to Henry Augustus Stearns and Kate Falconer Stearns, he received his undergraduate degree from Amherst College in 1889 and his law degree from Harvard Law School in 1893, gaining admission to the bar in Rhode Island that same year, and thereafter winning election to the Rhode Island Legislature. He served as Attorney General of Rhode Island from 1901 to 1905, and as a judge of the state superior court from 1906 until his appointment to the state supreme court in 1916.

Stearns was elevated to Chief Justice in 1929, but was ousted along with the rest of the court in 1935, when Democratic officials gained control of the state government.

In 1897, Stearns married Margaret C. Bucknell, but the marriage ended in divorce, and in 1904, Stearns married Amelia F. Lieber, who remained with him until his death. Stearns died in Providence, Rhode Island, at the age of 80.
