= Shearjashub Bourn =

American judge (1721–1781)

Shearjashub Bourn (April 18, 1721 – February 9, 1781) was an associate justice of the Rhode Island Supreme Court from August 1776 to May 1778, and chief justice from May 1778 until his death in 1781.

Bourn graduated from Harvard College in 1743 and moved from Sandwich, Massachusetts to Bristol, Rhode Island in 1745. He became a teacher while studying law, "in which profession he became distinguished, presiding several years as Chief Justice of the Supreme Court", where he remained until his death, at the age of 59.

He had a daughter and two sons, one of whom was Benjamin Bourne, appointed by President George Washington as a judge of the United States District Court for the District of Rhode Island.
