= Metcalf Bowler =

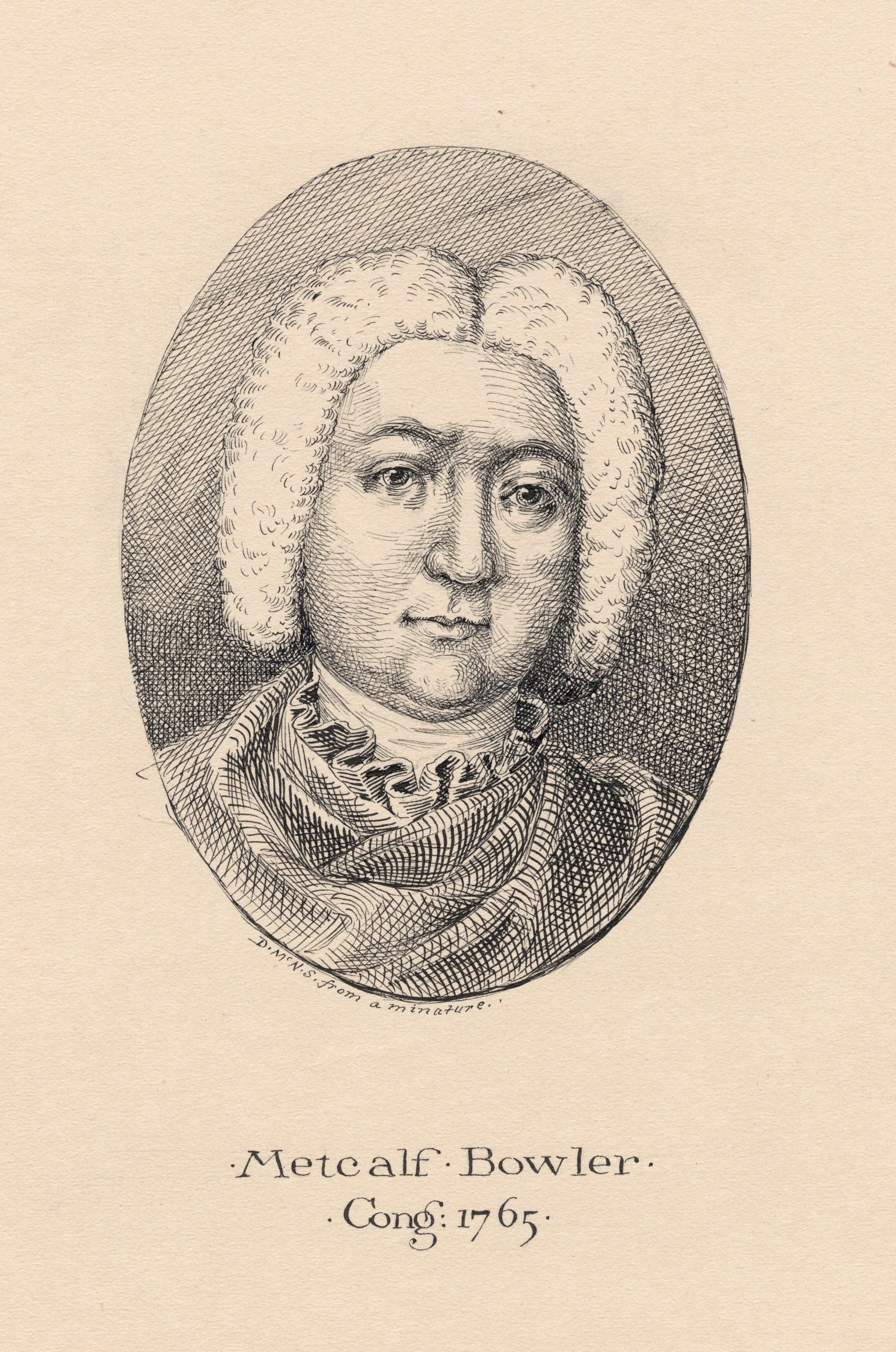
- Born: 1726; London, England
- Died: September 24, 1789 (aged 62–63); Providence, Rhode Island, US
- Burial place: St. John's Cemetery, Providence
- Occupations: Trader, Spy, Judge
- Spouse: Ann Fairchild Bowler

Metcalf Bowler (1726—September 24, 1789) was a Rhode Island merchant, politician, and magistrate. He was for many years speaker of the house in the Rhode Island colonial assembly, attended the 1754 Albany Congress, and was elected a delegate to the 1765 Stamp Act Congress. In 1776 he was appointed to the newly independent state's supreme court. A successful Atlantic merchant, he was financially ruined by the American Revolutionary War, and was in the 20th century revealed to be a paid informant for the British.

== Life ==
Metcalf Bowler was born in 1726 in London, England. In the 1740s he came with his father to North America, where he established himself in the Atlantic trade based in Newport, Rhode Island. His success in trade made him one of the Rhode Island colony's wealthiest men. He is frequently credited as being responsible for the introduction of the Rhode Island Greening apple as part of his merchant business and horticultural interests. He was supposedly responsible for its early propagation and distribution from his estate in Portsmouth. In 1750 he married Ann Fairchild, daughter of Major Fairchild, another prominent Newport merchant.

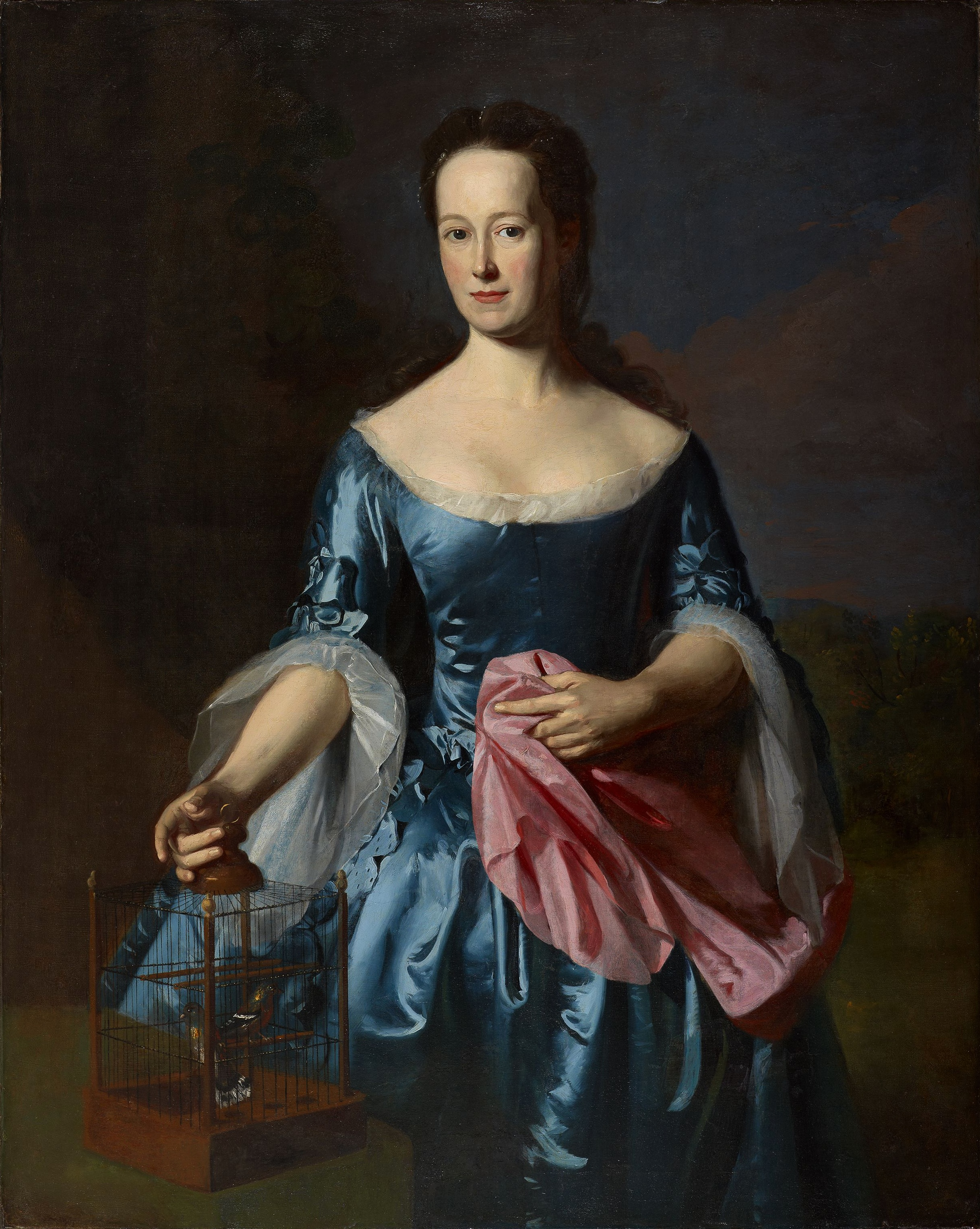
Portrait of Bowler's wife Ann by John Singleton Copley, c.1758

He attended one session of the 1754 Albany Congress, at which the idea of colonial union was discussed. During the French and Indian War at least one ship in which he had an interest, the Defiance was commissioned as a privateer. He was chosen to represent the colony at the Stamp Act Congress that met in October 1765 to formulate a united statement by the colonies against the provisions of the Stamp Act, the first attempt by the British Parliament to tax the colonies directly. He sat as a judge on the panel that investigated the Gaspée Affair.

Bowler was an officer in the Artillery Company of Newport, an independent organization in the Rhode Island Militia. He served as the company's ensign from 1756 to 1758, second lieutenant from 1758 to 1762 and as first lieutenant from 1762 to 1769.

He served for many years in the colonial assembly, and was its speaker from 1767 to 1776. He served as an associate justice of the Rhode Island Supreme Court from May 1768 to June 1769, and from June 1770 to August 1776, and as chief justice from August 1776 to February 1777. When Rhode Island declared its independence from Great Britain, Bowler was among the signatories. He remained active in state government, serving on its committee of secret correspondence. When the British occupied Newport in December 1776 Bowler was forced from his Portsmouth estate, and fled to Providence. There he operated a dry goods store and later a boarding house. He died in Providence in 1789, and is interred at St. John's Cemetery in Providence.

== Unmasked as informer ==
In the late 1920s, when an extensive cataloging of the papers of General Sir Henry Clinton was undertaken, correspondence was found in which Bowler was revealed to be a paid informer for the British at the same time that he was being hailed as an American Patriot. This change of heart was apparently made in an attempt to prevent the plundering of his properties in and around Newport following the British occupation. It is not known whether he gave the British any useful intelligence.

== See also ==
- Intelligence in the American Revolutionary War
- Intelligence operations in the American Revolutionary War
