= Gideon Comstock =

American judge (1709–1801)

Gideon Comstock (November 4, 1709 – 1801) was a Rhode Island politician and a justice of the Rhode Island Supreme Court from May 1766 to June 1767, from June 1769 to June 1770, and from May 1779 to May 1781.

Comstock was the son of Providence, Rhode Island native Hazadiah Comstock. Comstock himself lived at Smithfield, Providence and Cranston, Rhode Island. In 1734 he was admitted freeman at Smithfield, and May 3, 1748, he was allowed to vote in Providence. He served in the Rhode Island Legislature many times between 1758 and 1780, and in 1758 was elected assistant. In 1770 to 1771 he was deputy from Cranston. He was justice in the superior court from June 1769 to June 1770, and in the council of war, 1777 to 1778 and in 1780. On June 24, 1791, he deeded 160 acres in Smithfield to Arthur Fenner, who married Comstock's daughter.

Comstock was married three times, first to Ruth Arnold from March 3, 1738 to 1739; second to Freelove Arnold, widow of Josiah Arnold; and third to Amy, who died October 7, 1811, aged eighty-eight. Comstock died in 1801, aged ninety-two years.
