= Pardon E. Tillinghast =

American judge (1836–1905)

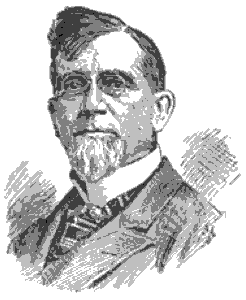

Justice of the Rhode Island Supreme Court
- In office 1891–1905

Personal details
- Born: Pardon Elisha Tillinghast; December 10, 1836 West Greenwich, Rhode Island
- Died: February 9, 1905 (aged 68) Pawtucket, Rhode Island
- Spouse: Ellen F. Paine (m. 1867)
- Children: 4
- Occupation: Jurist, politician

Pardon Elisha Tillinghast (December 10, 1836 – February 9, 1905) was a justice of the Rhode Island Supreme Court from 1891 to 1905, serving as chief justice from 1904 until his death.

== Biography ==
Pardon E. Tillinghast was born in West Greenwich, Rhode Island on December 10, 1836.

He married Ellen F. Paine on November 13, 1867, and they had four children.

Tillinghast served several terms in the Rhode Island General Assembly before he was elected judge of the Supreme Court in 1881. He served in the common pleas division until 1891, then entered the appellate division.

He died at his home in Pawtucket on February 9, 1905.
