= Rhode Island Supreme Court =

Highest court in the U.S. state of Rhode Island

Coordinates: 41°49′31″N 71°24′25″W

- Seal of the Rhode Island Judiciary

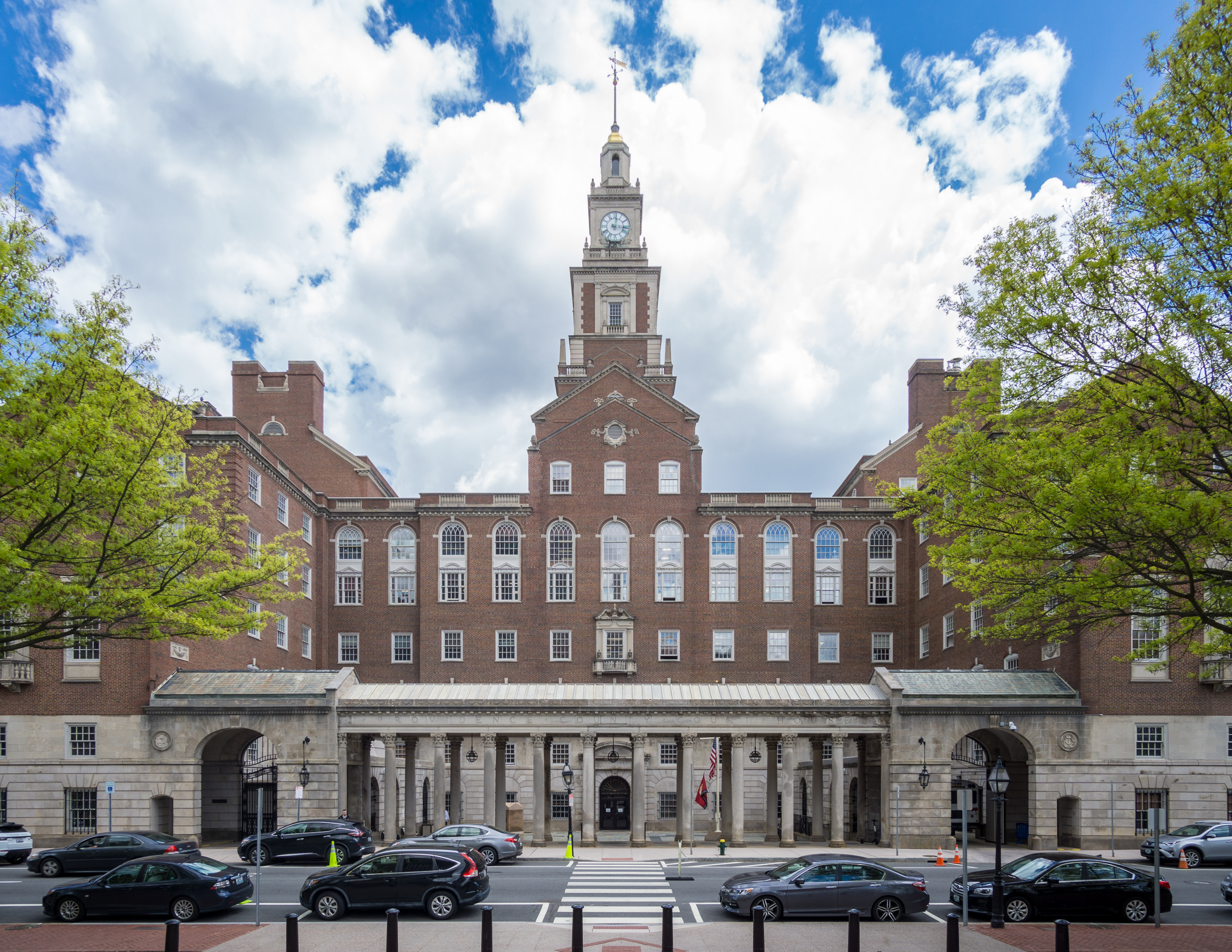
- The Providence County Courthouse
- Interactive map of Rhode Island Supreme Court
- Established: 1747 (colonial form) 1841, (current constitution)
- Jurisdiction: Rhode Island
- Location: Providence, Rhode Island
- Composition method: Appointment by governor, legislative consent
- Authorised by: Rhode Island Constitution
- Appeals to: Supreme Court of the United States
- Number of positions: 5
- Website: Official website

Chief Justice
- Currently: Paul Suttell
- Since: July 16, 2009

The Rhode Island Supreme Court is the court of last resort in the U.S. state of Rhode Island. The Court consists of a Chief Justice and four Associate Justices, all selected by the Governor of Rhode Island from candidates vetted by the Judicial Nominating Commission. Each justice enjoys lifetime tenure and no mandatory retirement age, similar to Federal judges. Justices may be removed only if impeached for improper conduct by a vote of the Rhode Island House of Representatives and convicted in an impeachment trial in the Rhode Island Senate.

== History ==
In 1747, the Rhode Island General Assembly authorized the creation of a Superior Court of Judicature, Court of Assize, and General Gaol Delivery, consisting of one chief justice and four associates, all serving one year terms. The 1747 enactment replaced an earlier appeals court of the same name, which had been composed of the governor or deputy governor and at least six of the elected "assistants," which dated to 1729 under the same name and the composition dated back to the 1663 charter when it was known as the "General Court of Trials." This court had replaced an even earlier court formed under the Charter of 1644, a 1647 enactment of a code of laws, and a 1651 amendment creating appellate jurisdiction.

Most of the judges during the 18th century were laymen, merchants or farmers and did not possess formal legal training, and therefore the court did not explicitly follow English common law. Parties, however, could still appeal to either the British monarch, English courts or the General Assembly until independence in 1776.

In 1747 the General Assembly appointed the first Chief Justice, Gideon Cornell, who was a judge, farmer, and merchant, and the second, Joshua Babcock, a Yale-educated physician. Stephen Hopkins, later signatory of the Declaration of Independence, served as the third Chief Justice from 1747 to 1755.

In 1798, the General Assembly renamed the Court the "Supreme Judicial Court," and in 1843, the "Supreme Court." The first officially recorded decision was Stoddard v. Martin, 1 R.I. 1 (1828), a case involving gambling on an election. Since 1930, the Court has been located within the Licht Judicial Complex at the base of College Hill in Providence, Rhode Island. Until 1994, the General Assembly sitting with both houses in "Grand Committee" chose the Supreme Court justices without the governor's consent. In 1994, after a wave of corruption scandals, citizens amended the Rhode Island Constitution to allow the governor to choose Supreme Court nominees from a list of candidates approved by a non-partisan nominating committee. Both houses of the General Assembly still must approve any nominees.

== Current justices ==
Name	Born	Start	Appointer	Law school
Paul Suttell, Chief Justice	January 10, 1949 (age 77)	July 9, 2003 (Note: Took office as Chief Justice on July 16, 2009.)	Donald Carcieri (R)	Suffolk
William P. Robinson III	January 30, 1940 (age 86)	September 7, 2004	Donald Carcieri (R)	BC
Erin Lynch Prata	May 17, 1975 (age 51)	January 4, 2021	Gina Raimondo (D)	CUA
Melissa A. Long	1970 or 1971 (age 55–56)	January 11, 2021	Gina Raimondo (D)	GMU
Vacant		March 27, 2026		

=== Vacancy and pending nomination ===
Vacator	Reason	Vacancy Date	Nominee	Nomination Date
Maureen McKenna Goldberg	Retirement	March 27, 2026	Luis Matos	August 12, 2026

== Notable cases ==
- Stoddard v. Martin (1828) first case recorded in the official reports of the Rhode Island Supreme Court.
- Trevett v. Weeden (1786), (involving the legitimacy of paper money) was one of the first cases where a state court held a legislative act unconstitutional, setting precedent for Marbury v. Madison.
- Angel v. Murray, 113 R.I. 482, 322 A.2d 630 (1974), which was the first case to apply the UCC's reasoning on contract modification to service contracts. The rule states that a contract does not always need additional consideration for modification, provided certain conditions are present.
- Picard v. Barry Pontiac-Buick, Inc., 654 A.2d 690 (R.I. 1995), a tort case, which is often used as an example of battery in tort textbooks.

== Notable justices ==
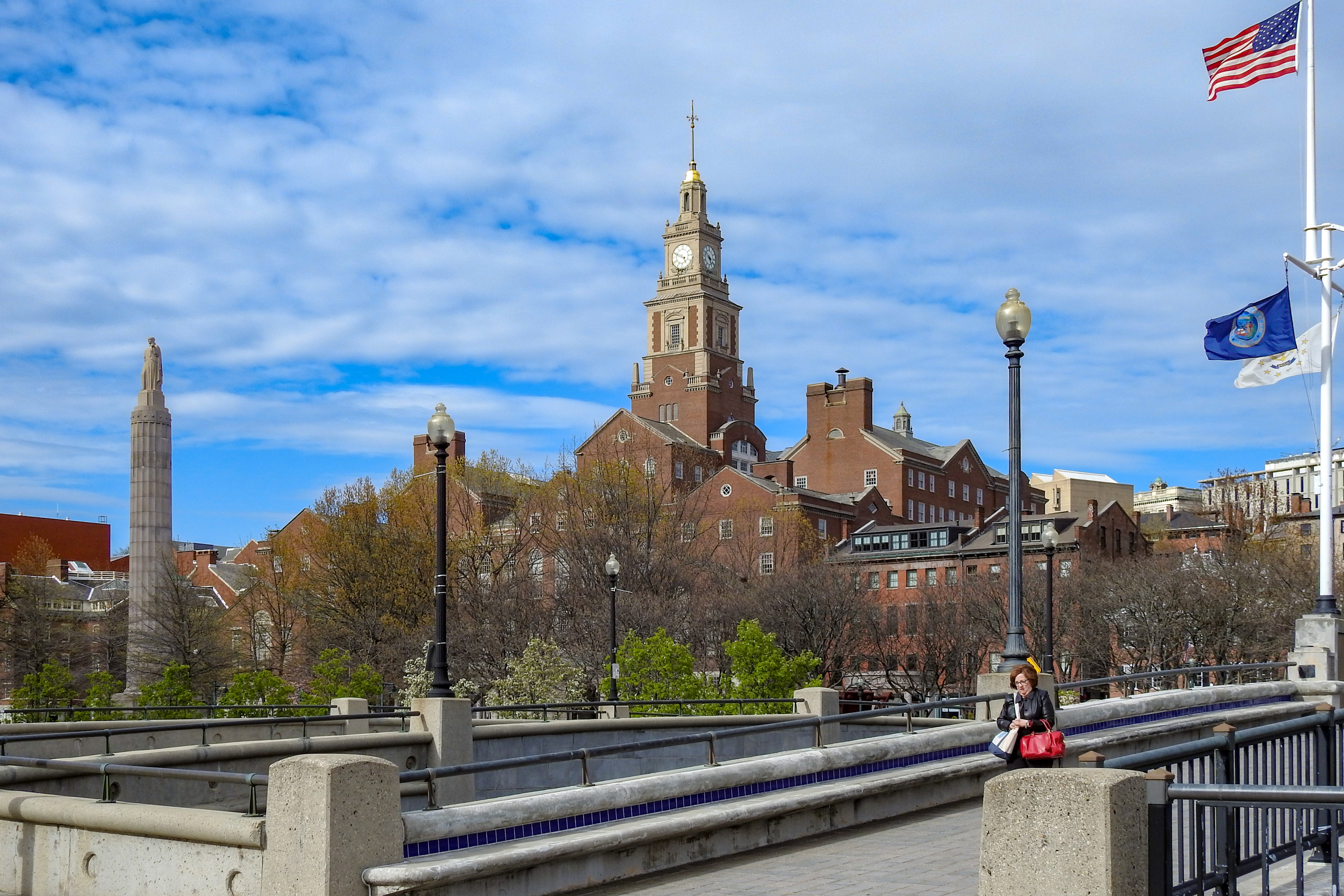
The court currently convenes in the Providence County Courthouse

- Peleg Arnold, Delegate to the Continental Congress
- Joshua Babcock, physician, friend of Benjamin Franklin
- Charles S. Bradley, former partner at Tillinghast & Bradley
- William Ellery, Signatory of the Declaration of Independence
- Stephen Hopkins, Signatory of the Declaration of Independence, Governor of Rhode Island
- David Howell, Delegate to the Continental Congress, Federalist leader, U.S. District Judge
- Christopher Lippitt, American Revolution officer under George Washington
- Daniel Lyman, member of the secessionist Hartford Convention of 1814
- Samuel Ward, Delegate to the Continental Congress, Governor
- William West, 1787–1789, American Revolution general, Deputy Governor, Anti-Federalist rebellion leader

== Chief justices ==
A few noted Chief Justices of the Rhode Island Supreme Court include:

- Joshua Babcock
- Stephen Hopkins
- Samuel Ward
- John Gardner
- Peleg Arnold
- Daniel Lyman
- Paul A. Suttell

== Images ==
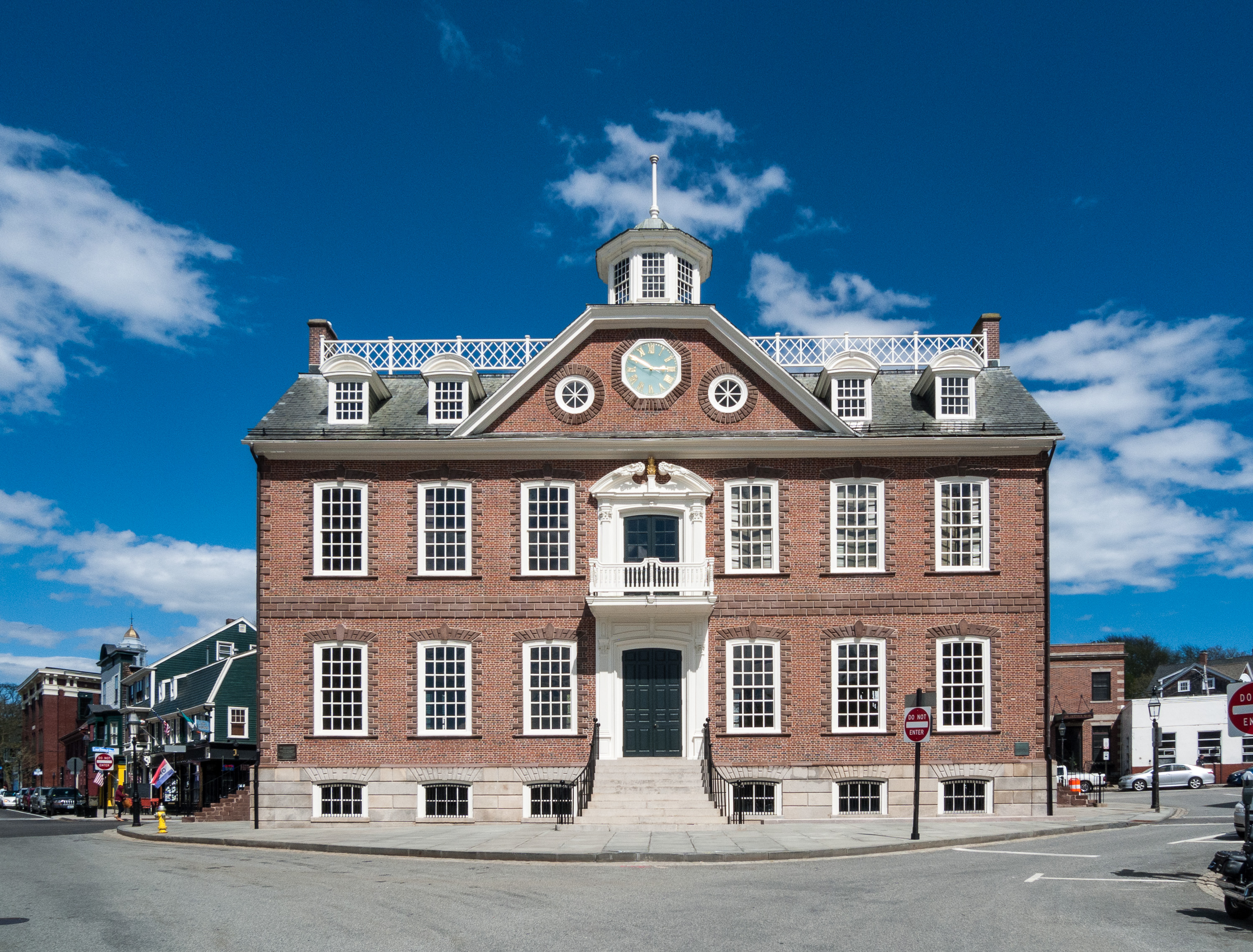
The 18th Century Newport Colony House was an early meeting place of the Court

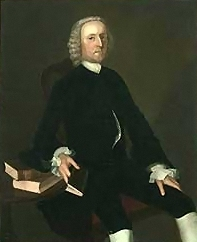
Dr. Joshua Babcock was the 2nd and 10th Chief Justice of the Rhode Island Supreme Court

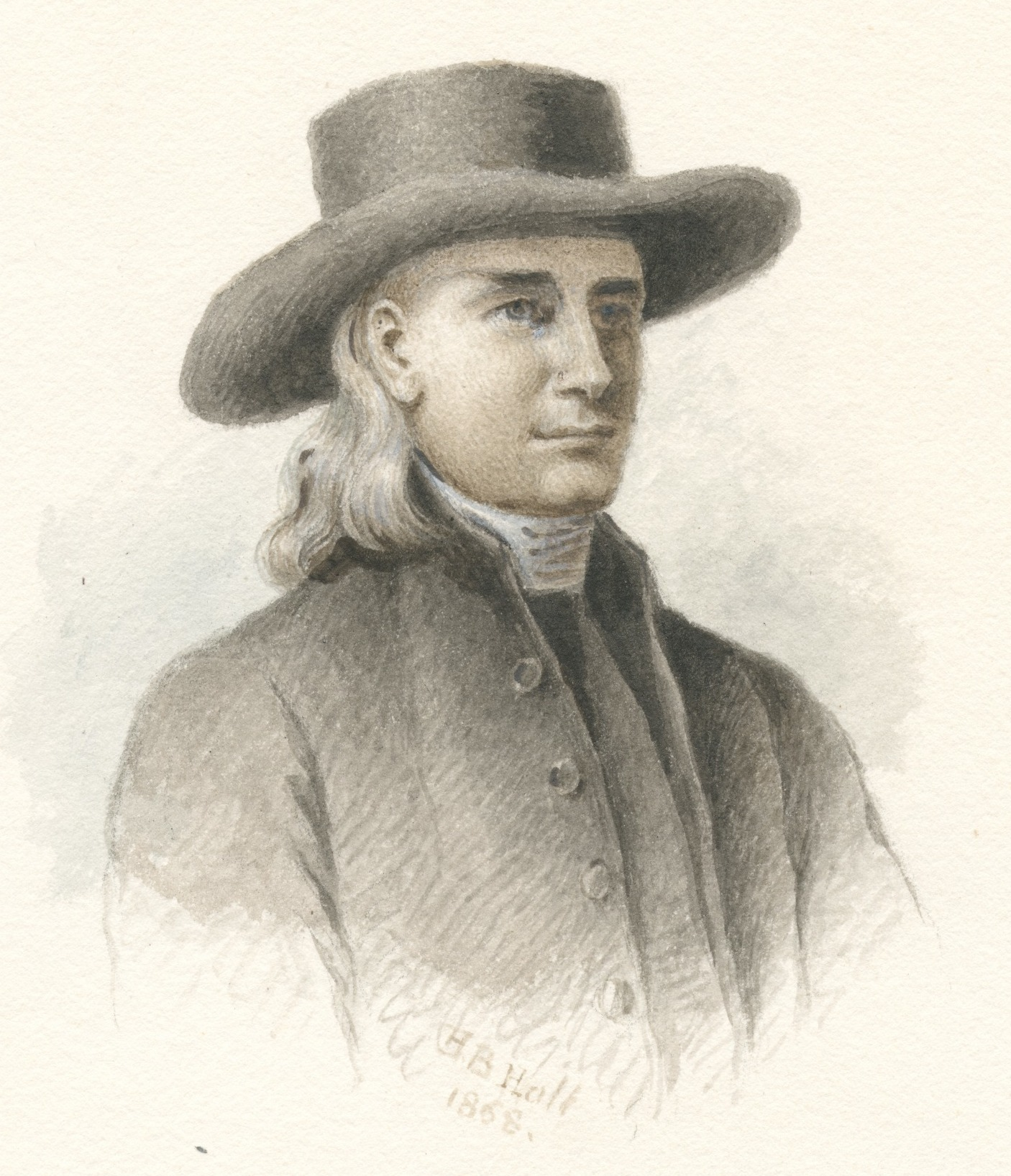
3rd Chief Justice, Stephen Hopkins, later signed the Declaration of Independence

== See also ==
- Rhode Island Bar Association
