= List of speakers of the Rhode Island House of Representatives =

Speaker of the Rhode Island House of Representatives
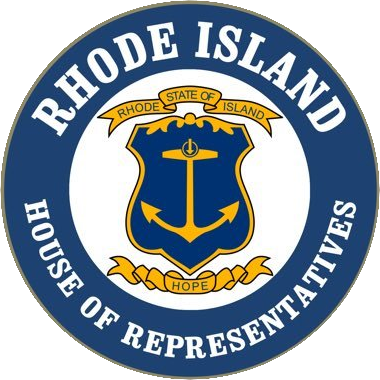
- Seal of the House of Representatives
- Incumbent; Christopher Blazejewski since May 7, 2026
- Government of Rhode Island
- Status: Presiding Officer
- Member of: General Assembly
- Constituting instrument: Rhode Island Constitution
- Inaugural holder: Jonathan Holmes
- Formation: Original Post: 1696; Current form: 1843

The speaker of the Rhode Island House of Representatives is the highest official in the Rhode Island House of Representatives.

== History ==
From 1663 until 1842, Rhode Island's governing state constitution was its original colonial charter granted by King Charles II of England, a political anomaly considering that while most states during the War of Independence and afterwards wrote scores of new constitutions with their newly found independence in mind, Rhode Island instead continued with a document stamped by an English king. By the 1840s, Rhode Island was the only state whose official legal document was passed by a foreign monarch and the document essentially restricted voting rights to a very small population of elite, rural, landowning native-born white males.

In September 1842, a Constitutional Convention was held at the Colony House in Newport to confront the issue of expanding suffrage. When the constitution was put to a public vote in November 1842, voters rejected that voting rights should be restricted to whites only by a three to one margin, thus making Rhode Island the first state to grant suffrage to African-Americans. The new constitution was ratified and the constitution became effective in May 1843.

=== Selection ===
The Speaker of the House presides over the House of Representatives. The Speaker is elected by the majority party caucus followed by confirmation of the full House through the passage of a House Resolution. As well as presiding over the body, the Speaker is also the chief leadership position, and controls the flow of legislation.

== List of speakers ==
=== Colonial period ===
Note: (Note: Prior to 1696, the House of Deputies was organized by the election of the Governor or Deputy Governor as moderator of the body, with the Governor often performing the duties. A speaker was first chosen in 1696 and the title of "Deputies" was changed to "Representatives" in June 1797.)

Speaker	Took office	Left office	Party	Notes
Jonathan Holmes	Oct. 1696	Oct. 1698		
Joseph Jenckes Jr.	Oct. 1698	Feb. 1699		Founder of Pawtucket, Rhode Island; his son, Joseph, became the Colony's governor
Benjamin Newberry	Feb. 1699	Apr. 1700		
Jonathan Holmes	Apr. 1700	May 1703		
Benjamin Barton	Oct. 1703	May 1704		
John Rogers	May 1704	Oct. 1704		
John Dexter	Oct. 1704	May 1705		
William Wanton	May 1705	May 1706		Also served as Governor of the Colony of Rhode Island from 1732 to 1733; brother to John Wanton
Benjamin Arnold	May 1706	Feb. 1707		
John Wanton	Feb. 1707	May 1707		Also served as Governor of the Colony of Rhode Island from 1734 to 1740; brother to William Wanton
Joseph Jenckes	May 6, 1707	May 28, 1707		Also served as Governor of the Colony of Rhode Island from 1727 to 1732
James Greene	May 1707	Oct. 1707		
Richard Arnold	Oct. 1707	May 1708		
Joseph Jenckes	May 1708	Oct. 1708		Also served as Governor of the Colony of Rhode Island from 1727 to 1732
William Wanton	Oct. 1708	May 1709		Also served as Governor of the Colony of Rhode Island from 1732 to 1733; brother to John Wanton
Simon Smith	May 1709	Oct. 1709		
Abraham Anthony	Oct. 1709	May 1710		
John Wanton	May 1710	Oct. 1710		Also served as Governor of the Colony of Rhode Island from 1734 to 1740; brother to William Wanton
William Wanton	Oct. 1710	Nov. 1711		Also served as Governor of the Colony of Rhode Island from 1732 to 1733; brother to John Wanton
James Green	Nov. 1711	Feb. 1712		
John Spencer	Feb. 1712	May 1712		
Ebenezer Slocum	May 1712	May 1713		
John Wanton	May 1713	Oct. 1713		Also served as Governor of the Colony of Rhode Island from 1734 to 1740; brother to William Wanton
Thomas Frye	Oct. 1713	Oct. 1714		Also served as Governor of the Colony of Rhode Island from 1727 to 1729
Randall Holden Jr.	Oct. 1714	May 1715		Son of Randall Holden, co-founder of Portsmouth and Warwick
William Wanton	May 1715	Oct. 1715		Also served as Governor of the Colony of Rhode Island from 1732 to 1733; brother to John Wanton
William Hopkins	Oct. 1715	May 1716		Nephew of Benedict Arnold, 1st Governor of the Colony of Rhode Island
John Cranston Jr.	May 1716	Oct. 1716		
William Wanton	Oct. 1716	Oct. 1717		Also served as Governor of the Colony of Rhode Island from 1732 to 1733; brother to John Wanton
Thomas Frye	Oct. 1717	May 1718		Also served as Governor of the Colony of Rhode Island from 1727 to 1729
William Wanton	May 1718	Oct. 1718		Also served as Governor of the Colony of Rhode Island from 1732 to 1733; brother to John Wanton
Nathaniel Sheffield	Oct. 1718	May 1719		
William Wanton	May 1719	May 1722		Also served as Governor of the Colony of Rhode Island from 1732 to 1733; brother to John Wanton
Thomas Frye	May 1722	Oct. 1722		Also served as Governor of the Colony of Rhode Island from 1727 to 1729
William Coddington III	Oct. 1722	Feb. 1723		Nephew of William Coddington Jr. and grandson of William Coddington, both Governors of the Colony of Rhode Island
William Wanton	Feb. 1723	May 1724		Also served as Governor of the Colony of Rhode Island from 1732 to 1733; brother to John Wanton
William Coddington III	May 5, 1724	May 6, 1724		Nephew of William Coddington Jr. and grandson of William Coddington, both Governors of the Colony of Rhode Island
Thomas Frye	May 1724	Oct. 1724		Also served as Governor of the Colony of Rhode Island from 1727 to 1729
William Coddington III	Oct. 1724	Oct. 1725		Nephew of William Coddington Jr. and grandson of William Coddington, both Governors of the Colony of Rhode Island
Thomas Frye	Oct. 1725	May 1726		Also served as Governor of the Colony of Rhode Island from 1727 to 1729
William Coddington III	May 1726	Oct. 1726		Nephew of William Coddington Jr. and grandson of William Coddington, both Governors of the Colony of Rhode Island
Jeremiah Gould	Oct. 1726	Aug. 1727		
Thomas Frye	Aug. 1727	Oct. 1727		Also served as Governor of the Colony of Rhode Island from 1727 to 1729
Job Greene	Oct. 1727	Apr. 1728		
Henry Bull	Apr. 1728	May 1729		Also served as Attorney General of Rhode Island from 1721 to 1722; was a great-grandson of Governor Henry Bull
Samuel Clarke	May 1729	Oct. 1729		
Thomas Frye	Oct. 1729	May 1730		Also served as Governor of the Colony of Rhode Island from 1727 to 1729
Samuel Clarke	May 1730	Oct. 1732		
George Hazard	Oct. 1732	May 1733		Also served as Governor of the Colony of Rhode Island from 1734 to 1738; father of Carder Hazard and cousin of Robert Hazard
Jeremiah Gould	May 1733	Jun. 1733		
George Hazard	Jun. 1733	Jul. 1733		Also served as Governor of the Colony of Rhode Island from 1734 to 1738; father of Carder Hazard and cousin of Robert Hazard
Jeremiah Gould	Jul. 1733	Oct. 1733		
Samuel Clarke	Oct. 1733	May 1734		
Henry Bull	Apr. 30, 1734	May 5, 1734		Also served as Attorney General of Rhode Island from 1721 to 1722; was a great-grandson of Governor Henry Bull
William Greene	May 1734	Oct. 1734		Also served as Governor of the Colony of Rhode Island in 1743, serving four separate terms for a total of 11 years; father of William Greene
Samuel Clarke	Oct. 1734	Oct. 1735		
William Robinson	Oct. 1735	May 1736		Also served as Deputy Governor of Rhode Island from 1745 to 1746 and 1747 to 1748
Francis Willett	May 1736	Oct. 1736		
Samuel Clarke	Oct. 1736	May 1737		
Francis Willett	May 1737	Oct. 1737		
Daniel Abbott	Oct. 1737	May 1738		Also served as Deputy Governor of Rhode Island from 1738 to 1740
Thomas Spenser	May 1738	Oct. 1738		
Stephen Hopkins	Oct. 1738	May 1739		Founding Father of the United States, also served as Governor and Chief Justice of the Rhode Island Supreme Court, and a signer of the Continental Association and Declaration of Independence
Francis Willett	May 1739	Jul. 1739		
William Greene	Jul. 1739	Oct. 1739		Also served as Governor of the Colony of Rhode Island in 1743, serving four separate terms for a total of 11 years; father of William Greene
Stephen Hopkins	Oct. 1739	May 1740		Founding Father of the United States, also served as Governor and Chief Justice of the Rhode Island Supreme Court, and a signer of the Continental Association and Declaration of Independence
Samuel Clarke	May 1740	May 1741		
Stephen Hopkins	May 1741	Jun. 1741		Founding Father of the United States, also served as Governor and Chief Justice of the Rhode Island Supreme Court, and a signer of the Continental Association and Declaration of Independence
Joseph Whipple	Jun. 1741	Aug. 1741		Also served as Deputy Governor of Rhode Island from 1743 to 1745 and 1746 to 1747; son of Col. Joseph Whipple
Stephen Hopkins	Aug. 1741	Oct. 1741		Founding Father of the United States, also served as Governor and Chief Justice of the Rhode Island Supreme Court, and a signer of the Continental Association and Declaration of Independence
William Robinson	Oct. 1741	Oct. 1742		Also served as Deputy Governor of Rhode Island from 1745 to 1746 and 1747 to 1748
Stephen Hopkins	Oct. 1742	May 1743		Founding Father of the United States, also served as Governor and Chief Justice of the Rhode Island Supreme Court, and a signer of the Continental Association and Declaration of Independence
John Potter	May 1743	Oct. 1743		
Joseph Stafford	Oct. 1743	May 1744		
Stephen Hopkins	May 1744	Nov. 1744		Founding Father of the United States, also served as Governor and Chief Justice of the Rhode Island Supreme Court, and a signer of the Continental Association and Declaration of Independence
Peter Bours	Nov. 1744	Oct. 1746		
Jeremiah Niles	Oct. 1746	Feb. 1747		
Samuel Wickham	Feb. 1747	Oct. 1747		
Daniel Jencks	Oct. 1747	Oct. 1748		
Thomas Cranston	Oct. 1748	May 1749		Also served as Justice of the Rhode Island Supreme Court from 1762 to 1764
Stephen Hopkins	May 1749	Aug. 1749		Founding Father of the United States, also served as Governor and Chief Justice of the Rhode Island Supreme Court, and a signer of the Continental Association and Declaration of Independence
Joshua Babcock	Aug. 1749	May 1750		Also served as Chief Justice of the Rhode Island Supreme Court in 1763 and from 1749 to 1751
Thomas Cranston	May 1750	May 1757		Also served as Justice of the Rhode Island Supreme Court from 1762 to 1764
Benjamin Wickham	May 1757	Oct. 1757		
Peter Bours	Oct. 1757	May 1759		
Joshua Babcock	May 1759	Oct. 1759		Also served as Chief Justice of the Rhode Island Supreme Court in 1763 and from 1749 to 1751
Job Randal	Oct. 1759	May 1760		
Thomas Cranston	May 1760	May 1762		Also served as Justice of the Rhode Island Supreme Court from 1762 to 1764
Daniel Aryault Jr.	May 1762	Oct. 1762		
Philip Greene	Oct. 1762	May 1763		
John Dexter	May 1763	May 1764		
Daniel Aryault	May 1764	Oct. 1764		
William Bradford	Oct. 1764	Oct. 1765	Federalist	Also served as U.S. Senator from 1793 to 1797 and Deputy Governor of Rhode Island from 1775 to 1778
Richard Bailey	Oct. 1765	May 1766		
William Bradford	May 1766	May 1767	Federalist	Also served as U.S. Senator from 1793 to 1797 and Deputy Governor of Rhode Island from 1775 to 1778
John Cole	May 1767	Feb. 1768		Also served as Chief Justice of the Rhode Island Supreme Court from 1764 to 1765
Metcalf Bowler	Feb. 1768	Nov. 1776		Also served as justice of the Rhode Island Supreme Court from 1768 to 1769, 1770 to 1776, and as Chief Justice from 1776 to 1777

=== Revolutionary War to Present ===
Speaker	Took office	Left office	Party	Notes
William Greene	Nov. 1776	May 1778		Also served as 2nd Governor of Rhode Island 1778 to 1786 and Chief Justice of the Rhode Island Supreme Court from 1777 to 1778; son of William Greene
Joshua Babcock	May 1778	Sep. 1778		Also served as Chief Justice of the Rhode Island Supreme Court in 1763 and from 1749 to 1751
Stephen Potter	Sep. 1778	May 1779		Also served as Justice of the Rhode Island Supreme Court from 1764 to 1765, 1767 to 1768, and 1779 to 1780
Othniel Gorton	May 1779	May 1780		Also served as Chief Justice of the Rhode Island Supreme Court from 1788 to 1791
William Bradford	May 1780	Jun. 1780	Federalist	Also served as U.S. Senator from 1793 to 1797 and Deputy Governor of Rhode Island from 1775 to 1778
Welcome Arnold	Jun. 1780	Jul. 1780		
William Bradford	Jul. 1780	Oct. 1786	Federalist	Also served as U.S. Senator from 1793 to 1797 and Deputy Governor of Rhode Island from 1775 to 1778
Othniel Gorton	Oct. 1786	Oct. 1788		Also served as Chief Justice of the Rhode Island Supreme Court from 1788 to 1791
Joseph Stanton Jr.	Oct. 1788	Oct. 1789	Anti-Administration	Also served as U.S. Senator from 1790 to 1793 and U.S. Representative from Rhode Island's at-large district from 1801 to 1807
William Bradford	Oct. 1789	May 1790	Federalist	Also served as U.S. Senator from 1793 to 1797 and Deputy Governor of Rhode Island from 1775 to 1778
Joseph Stanton Jr.	May 1790	Oct. 1790	Anti-Administration	Also served as U.S. Senator from 1790 to 1793 and U.S. Representative from Rhode Island's at-large district from 1801 to 1807
Welcome Arnold	Oct. 1790	May 1791		
William Bradford	May 1791	May 1793	Federalist	Also served as U.S. Senator from 1793 to 1797 and Deputy Governor of Rhode Island from 1775 to 1778
Welcome Arnold	May 1793	May 1795		
Joseph Stanton Jr.	May 1795	Oct. 1795	Anti-Administration	Also served as U.S. Senator from 1790 to 1793 and U.S. Representative from Rhode Island's at-large district from 1801 to 1807
Elisha Reynolds Potter	Oct. 1795	Feb. 1797	Federalist	Also served as U.S. Representative from Rhode Island's at-large district from 1796 to 1797 and 1809 to 1815; father of U.S. Representative Elisha R. Potter
Joseph Stanton Jr.	Feb. 1797	May 1797	Anti-Administration	Also served as U.S. Senator from 1790 to 1793 and U.S. Representative from Rhode Island's at-large district from 1801 to 1807
George Champlin	May 1797	Oct. 1798		
William Bradford	Oct. 1798	May 1802	Federalist	Also served as U.S. Senator from 1793 to 1797 and Deputy Governor of Rhode Island from 1775 to 1778
Elisha Reynolds Potter	May 1802	Oct. 1802	Federalist	Also served as U.S. Representative from Rhode Island's at-large district from 1796 to 1797 and 1809 to 1815; father of U.S. Representative Elisha R. Potter
Constant Taber	Oct. 1802	Oct. 1805		
Isaac Wilbour	Oct. 1805	May 1806	Democratic-Republican	Also served as Governor of Rhode Island from 1806 to 1807, U.S. Representative from Rhode Island's at-large district from 1807 to 1809, Chief Justice of the Rhode Island Supreme Court from 1819 to 1827
Elisha Reynolds Potter	May 1806	Feb. 1809	Federalist	Also served as U.S. Representative from Rhode Island's at-large district from 1796 to 1797 and 1809 to 1815; father of U.S. Representative Elisha R. Potter
William Jones	May 1809	May 1810	Federalist	Also served as Governor of Rhode Island from 1811 to 1817
Nathaniel Hazard	May 1810	Oct. 1810	Democratic-Republican	Also served as U.S. Representative from Rhode Island's at-large district from 1819 to 1820
William Jones	Oct. 1810	May 1811	Federalist	Also served as Governor of Rhode Island from 1811 to 1817
William Hunter	May 1811	Feb. 1812	Federalist	Also served as U.S. Senator from 1811 to 1821, U.S. Chargé d'Affaires/Minister to Brazil from 1835 to 1843
James B. Mason	Feb. 1812	May 1814	Federalist	Also served as U.S. Representative from Rhode Island's at-large district from 1815 to 1819
James Burrill Jr.	May 1814	Oct. 1816	Federalist	Also served as U.S. Senator from 1817 to 1820, Chief Justice of the Rhode Island Supreme Court from 1816 to 1817, Attorney General of Rhode Island from 1797 to 1814
Benjamin Hazard	Oct. 1816	May 1818		
Nathaniel Hazard	May 1818	May 1819	Democratic-Republican	Also served as U.S. Representative from Rhode Island's at-large district from 1819 to 1820
James DeWolf	May 1819	May 1821	Federalist	Also served as U.S. Senator from 1821 to 1825
Elisha Mathewson	May 1821	Oct. 1821	Democratic-Republican	Also served as U.S. Senator from 1807 to 1811
Albert C. Greene	Oct. 1821	May 1822	Whig	Also served as U.S. Senator from 1845 to 1851 and Attorney General of Rhode Island from 1825 to 1843
Elisha Mathewson	May 1822	Oct. 1822	Democratic-Republican	Also served as U.S. Senator from 1807 to 1811
Albert C. Greene	Oct. 1822	May 1825	Whig	Also served as U.S. Senator from 1845 to 1851 and Attorney General of Rhode Island from 1825 to 1843
Nathaniel Bullock	May 1825	May 1826	Democratic-Republican	Also served as Lt. Gov. of Rhode Island from 1842 to 1843
Samuel W. Bridgham	May 1826	Oct. 1826	Whig	Also served as Attorney General of Rhode Island from 1814 to 1817 and Mayor of Providence from 1832 to 1840
Nathan B. Sprague	Oct. 1826	Oct. 1827		
Job Durfee	Oct. 1827	May 1829	Democratic-Republican	Also served as U.S. Representative from Rhode Island's at-large district from 1821 to 1825 and Chief Justice of the Rhode Island Supreme Court from 1835 to 1847; father of Thomas Durfee
Joseph L. Tillinghast	May 1829	Oct. 1832	Whig	Also served as U.S. Representative from Rhode Island's at-large district from 1837 to 1843
William Sprague III	Oct. 1832	May 1835	Whig	Also served as U.S. Senator from 1842 to 1844 and U.S. Representative from Rhode Island's at-large district from 1835 to 1837 and Governor of Rhode Island from 1838 to 1839
Henry Y. Cranston	May 1835	Oct. 1835	Law and Order, Whig	Also served in U.S. House of Representatives from the 1st district from 1843 to 1847
Christopher Allen	Oct. 1835	Oct. 1836		
Samuel Y. Atwell	Oct. 1836	Oct. 1837		
George Curtis	Oct. 1837	May 1839		Also served as President of the Continental Bank of New York
Henry Y. Cranston	May 1839	May 1841	Law and Order, Whig	Also served in U.S. House of Representatives from the 1st district from 1843 to 1847
Charles Jackson	May 1841	May 1842	Whig	Also served as Governor of Rhode Island from 1845 to 1846
Richard K. Randolph	May 1842	Oct. 1842		
Alfred Bosworth	Oct. 1842	May 1844	Whig	Also served as Justice of the Rhode Island Supreme Court from 1854 to 1862
Samuel Ames	May 1844	May 1845	Law and Order, Whig	Also served as Chief Justice of the Rhode Island Supreme Court from 1856 to 1865
George Gordon King	May 1845	May 1846	Whig	Also served in U.S. House of Representatives from the 1st district from 1849 to 1853
Robert B. Cranston	May 1846	May 1847		Also served in U.S. House of Representatives from the 1st district from 1847 to 1849 and from Rhode Island's at-large district from 1837 to 1843
William S. Patten	May 1847	May 1848		
Sylvester G. Shearman	May 1848	May 1849		
James C. Hidden	May 1849	May 1851		
Alfred Bosworth	May 1851	May 1853	Whig	Also served as Justice of the Rhode Island Supreme Court from 1854 to 1862
Thomas Steere	May 1853	Jan. 1854		
Benjamin F. Thurston	Jan. 1854	May 1854		
Henry Y. Cranston	May 1854	May 1855	Law and Order, Whig	Also served in U.S. House of Representatives from the 1st district from 1843 to 1847
Benjamin Fessenden	May 1855	May 1856		
Benjamin F. Thurston	May 1856	May 1857		
Sullivan Ballou	May 1857	May 1858	Republican	Also served as a Major in the 2nd Rhode Island Infantry
Charles C. Van Zandt	May 1858	May 1859	Republican	Also served as Governor of Rhode Island from 1877 to 1880
Wingate Hayes	May 1859	May 1860		Also served as U.S. Attorney for the District of Rhode Island from 1861 to 1871
Caesar A. Updike	May 1860	May 1862		
Francis W. Miner	May 1862	May 1863		
Thomas Durfee	May 1863	May 1864		Also served as Chief Justice of the Rhode Island Supreme Court from 1875 to 1891; son of Job Durfee
Benjamin F. Thurston	May 1864	Jan. 1865		
Alexander Farnum	Jan. 1865	May 1865		
George L. Clarke	May 1865	May 1866	Republican	Mayor of Providence, Rhode Island from 1869 to 1870
Charles C. Van Zandt	May 1866	May 1869	Republican	Also served as Governor of Rhode Island from 1877 to 1880
Benjamin T. Eames	May 1869	May 1870	Republican	Also served in U.S. House of Representatives from the 1st district
Amos Barstow	May 1870	May 1871	Whig	Mayor of Providence, Rhode Island from 1852 to 1853
Charles C. Van Zandt	May 1871	May 1873	Republican	Also served as Governor of Rhode Island from 1877 to 1880
Edwin Metcalf	1873	1874		Also served as Attorney General of Rhode Island
Edward L. Freeman	1874	1876		
Nelson W. Aldrich	1876	1877	Republican	Also served as a U.S. Senator and in U.S. House of Representatives from the 1st district
Dexter B. Potter	1877	1879		President of the Providence Telephone Co.
Henry J. Spooner	1879	1881	Republican	Also served in U.S. House of Representatives from the 1st district
John P. Sanborn	1881	1882		
Francello G. Jillson	1883	1885		
Ellery H. Wilson	1885	1887		
Charles E. Gorman	1887	1888		
George H. Utter	1888	1889	Republican	Also served as Governor of Rhode Island, Lt. Gov. of Rhode Island, Secretary of State of Rhode Island, in the U.S. House from the 2nd district, and in the Rhode Island Senate
Augustus S. Miller	1889	1891	Democratic	Mayor of Providence, Rhode Island from 1903 to 1905
Adin B. Capron	1891	1893	Republican	Also served in U.S. House of Representatives from the 2nd district
Franklin P. Owen	1893	1894		
Samuel W. K. Allen	1894	1897		
J. Edward Studley	1897	1898		
Frank E. Holden	1898	1901		
James H. Armington	1901	1903		
Joseph P. Burlingame	1903	1906		
Arthur W. Dennis	1906	1907	Republican	Lieutenant Governor of Rhode Island from 1909 to 1910
Roswell B. Burchard	1907	1911		
William C. Bliss	1911	1912	Republican	
Ambrose Kennedy	1912	1913	Republican	Also served in U.S. House of Representatives from the 3rd district
Frank F. Davis	1913	1915	Republican	
Frank H. Hammill	1915	1919	Republican	
Arthur P. Summer	1919	1920	Republican	
William R. Fortin	1920	1923	Republican	
Philip C. Joslin	1923	1927	Republican	
Roy Willard Rawlings	1927	1933	Republican	Father of Rob Roy Rawlings and Lucy Rawlings Tootell
William E. Reddy	1933	1937	Democratic	
James H. Kiernan	1937	1939	Democratic	
Hugo A. Clason	1939	1941	Republican	
Harry F. Curvin	1941	1964	Democratic	
Alfred U. Menard	1964	1965	Democratic	
John J. Wrenn	1965	1969	Democratic	
Joseph A. Bevilacqua	1969	1976	Democratic	Chief Justice of the Rhode Island Supreme Court
John J. Skiffington Jr.	1976	1977	Democratic	
Edward P. Manning	1977	1980	Democratic	
Matthew J. Smith	1980	1988	Democratic	
Joseph DeAngelis	1988	1992	Democratic	
John B. Harwood	1993	2002	Democratic	
William J. Murphy	2003	2010	Democratic	
Gordon Fox	2010	2014	Democratic	Resigned following an FBI raid on his office and home
Nicholas Mattiello	2014	2021	Democratic	
Joe Shekarchi	2021	2026	Democratic	
Christopher Blazejewski	2026	Present	Democratic	

== See also ==
- Rhode Island House of Representatives
- List of Rhode Island state legislatures
