= William Coddington (disambiguation) =

William Coddington (c. 1601–1678) was a magistrate of the Massachusetts Bay Colony and later of the Colony of Rhode Island and Providence Plantations.

William Coddington may also refer to:

- Sir William Coddington, 1st Baronet (1830–1918), English cotton manufacturer and politician
- William Coddington Jr. (1651–1689), governor of the Colony of Rhode Island and Providence Plantations
- William Coddington III (1680–1755), speaker of the House of Deputies of the Colony of Rhode Island and Providence Plantations

== See also ==
- Coddington (disambiguation)
