= Thomas Frye (Rhode Island governor) =

Colonial deputy governor (1666–1748)

21st Deputy Governor of the Colony of Rhode Island and Providence Plantations
- In office 1727–1729
- Governor: Joseph Jenckes
- Preceded by: Jonathan Nichols
- Succeeded by: John Wanton

Speaker of the Rhode Island House of Representatives
- In office October 1729 – May 1730
- Preceded by: Samuel Clarke
- Succeeded by: Samuel Clarke
- In office August 1727 – October 1727
- Preceded by: Jeremiah Gould
- Succeeded by: Job Greene
- In office October 1725 – May 1726
- Preceded by: William Coddington III
- Succeeded by: William Coddington III
- In office May 1724 – October 1724
- Preceded by: William Coddington III
- Succeeded by: William Coddington III
- In office May 1722 – October 1722
- Preceded by: William Wanton
- Succeeded by: William Coddington III
- In office October 1717 – May 1718
- Preceded by: William Wanton
- Succeeded by: William Wanton
- In office October 1713 – October 1714
- Preceded by: John Wanton
- Succeeded by: Randall Holden Jr.

Personal details
- Born: 1666 Newport, Rhode Island
- Died: 3 September 1748 (aged 81–82) East Greenwich, Rhode Island
- Spouse: Welthyan Greene
- Children: 7

Thomas Fry (1666 – 3 September 1748) was a deputy governor of the Colony of Rhode Island and Providence Plantations.

== Early life ==
Fry was in 1666, in Newport, Rhode Island, to Thomas and Mary Fry. Fry was a glazier by trade. He became a freeman of East Greenwich in 1690, aged about 24.

== Career ==
Fry began a long career of civil service in 1696 when he became a deputy, serving in that role during most years over a period of three and a half decades. From 1698 to 1704, he was Justice of the Peace, he later served as Clerk of the Assembly for several years, and he was Speaker of the House of Deputies for ten years between 1713 and 1730.

In 1707, Fry was appointed one of the commissioners to settle with Massachusetts the northern boundary of Rhode Island, and two years later he was appointed to a committee to run lines between the two colonies. In 1715, he and Andrew Harris were appointed by the Assembly to transcribe and to prepare for the press all the laws of the colony, and in 1719 he was allowed ten pounds for his efforts to get the laws printed.

In 1727, Fry was selected to complete the term as Deputy Governor of Jonathan Nichols who had died in office. He served under Joseph Jenckes who had just taken office the same year, and then was selected for the same position in 1728, serving for another year.

== Personal life ==
On 1 February 1688, Fry married Welthyan Greene, daughter of Thomas Greene and Elizabeth (née Barton) Greene, niece of Deputy Governor John Greene Jr., and granddaughter of John Greene who was a co-founder of Warwick, Rhode Island. Together, they were the parents of:

- Thomas Fry (1693–1732), who married Mary Greene, daughter of Samuel Greene and Mary (née Gorton) Greene (granddaughter of Samuel Gorton), in 1719. After her death he married Eleanor Greene, daughter of Richard Greene and Eleanor (née Sayles) Greene (granddaughter of Roger Williams), in 1740.
- Mary Fry (1693–1732), who married John Spencer, daughter of Speaker John Spencer and Audrey (née Greene) Spencer, in 1716.
- John Fry (1695–1753), who married Elizabeth Greene, daughter of Benjamin Greene and Susanna (née Holden) Greene.
- Elizabeth Fry (b. 1697), who married, as his second wife, John Spencer, in 1746.
- Welthian Fry (b. 1700)
- Hannah Fry (b. 1702), who married John Holden, son of Lt. Charles Holden and Catharine (née Greene) Holden.
- Ruth Fry (c. 1703–1755), who died unmarried.

He died on 3 September 1748, aged 81 or 82, in East Greenwich, leaving a large estate valued at more than 22,000 pounds, which included slaves that were conveyed in his will to his unmarried daughters.

== See also ==
- List of lieutenant governors of Rhode Island
- List of colonial governors of Rhode Island
