= Daniel Abbott =

24th Deputy Governor of the Colony of Rhode Island and Providence Plantations
- In office 1738–1740
- Governor: John Wanton
- Preceded by: George Hazard
- Succeeded by: Richard Ward

Personal details
- Born: 25 April 1682 Providence, Rhode Island
- Died: 7 November 1760 (aged 78) Providence, Rhode Island
- Spouse: Mary Fenner
- Occupation: Deputy, Speaker of House of Deputies, Clerk of Assembly, Deputy Governor

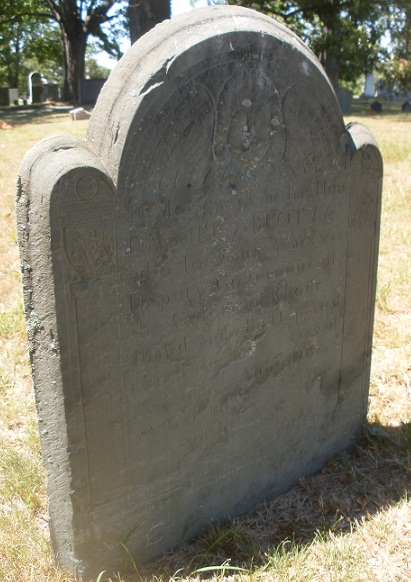
Daniel Abbott grave marker, North Burial Ground, Providence

Daniel Abbott (25 April 1682 – 7 November 1760) was a deputy governor of the Colony of Rhode Island and Providence Plantations.

== Early life ==
He was the son of Daniel and Margaret (née White) Abbott of Providence in the Rhode Island colony and was called Daniel Abbott, Jr. when he was made a freeman of Providence in 1708.

== Career ==
He served on the Providence Town Council in 1713, and the same year he served as Deputy which he held numerous times until the year of his death. In 1720, he was Clerk of the Assembly, and from 1737 to 1738 he was Speaker of the House of Deputies. In 1738, he was elected as Deputy Governor of the colony and served for two one-year terms under Governor John Wanton.

In 1723, Abbott and his wife deeded a plot of land in Providence for establishing a church "in the Presbyterian or Congregational way." Ten years later, he and two others were appointed by the Assembly to erect a new jail in Providence of the same size as the one in Kings County. Early in 1740, he was given 20 pounds for his time and expense in revising and renewing the boundary line between the Rhode Island and Connecticut colonies, and later that year he was on a committee to determine the boundaries between the Rhode Island and Massachusetts colonies. In 1741, he and two others were appointed to set off a part of Warwick to establish the town of Coventry, Rhode Island.

== Personal life ==
Abbott married Mary Fenner, the daughter of Major Thomas Fenner and Dinah Borden. She predeceased him on 7 January 1759. The couple had no children, so much of his estate was left to his Fenner relatives. Executors of his will were future Deputy Governors of the colony Jabez Bowen and Darius Sessions. Daniel and Mary Abbott are buried in the North Burial Ground, Providence, Rhode Island.

== See also ==
- List of lieutenant governors of Rhode Island
- List of colonial governors of Rhode Island
- Colony of Rhode Island and Providence Plantations
