= William Coddington III =

Colonial American politician and merchant

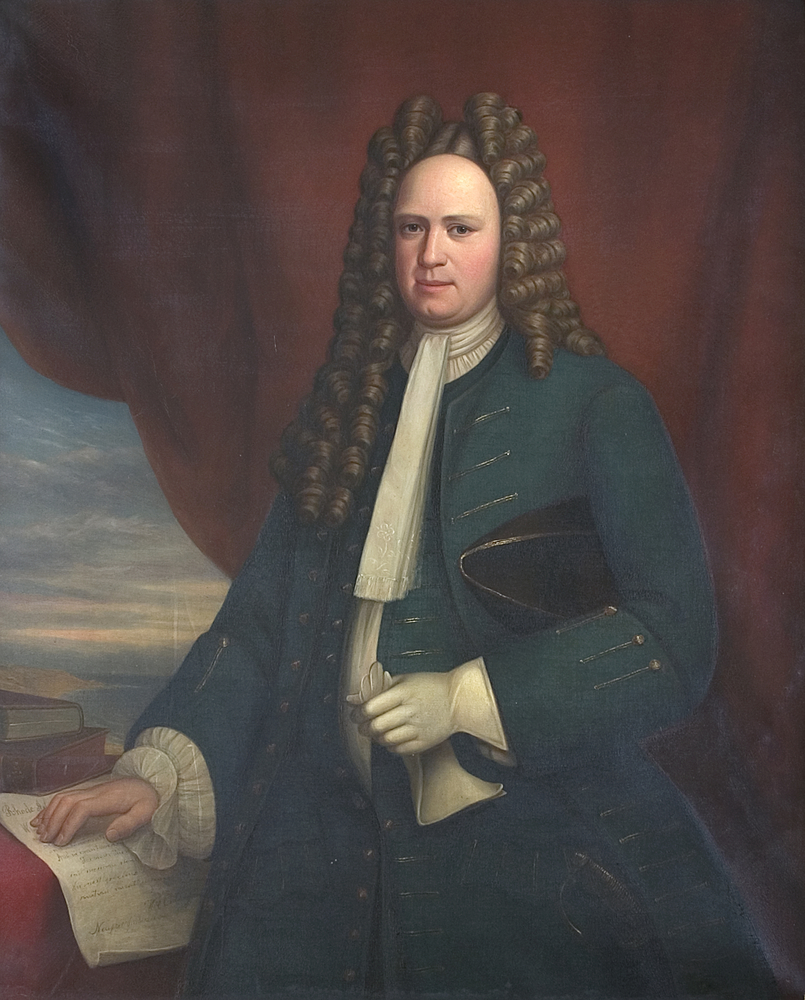
- Portrait of Coddington by Thomas Mathewson after Nehemiah Partridge, 1857

Speaker of the House of Deputies of the Colony of Rhode Island and Providence Plantations
- In office May 1726 – October 1726
- Preceded by: Thomas Frye
- Succeeded by: Jeremiah Gould
- In office October 1724 – October 1725
- Preceded by: Thomas Frye
- Succeeded by: Thomas Frye
- In office May 5, 1724 – May 6, 1724
- Preceded by: Thomas Frye
- Succeeded by: William Wanton
- In office October 1722 – February 1723
- Preceded by: William Wanton
- Succeeded by: Thomas Frye

Personal details
- Born: July 15, 1680; Newport, Rhode Island
- Died: 1755 (aged 74–75); Newport, Rhode Island
- Relations: William Coddington (grandfather); William Coddington Jr. (uncle)
- Parent(s): Nathaniel Coddington; Susanna Hutchinson

William Coddington (July 15, 1680 – 1755) was a colonial American politician and merchant.

== Early life ==
Coddington was born on July 15, 1680, in Newport in what was then the Colony of Rhode Island and Providence Plantations. He was the son of Susanna (née Hutchinson) Coddington and Maj. Nathaniel Coddington (1653–1723). Among his siblings were Anne Coddington (wife of the Rev. Samuel Niles) and Nathaniel Coddington (who married Hope Brown).

His paternal grandparents were William Coddington, the first Governor of the Colony of Rhode Island and a founder of Newport, and his third wife, Anne Brinley (the daughter of Thomas Brinley and Anna (née Wase) Brinley). His uncle, William Coddington Jr., also served as Governor from 1683 to 1685. His maternal grandparents were Edward Hutchinson (a son of William and Anne Hutchinson) and Katherine (née Hamby) Hutchinson.

== Career ==
Coddington was a prominent merchant in Newport. From 1717 to 1718, he was Major for the Island and from 1719 to 1720, Lt. Col. of the regiment of the militia for the Island.

A member of the House of Deputies, he served as Speaker of the House at four different times between 1722 and 1726. From 1734 to 1735, he was one of the four Justices in the Court of Common Pleas for Newport County.

== Personal life ==
On November 12, 1700, Coddington was married to Content Arnold (1680–1721), a daughter of Benedict Arnold Jr. and Mary (née Turner) Arnold. Her paternal grandfather was English born Benedict Arnold, president and then governor of the Colony of Rhode Island. Content's brother, Benedict Arnold III, married Hannah Waterman King and was the father of Gen. Benedict Arnold (notorious today for his treason during the American Revolutionary War). Together, William and Content were the parents of:

- Susannah Coddington (b. 1708), who married John Oulton in 1726.
- William Coddington IV (1710–1780), who married Penelope Goulding, a daughter of George Goulding, in 1737.
- Edward Coddington (b. 1712)
- Thomas Coddington (1715–1736), who died unmarried.
- Nathaniel Coddington (1717–1744), who died unmarried.
- Arnold Coddington (1718–1742), who died unmarried.

After her death in 1721, he married Jeanne Bernon (1696–1752) in Providence, Rhode Island on October 11, 1722. She was a daughter of wealthy French Huguenot merchant Gabriel Bernon and Esther (née LeRoy) Bernon. Jeanne had been born in La Rochelle, France and her father had helped establish the Cathedral of St. John in Providence. Together, they were the parents of:

- Content Coddington (b. 1724)
- Esther Coddington (b. 1727)
- John Coddington (b. 1728)
- Jane Coddington (b. 1720)
- Francis Coddington (b. 1732)
- Annie Coddington (b. 1734)

Coddington died in 1755 in Newport.
