= Governor Coddington =

Governor Coddington may refer to:

- William Coddington Jr. (1651–1689), Governor of the Colony of Rhode Island and Providence Plantations from 1683 to 1685
- William Coddington (1601–1678), 1st Governor of Newport and Portsmouth from 1651 to 1653, and later Governor of the Colony of Rhode Island and Providence Plantations
