= Governor Wanton =

Governor Wanton may refer to:

- Gideon Wanton (1693–1767), Governor of the Colony of Rhode Island and Providence Plantations for two terms between 1745 and 1748
- John Wanton (1672–1740), Governor of the Colony of Rhode Island and Providence Plantations from 1734 to 1740
- Joseph Wanton (1705–1780), Governor of the Colony of Rhode Island and Providence Plantations from 1769 to 1775
- William Wanton (1670–1733), Governor of the Colony of Rhode Island and Providence Plantations from 1732 to 1733
