= George Hazard =

Governor in British North America (1700–1738)

23rd Deputy Governor of the Colony of Rhode Island and Providence Plantations
- In office 1734–1738
- Governor: John Wanton
- Preceded by: John Wanton
- Succeeded by: Daniel Abbott

Personal details
- Born: 9 October 1700
- Died: 1738 (aged 37–38) South Kingstown, Rhode Island
- Spouse: Sarah Carder
- Children: Mary, George, Abigail, Sarah, Penelope, Carder, Arnold
- Occupation: Deputy, Speaker of House of Deputies, Deputy Governor

George Hazard (9 October 1700 – 1738) was a deputy governor of the Colony of Rhode Island and Providence Plantations.

== Life ==
George Hazard's family origins were deeply rooted in Rhode Island history. His great grandfather was Thomas Hazard who settled in Portsmouth by way of Boston. He was the son of Colonel George Hazard and Penelope (Arnold) Hazard of South Kingstown in the Rhode Island colony. His father served as a Lieutenant-Colonel of the Rhode Island Militia and thereafter used the honorific Colonel. Colonel George ran a large farm and his personal estate detailed that he enslaved 17 people. His mother, Penelope Arnold, was a daughter of Caleb and Abigail (Wilbur) Arnold, and a granddaughter of Governor Benedict Arnold, and of Samuel Wilbur, Jr. She was also a great granddaughter of two signers of the Portsmouth Compact, John Porter and Samuel Wilbore. Hazard's first cousin, Robert Hazard, later became deputy governor of the colony.

The subject George Hazard became a freeman of South Kingstown in 1721, a Deputy in 1729, serving for five years in that capacity, and in 1733 was Speaker of the House of Deputies. In 1734 he was elected as Deputy Governor of the colony, serving until his death in 1738.

In 1733 Hazard paid £1,000 to his father for a farm called the "Foddering Place," and built a large mansion house there. In his will he left this farm to his son, also named George Hazard, who would become the Mayor of Newport Another son, Carder Hazard, served on the Rhode Island Supreme Court.

Hazard's wife, Sarah, the daughter of James and Mary (Whipple) Carder, also died in 1738, shortly after Hazard's death which was likely in the spring of 1738, since his will was recorded on 22 May of that year. The couple had seven children, the second of whom, also named George Hazard, would go on to be an incorporator and trustee of Rhode Island College, now known as Brown University.

== Ancestry ==
Most of the given ancestry of Hazard is found in John O. Austin's Genealogical Dictionary of Rhode Island. The early Brownell line is found online.

Ancestors of George Hazard

8. Thomas Hazard (by 1610-after 1677)
4. Robert Hazard (1635-c.1710)
9. Martha
2. George Hazard (died 1743)
20. possibly Robert Brownell
10. Thomas Brownell (1608 - 1665)
21. possibly Mary Wilson
5. Mary Brownell (1639-1739)
22. possibly Richard Bourne
11. Anne Bourne (1607 - after 1665)
23. possibly Judith Cowper
1. George Hazard (1700-1738)
24. William Arnold (1587–1676)
12. Benedict Arnold (1615–1678)
25. Christian Peake (1584- c. 1659)
6. Caleb Arnold (1644-1719)
26. Stukely Westcott (1592–1677)
13. Damaris Westcott (1621 – after 1678)
27. Juliann Marchante (born c. 1600)
3. Penelope Arnold (1669-after 1742)
28. Samuel Wilbore (c.1595-1656)
14. Samuel Wilbur, Jr. (1622 - 1697?)
29. Ann Smith
7. Abigail Wilbur (c.1646-1730)
30. John Porter (c.1605-after 1674)
15. Hannah Porter (died 1722)
31. Margaret (Lang) Odding

== See also ==
- List of lieutenant governors of Rhode Island
- List of colonial governors of Rhode Island
