= Randall Holden Jr. =

Major Randall Holden Jr.

Speaker of the Rhode Island House of Representatives
- In office October 1714 – May 1715
- Preceded by: Thomas Frye
- Succeeded by: William Wanton

Personal details
- Born: April 1660 Warwick, Colony of Rhode Island, British America
- Died: 13 September 1726 (aged 66) Warwick, Colony of Rhode Island, British America
- Spouse: Bethiah Waterman (m. 1686; died 1726)
- Children: 7
- Parent(s): Randall Holden; Frances Dungan

Major Randall Holden Jr. (April 1660 – 13 September 1726) was a colonial Rhode Island politician.

== Early life ==
Holden was born in April 1660 in Warwick in the Colony of Rhode Island and Providence Plantations. He was the son of Frances (née Dungan) Holden (1632–1696) and Randall Holden, co-founder of Portsmouth and Warwick who was one of the signers of the Portsmouth Compact. His younger brother, Charles Holden, married Catherine Greene (a daughter of Deputy Governor John Greene Jr.), and his younger sister, Susannah Holden, married Benjamin Greene (son of Thomas Greene and grandson of John Greene, an early settler of the Colony of Rhode Island and Providence Plantations who was one of the 12 original proprietors of Providence and a co-founder of the town of Warwick).

== Career ==
Holden was a member of the House of Deputies (precursor to Representatives) for Warwick in 1696, 1699, 1700, 1704, 1714 to 1715, and in 1721. From October 1714 to May 1715, he served as Speaker of the House of Deputies. He was Assistant of the Rhode Island Colony (essentially the Upper House of the Assembly) from 1705 to 1713 and from 1715 to 1725. In 1706, he was appointed Major for the Main and was a member of the commission that determined the border with Connecticut.

== Personal life ==
On 27 January 1686/7, Holden was married to Bethiah Waterman (1664–1742), a daughter of Nathaniel Waterman and Susanna (née Carder) Waterman. Her grandfather, Richard Waterman, was one of the original proprietors of Providence. Together, they were the parents of:

- John Holden (1687–1749)
- Wait Holden (b. 1690), who died young.
- Susanna Holden (1692–1745), who died unmarried.
- Randall Holden III (1694–1766), who married Rose Wickes, daughter of John Wickes and Sarah (née Gorton) Wickes (granddaughter of Samuel Gorton) in 1724.
- Wait Holden (1696–c. 1748), who married her cousin William Holden in 1721.
- Mary Holden (1699–1738), who married Capt. Thomas Rice.
- Frances Holden (1701–1732), who married Capt. John Low, son of Anthony Low and Mary (née Arnold) Low.

Holden died in Warwick on 13 September 1726.
