= Henry Bull (speaker) =

Politician of the Colony of Rhode Island

Speaker of the House of Delegates of Rhode Island
- In office April 1728 – May 1729
- Preceded by: Job Greene
- Succeeded by: Samuel Clarke

Attorney General of Rhode Island
- In office 1721–1722
- Governor: Samuel Cranston
- Preceded by: Weston Clarke
- Succeeded by: Daniel Updike

Personal details
- Born: 23 November 1687 Newport, Rhode Island
- Died: 24 December 1774 (aged 87) Newport, Rhode Island
- Resting place: Common Burying Ground, Newport
- Spouse(s): Martha Odlin (m. 1710; died 1721) Phebe Coggeshall (m. 1722; died 1774)
- Children: 16

Henry Bull (23 November 1687 – 24 December 1774) was a colonial attorney and politician in Rhode Island.

== Early life ==
Bull was born on 23 November 1687 in Newport in the Colony of Rhode Island and Providence Plantations. He was a son of Henry Bull (1658–1691) and Ann (née Cole) Bull, who lived in Narragansett. After his parents death, Henry and his siblings were left in the care of his aunt Mary (wife of James Coggeshall). Among his siblings were Ephraim Bull and Ann Bull.

His paternal grandfather was Jireh Bull (son of Henry Bull, Governor of Rhode Island from 1685 to 1686 and again in 1690). His uncle, Jireh Bull, married Godsgift Arnold (the daughter of Gov. Benedict Arnold). His maternal grandparents were John Cole of Kingston and Susanna (née Hutchinson) Cole (a daughter of William and Anne Hutchinson).

== Career ==
Bull was apprenticed as a carpenter, but abandoned it to study law at the age of twenty-seven, becoming "one of the foremost lawyers of his day in Rhode Island." In 1720, he was appointed captain of the First Military Company in Newport.

He served as Attorney General of Rhode Island from 1721 to 1722. In 1720, he was elected as a Delegate to the Rhode Island General Assembly and served as Speaker of the House of Delegates from April 1728 to May 1729. He was the first justice of the Court of Common Pleas for the Newport County when the courts were established in 1729.

== Personal life ==
On 22 June 1710, Bull was married to Martha Odlin (1691–1721), a daughter of John Odlin and Lydia (née Tillinghast) Odlin. Before her death in 1721, they were the parents of four sons and two daughters, including:

- Henry Bull (1711–1731), who died unmarried.
- Lydia Bull (1712–1764), who married Capt. Rouse Potter.
- John Bull (1715–1726), who died young.
- Elisha Bull (1718–1718), who died in infancy.
- Jireh Bull (1721–1721), who died in infancy.

After the death of his first wife, he married Phebe Coggeshall (1706–1774) on 1 February 1722. Phebe was a daughter of Daniel Coggeshall of Portsmouth (son of President John Coggeshall) and Mary (née Mowry) Coggeshall. Together, they were the parents of seven sons and three daughters, including:

- Joseph Bull (1722–1774), who married Sarah Nichols in 1746.
- Ann Bull (1723–1790), married William Stevens, son of John Stephens, in 1742.
- Daniel Bull (1725–1753), who died unmarried.
- Mary Bull (1728–1821), who married Jonathan Nichols, Deputy Gov. of Rhode Island, in 1750. After his death in 1756, she married John Gideon, son of Gov. Gideon Wanton, in 1760.
- Peleg Bull (1730–1750), who died unmarried.
- Henry Bull (1732–c. 1781)
- John Bull (1734–1808), who married Ruth Cornell, a daughter of George Cornell of Middletown.
- Phebe Bull (1739–1814)
- William Bull (1740–c. 1782)
- George Bull (1743–1760), who died young.

Bull died on 24 December 1774 and was buried in the Common Burying Ground in Newport.
