= Welcome Arnold =

American politician (1745–1798)

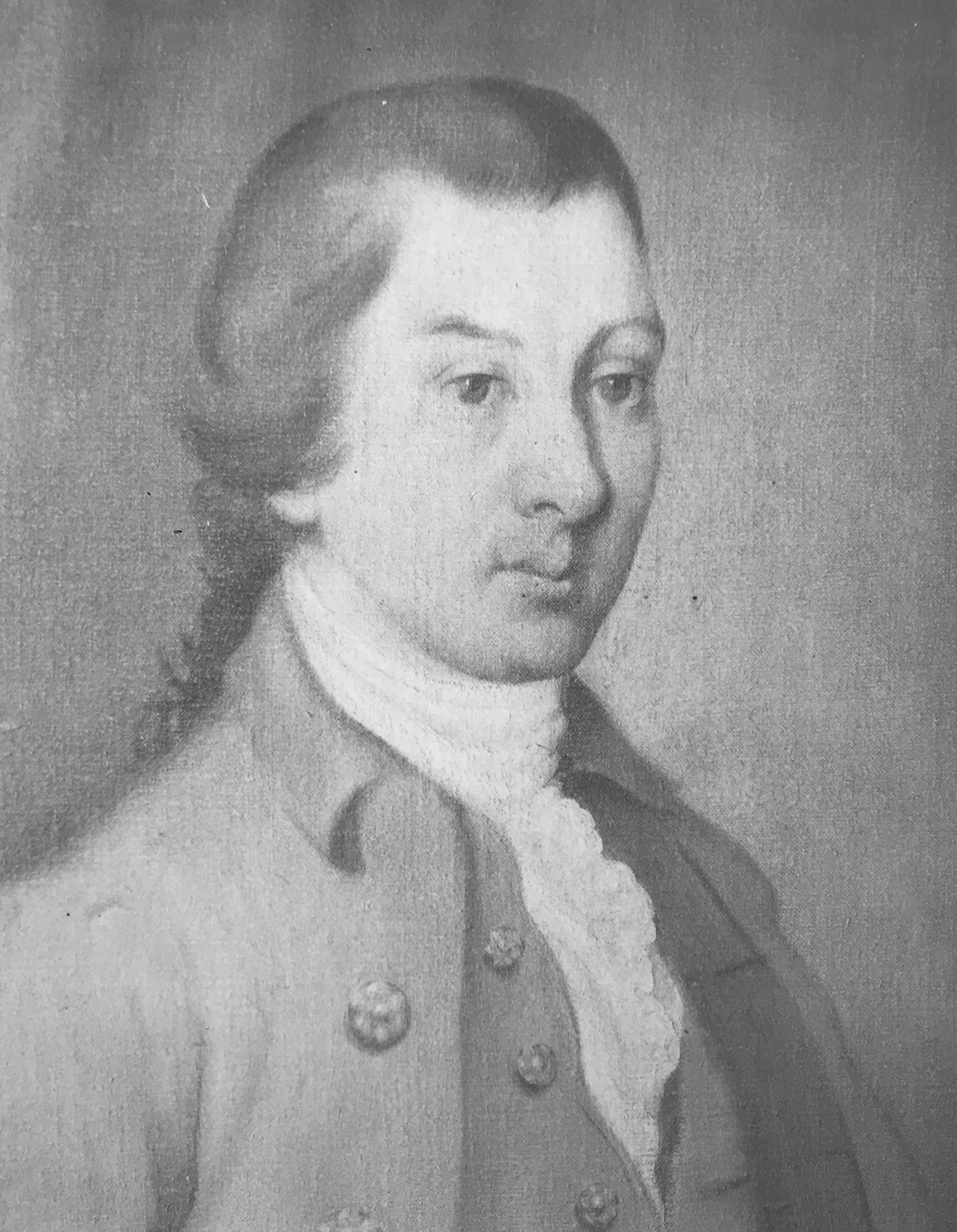
- Portrait of Arnold, between 1760 and 1798

Speaker of the House of Deputies of the Colony of Rhode Island and Providence Plantations
- In office May 1793 – May 1795
- Preceded by: William Bradford
- Succeeded by: Joseph Stanton Jr.
- In office October 1790 – May 1791
- Preceded by: William Bradford
- Succeeded by: Joseph Stanton Jr.
- In office June 1780 – July 1780
- Preceded by: William Bradford
- Succeeded by: William Bradford

Personal details
- Born: March 24, 1745 Smithfield, Rhode Island
- Died: September 29, 1798 (aged 53) Providence, Rhode Island
- Spouse: Patience Greene (m. 1773; died 1798)
- Relations: Samuel G. Arnold (grandson)
- Children: 14
- Parent(s): Jonathan Arnold; Abigail Smith

Welcome Arnold (March 24, 1745 – September 29, 1798) was a colonial American politician and merchant.

== Early life ==
Arnold was born on March 24, 1745. He was one of twelve children born to Jonathan Arnold (1709–1796) and Abigail (née Smith) Arnold (1714–1801). His sister, Elizabeth Arnold, married Samuel Arnold (son of Joseph Arnold), and another sister, Abigail Arnold, married Nathaniel Greene (son of Caleb Greene).

His maternal grandparents were Benjamin Smith and Mercy (née Angell) Smith. His paternal grandparents were Arnold and Sarah (née Parrish) Arnold. He was a descendant of William Arnold, one of the founding settlers of the Colony of Rhode Island and Providence Plantations.

== Career ==
In 1772 he was elected a Deputy to the Rhode Island Assembly from Smithfield, at which time he was also appointed a justice of the peace. In 1778 he was again elected as a Representative to the Assembly from Providence and was reelected up until his death in 1798.

Arnold, a member of the Sons of Liberty, was reportedly involved in the planning of the 1772 burning of the HMS Gaspee in Narragansett Bay, which later became known as the Gaspee affair. Occurring three years before the Boston Tea Party, it is considered the first act of civil disobedience against the Crown.

A prominent merchant in the New England-Caribbean trade, Arnold was "also a leader in the fight to end Rhode Island's involvement in the African slave trade." He served as a trustee of Brown University.

== Personal life ==
On February 11, 1773, Arnold was married to Patience Greene (1754–1809), a daughter of Patience (née Cooke) Greene and Samuel Greene (grandson of John Greene Jr.). As her parents had died, Patience was raised, and married, in the Warwick house of her uncle, William Greene, the Governor of the colony of Rhode Island. The marriage was said to have "consolidated landed and mercantile power in colonial Rhode Island". Together, they were the parents of fourteen children, only four of whom lived to maturity, including:

- Mary "Polly" Arnold (1774–1851), who married U.S. Representative Tristam Burges in 1801.
- Samuel Greene Arnold (1778–1826), who married Frances Rogers, a daughter of Lt. John Rogers, in 1813.
- Eliza Harriet Arnold (1796–1873), who married industrialist Zachariah Allen, brother of Gov. and U.S. Senator Philip Allen, in 1817.
- Richard James Arnold (1796–1873), who invested in southern cotton manufacturing who married Louisa Caroline Gindrat.

In 1785, Arnold built a two and a half story Federal style home at the corner of South Main and Planet Street in Providence. He died in 1798 and was buried in the North Burial Ground.

=== Descendants ===
Through his eldest son Samuel, he was posthumously a grandfather of Samuel G. Arnold, the Lieutenant Governor of Rhode Island who served as a U.S. Senator from Rhode Island during the U.S. Civil War. Samuel married his first cousin, Louisa Gindrat Arnold, daughter Welcome's youngest son, Richard.

Through his daughter Eliza, he was posthumously grandfather of Anne Crawford Allen (wife of William Davis Ely), Mary Arnold Allen (wife of merchant Andrew Robeson Jr.) and Candace Allen.
