= Stephen Potter (judge) =

American judge

Stephen Potter (August 14, 1727 – 1793) was a Rhode Island politician who served for three periods a justice of the Rhode Island Supreme Court.

Potter was the son of the first settler in Cranston, Rhode Island, and moved to the county of Kent, Rhode Island, and settled. He was "a leading politician in the paper-money party, which arose in Rhode Island soon after the Revolutionary War", and served as "speaker of the House of Representatives, chief-justice of the Court of Common Pleas, and a judge of the Supreme Court of the State".

Potter's served on the Rhode Island Supreme Court from May 1764 to May 1765, and again from May 1767 to May 1768, and a third time from May 1778 to May 1780; his service as Speaker of the House was from 1778 to 1779.

Political offices
Preceded by Thomas Cranston; William Hall; William Greene	Justice of the Rhode Island Supreme Court; 1764–1765; 1767–1768; 1779–1780	Succeeded by Henry Harris; Nathaniel Searle; Peter Phillips
