= John Spencer (speaker) =

John Spencer JP

Speaker of the Rhode Island House of Representatives
- In office February 1712 – May 1712
- Preceded by: James Greene
- Succeeded by: Ebenezer Slocum

Personal details
- Born: 20 April 1666 Newport, Colony of Rhode Island, British America
- Died: 1743 (aged 86–87) East Greenwich, Colony of Rhode Island, British America
- Spouse: Audrey Greene (m. 1684; died 1744)
- Children: John Spencer; William Spencer
- Parent(s): Dr. John Spencer; Susannah Griffin

John Spencer JP (20 April 1666 – 1743) was a colonial Rhode Island politician.

== Early life ==
Spencer was born on 20 April 1666 in Newport in the Colony of Rhode Island and Providence Plantations. He was the eldest son of nine children born to Dr. John Spencer (1638–1684), who was made freeman of Newport in 1668, and Susannah (née Griffin) Spencer (1644–1719).

His paternal grandfather, Michael Spencer, was born in Stotfold, Bedford, England before emigrating to the Massachusetts Bay Colony aboard the ship Mary and John in 1634, first settling at Cambridge before moving to Lynn. After his grandfather's death, his grandmother Isabel remarried to Thomas Robbins before her death in Salem in 1674. His maternal grandparents were Robert and Hannah Griffin.

== Career ==
Spencer was a prominent landowner and Justice of the Peace and a cordwainer by trade. He served as Deputy (precursor to Representative) to the General Assembly between 1699 and 1729, as well as Speaker of the House of Deputies from February 1712 to May 1712.

== Personal life ==
Spencer was married to Audrey Greene (1667–1733), a daughter of Deputy Governor John Greene Jr. and granddaughter of John Greene, an early settler of the Colony of Rhode Island and Providence Plantations who was one of the 12 original proprietors of Providence and a co-founder of the town of Warwick. Together, they were the parents of:

- John Spencer (1693–1774), who married his second cousin, Mary Frye, daughter of Deputy Governor Thomas Frye and Welthyan (née Greene) Frye, in 1716. After her death in 1732, he married her younger sister, Elizabeth, in 1740.
- William Spencer (1695–1776), who married Elizabeth Rice, daughter of John Rice and Elnathan (née Whipple) Rice and great-granddaughter of Capt. Randall Holden, in 1716.

Spencer died in East Greenwich in 1743.
