= Jonathan Nichols (Rhode Island politician) =

Capt. Jonathan Nichols Sr.

20th Deputy Governor of the Colony of Rhode Island and Providence Plantations
- In office May 1727 – August 1727
- Governor: Joseph Jenckes
- Preceded by: Joseph Jenckes
- Succeeded by: Thomas Frye

Personal details
- Born: 10 June 1681 Newport, Rhode Island
- Died: 2 August 1727 (aged 46) Newport, Rhode Island
- Spouse: Elizabeth Lawton
- Occupation: Deputy, Assistant, Captain, Deputy Governor

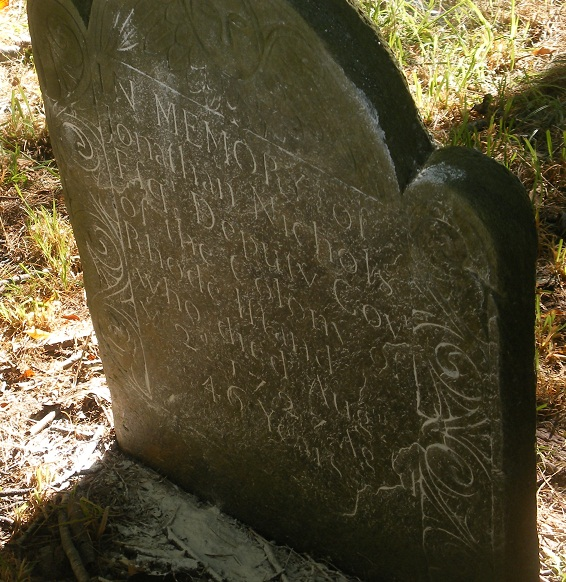
Nichols' grave marker, Nichols-Hassard Cemetery, Portsmouth

Capt. Jonathan Nichols Sr. (10 June 1681 – 2 August 1727) was a deputy governor of the Colony of Rhode Island and Providence Plantations. He was the son of Thomas and Hannah Nichols of Newport. Nichols became a freeman of Newport in 1707, then served many years as either Deputy or Assistant from 1713 to 1727. In 1718 he was called Captain, and in 1721 he was appointed to a committee to rebuild or repair Fort Ann on Goat Island. In May 1727 Nichols was selected as the Deputy Governor of the Rhode Island colony, but he died in office less than three months later in August, and Thomas Frye completed his term.

While his father was an original legatee of the town of East Greenwich, he and his family remained in Newport. With his wife, Elizabeth, the daughter of Robert and Mary (Wodell) Lawton, he had eight children born from 1708 to 1723. Nichols is buried in the Nichols-Hassard Burial Ground in Portsmouth, Rhode Island.

== See also ==
- Jonathan Nichols Jr. for ancestral chart
- List of lieutenant governors of Rhode Island
- List of colonial governors of Rhode Island
- Colony of Rhode Island and Providence Plantations
