= Joseph Jenckes (governor) =

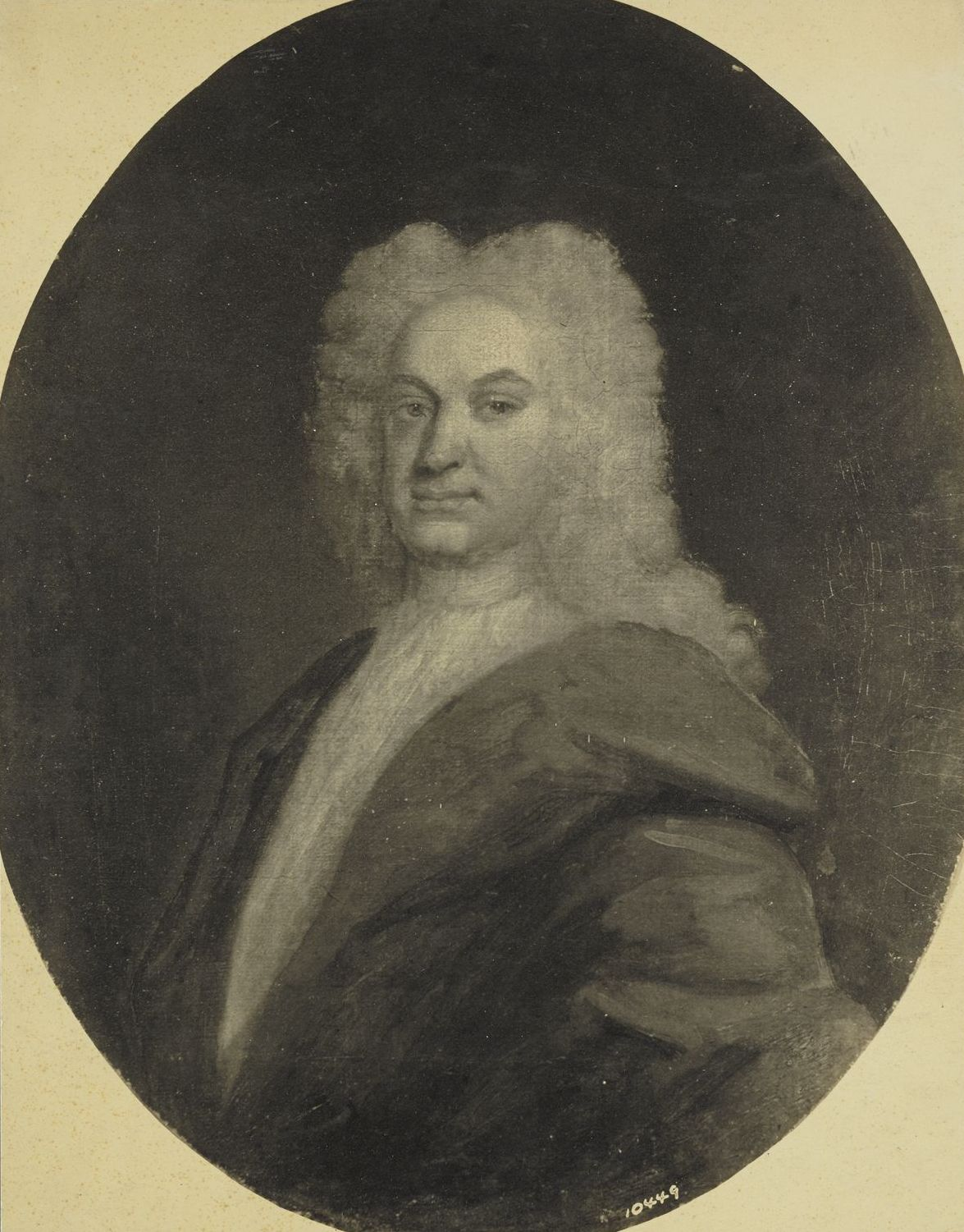

19th Governor of the Colony of Rhode Island and Providence Plantations
- In office 1727–1732
- Preceded by: Samuel Cranston
- Succeeded by: William Wanton

17th and 19th Deputy Governor of the Colony of Rhode Island and Providence Plantations
- In office 1715–1721
- Governor: Samuel Cranston
- Preceded by: Henry Tew
- Succeeded by: John Wanton
- In office 1722–1727
- Governor: Samuel Cranston
- Preceded by: John Wanton
- Succeeded by: Jonathan Nichols

Personal details
- Born: 1656
- Died: 15 June 1740 (aged 83–84) Providence, Rhode Island
- Spouse(s): (1) Martha Brown (2) Alice (Smith) Dexter
- Parents: Joseph Jenckes Jr. (father); Esther Ballard (mother)
- Occupation: Deputy, Speaker of House of Deputies, Major for the Mainland, Deputy Governor, Governor

Joseph Jenckes (1656 – 15 June 1740) was a deputy governor and governor of the Colony of Rhode Island and Providence Plantations.

== Biography ==
Jenckes was the son of Joseph and Esther (Ballard) Jenckes who lived in Lynn, Massachusetts before coming to Rhode Island. His father, the son of an earlier Joseph Jenckes, operated a sawmill in Warwick, but shortly thereafter settled in Providence. The subject Joseph Jenckes became a freeman in Providence in 1681, and ten years later began an extensive career of civil service to the colony. For 12 years from 1691 to 1708 he was a Deputy from Providence, and for four of those years he was the Speaker of the House of Deputies. From 1707 to 1712 he was assigned as Major for the towns of Providence and Warwick, and was also the Assistant from Providence during those years. In 1715 he was elected as the deputy governor of the colony, and held this position every year but one until 1727 when he was elected as governor, which position he held for five consecutive one-year terms.

One of the major issues concerning Rhode Island during Jenckes' terms of leadership was the boundary-line controversy with the neighboring Colony of Connecticut, and between his two terms as Deputy Governor Jenckes was in England with Richard Partridge to obtain royal intervention in this dispute. Connecticut refused to observe the boundary between the two colonies that had been established by commissioners from both colonies who met at Stonington, Connecticut in 1703. The Rhode Island colony was also having boundary line issues with Massachusetts, and Jenckes and his partner were able to get satisfaction from the crown, so that the Rhode Island colony "may not hereafter be molested, as they have hitherto been to their very great prejudice." Several years later, in 1726, Jenckes was one of four commissioners from Rhode Island who met with Connecticut commissioners to settle the line of partition between the two colonies. The following year he wrote a letter on behalf of the General Assembly to King George II thanking him for his protection of Rhode Island's "charter privileges".

Jenckes' first wife was Martha, the daughter of John and Mary (Holmes) Brown, with whom he had nine children and at least 68 grandchildren. Following her death, Jenckes married in 1727 Alice Dexter, the widow of John Dexter who was the son of Gregory Dexter, an early President of Providence and Warwick. Alice was the daughter of John and Sarah (Whipple) Smith. Jenckes died in 1740, "deemed to die intestate by reason of his insanity of mind," and his son Nathaniel was appointed as administrator. Austin wrote that he is buried in the North Burial Ground in Providence, but this is incorrect.

== See also ==
- Colony of Rhode Island and Providence Plantations
- List of colonial governors of Rhode Island
- List of lieutenant governors of Rhode Island
