= Carder Hazard =

American judge (1734–1792)

Carder Hazard (August 11, 1734 – November 24, 1792) was a justice of the Rhode Island Supreme Court from May 1792 until his death in December 1792, midway through a term that would have expired in May 1793.

Hazard's name first appears in records in 1757, as an admitted freeman of the Colony from South Kingstown, Rhode Island. He was described as "tall and well formed, fair in complexion, and (tradition says) an uncommonly handsome man". He was a son of George Hazard, and a brother of Newport mayor George Hazard. Hazard held various public offices over the course of his life, culminating in his service on the Rhode Island Supreme Court.

Hazard married Alice Hull on September 23, 1756. She died on July 1, 1760, at the age of 21. On March 5, 1761, Hazard married Alice Hazard, a distant cousin, who died weeks after Hazard, on January 13, 1793. Hazard died in a fall from a chair that he stood on to take a book from the top of a bookcase, at the house of his son, Doctor George Hazard. An obituary notice, published in the Providence Gazette on December 1, 1792, said:

Last Sunday departed this life, at South Kingstown, in the 59th year of his age, Honorable Carder Hazard, Esq., one of the Judges of the Superior Court of this State. In political life he exhibited the honest citizen and upright judge; subject to laws, he reverenced them, and invested with power, he executed it without intrigue, and without a view of self interest.
In social Life the Goodness of his Heart and Simplicity of his Manners were peculiarly agreeable—but Death has closed his labours! and the Pity of that Death has evidenced the Innocence of his Life. With that of the Public, his particular Friends have united their own Sorrow.
