= John Wanton =

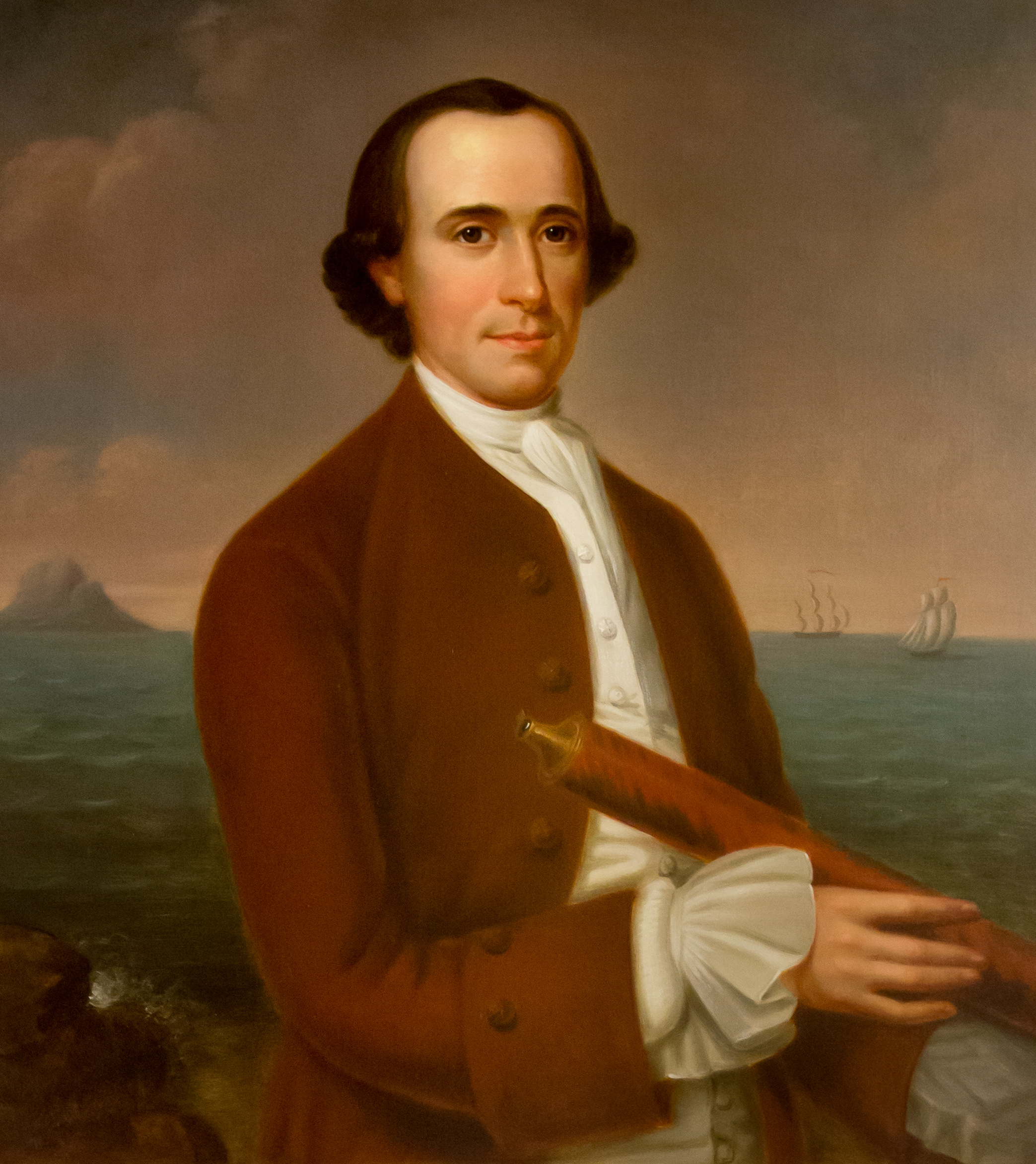

21st Governor of the Colony of Rhode Island and Providence Plantations
- In office 1734–1740
- Preceded by: William Wanton
- Succeeded by: Richard Ward

18th and 22nd Deputy Governor of the Colony of Rhode Island and Providence Plantations
- In office 1721–1722
- Governor: Samuel Cranston
- Preceded by: Joseph Jenckes
- Succeeded by: Joseph Jenckes
- In office 1729–1734
- Governor: Joseph Jenckes; William Wanton
- Preceded by: Thomas Frye
- Succeeded by: George Hazard

Personal details
- Born: December 24, 1672 Scituate, Massachusetts
- Died: July 5, 1740 (aged 67) Newport, Rhode Island
- Resting place: Coddington Cemetery, Newport
- Spouse: Mary Stover
- Occupation: Assistant, Deputy, Speaker of House of Deputies, Deputy Governor, Governor

Coat of Arms of John Wanton

John Wanton (December 24, 1672 – July 5, 1740) was a governor of the Colony of Rhode Island and Providence Plantations, serving for six consecutive terms from 1734 to 1740.

== Early life ==
He was the son of Edward Wanton who was a ship builder, and who became a Quaker after witnessing the persecution of these people, also becoming a preacher of that religion. Edward Wanton had lived in York, Maine; Boston, Massachusetts; and Scituate, Massachusetts before coming to Rhode Island.

== Career ==
Wanton was a merchant, and like his father was a Quaker, and the Friends' records state that "for many years he was a valuable public friend." He first entered public service in 1706 as a deputy from Newport serving for several years in that capacity, and also as the Speaker of the House of Deputies. He was called Colonel John Wanton in 1706 when he went after French privateers with John Dublin, who was wounded in the action.

Between 1721 and 1734 Wanton was the Deputy Governor for the colony, and following the death of his brother, William Wanton, he became governor in 1734, serving continuously until his own death in 1740. He was buried in the Coddington Cemetery in Newport.

== Personal life ==
Wanton was married to Mary Stover, the daughter of Sylvester and Elizabeth (Norton) Stover of Cape Neddick, York County, Maine, and had five children. Wanton's brother, William Wanton, preceded him as governor, and his nephews Gideon Wanton and Joseph Wanton were later governors of the colony.

== See also ==
- List of colonial governors of Rhode Island
- Colony of Rhode Island and Providence Plantations
