= Thomas Cranston =

American judge

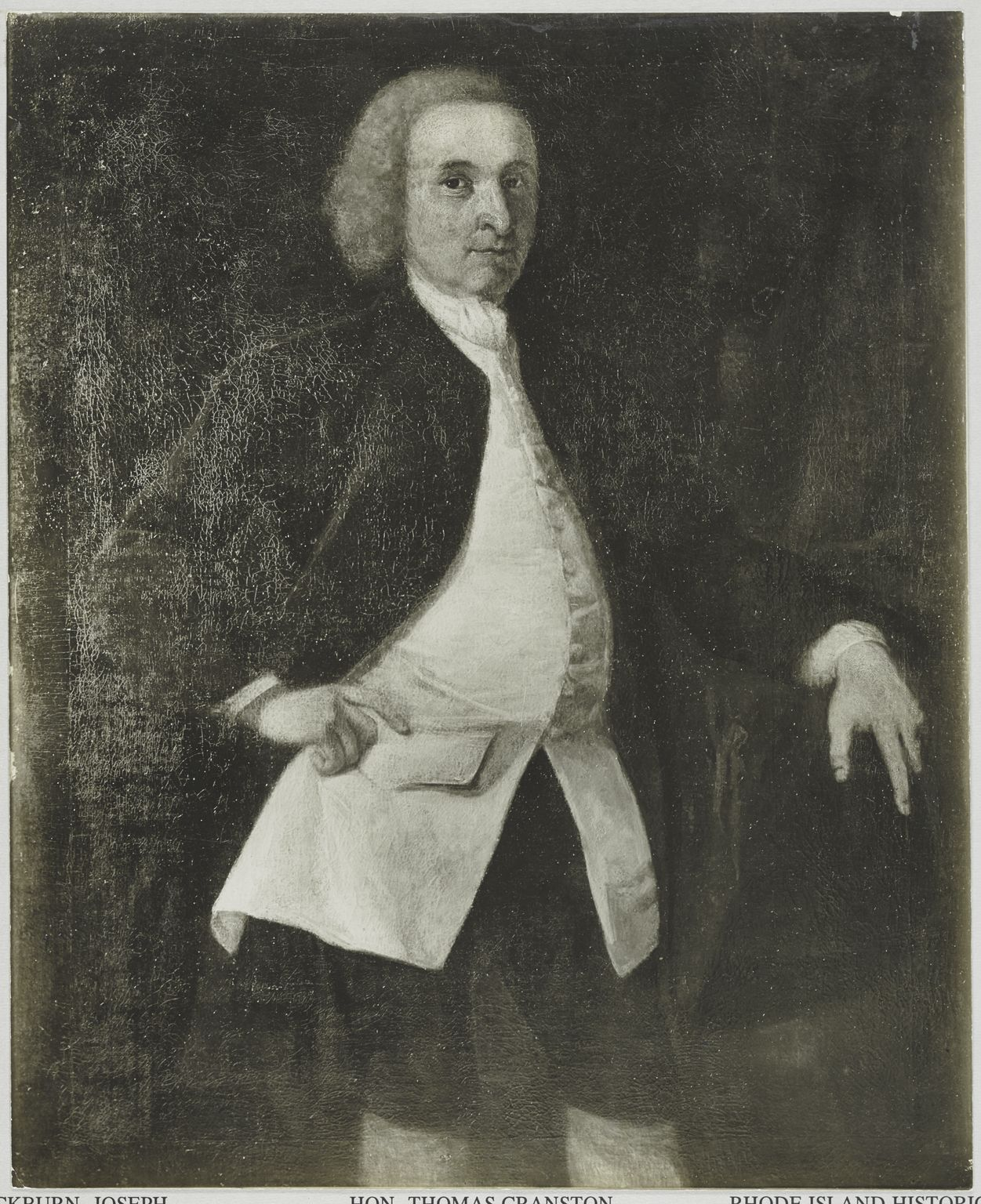

Associate Justice of the Rhode Island Supreme Court
- In office 1762–1764

Speaker of the Rhode Island House of Representatives

Personal details
- Born: October 30, 1710; Newport, Rhode Island
- Died: May 19, 1785 (aged 74); Newport, Rhode Island
- Resting place: Common Burying Ground; Newport, Rhode Island
- Parent: Samuel Cranston (father)

Thomas Cranston was an associate justice of the Rhode Island Supreme Court from August 1763 to May 1764, and served as Speaker of the Rhode Island House of Representatives at the time that Cranston, Rhode Island was created in 1754. Historians believe either Cranston or his grandfather (or father) Samuel Cranston may be the namesake of Cranston, Rhode Island because the first page of the first town record book of Cranston bears the inscription "the gift of Thomas Cranston to the town called Cranston."
