= William Coddington Jr. =

11th Governor of the Colony of Rhode Island and Providence Plantations
- In office 1683–1685
- Preceded by: Peleg Sanford
- Succeeded by: Henry Bull

Personal details
- Born: 18 January 1651 Newport, Rhode Island
- Died: 5 February 1689 (aged 38) Newport, Rhode Island
- Resting place: Coddington Cemetery, Newport
- Occupation: Assistant, Deputy, Governor

William Coddington Jr. (18 January 1651 – 5 February 1689) was an early governor of the Colony of Rhode Island and Providence Plantations, serving two consecutive terms from 1683 to 1685.

== Biography ==
Coddington was the son of William Coddington who served many terms as governor of the two towns of Portsmouth and Newport in the Colony of Rhode Island and Providence Plantations, and later as the governor of all the united towns of the colony. Young Coddington was the sixth of 13 children of his father. He was the first child of his father's third wife, Anne Brinley, the daughter of Thomas and Anna (Wase) Brinley.

Coddington was born and raised in Newport, and became a freeman there in 1675 at the age of 24. He began his political career in 1679 when he was chosen as deputy of the colony for a year, and then became assistant the following two years. In 1683 he was appointed as governor of the colony and served in this capacity for two years. He never married, and died at the age of 38. He was buried in the Coddington Cemetery in Newport.

== See also ==
- List of colonial governors of Rhode Island
