= William Wanton =

Rhode Island colonial governor (1670–1733)

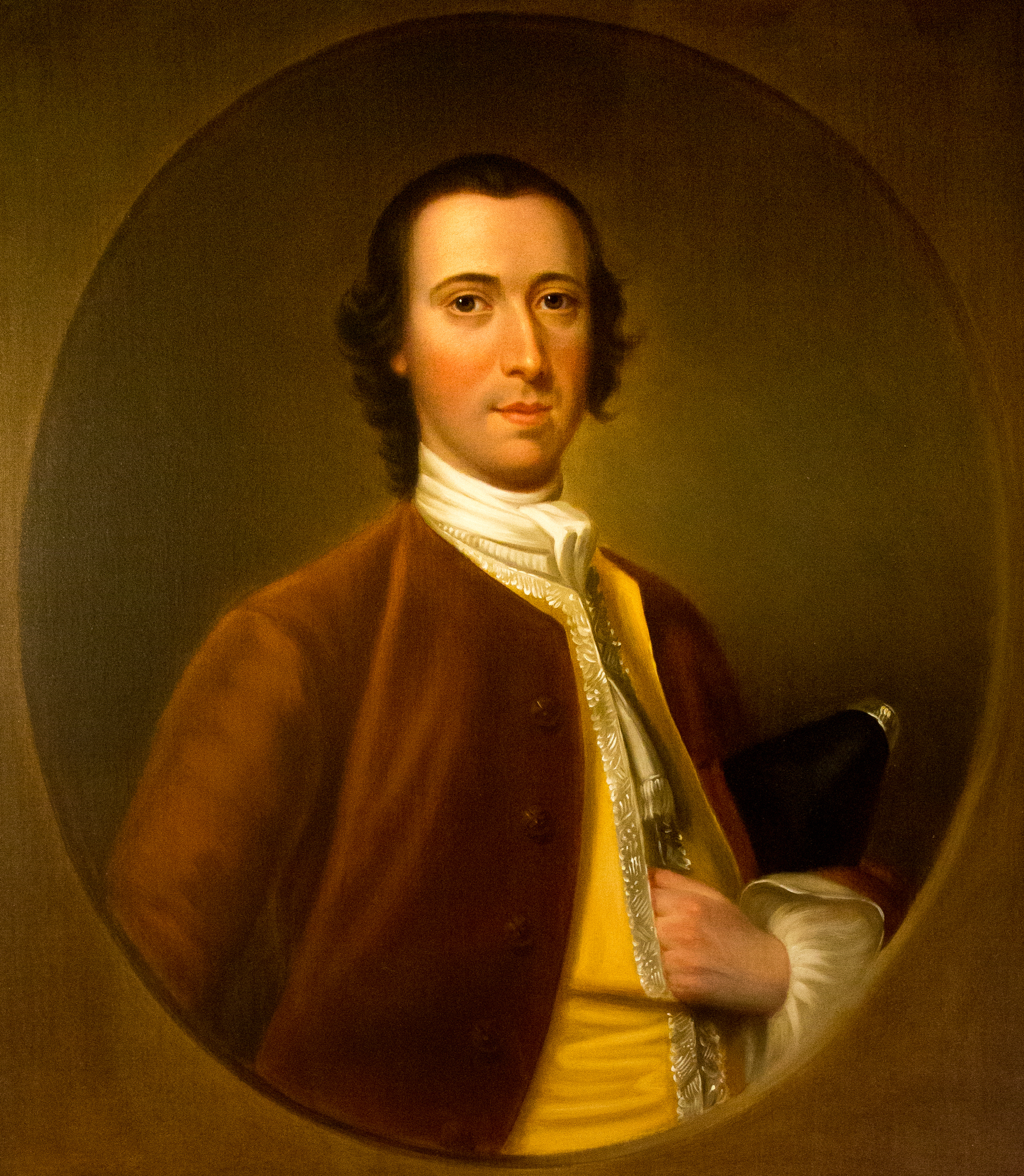
- Official portrait in the Rhode Island State House

20th Governor of the Colony of Rhode Island and Providence Plantations
- In office 1732–1733
- Preceded by: Joseph Jenckes
- Succeeded by: John Wanton

Personal details
- Born: September 15, 1670 Scituate, Massachusetts
- Died: December 1733 (aged 63) Newport, Rhode Island
- Resting place: Clifton Burying Ground, Newport
- Spouse(s): Ruth Bryant; Mary Godfrey
- Occupation: Assistant, Deputy, Colonel of militia, Speaker of House of Deputies, Governor

William Wanton (September 15, 1670 – December 1733) was a governor of the Colony of Rhode Island and Providence Plantations, serving a short term prior to his death. He spent most of his adult life in the civil and military service of the colony and commanded a sloop for chasing privateers.

== Life ==
Coat of Arms of William Wanton

Wanton was the third son of Edward Wanton, a ship builder. After witnessing their persecution, he became a Quaker and preacher. His father had lived in York, Maine; Boston, Massachusetts; and Scituate, Massachusetts before coming to Rhode Island.

=== Civil and military affairs ===
Wanton was a merchant who became a freeman of Newport, Rhode Island in 1698, and was thereafter very active in the civil and military affairs of the town and colony. In all but two years from 1705 to 1732, Wanton was either a deputy or an assistant, and for many of those years he was the Speaker of the House of Deputies.

In the years 1705 to 1706 and 1707 to 1710 he was the "Major for the Islands", having command of the militia companies on Aquidneck, Connanicut, Prudence and Block islands. From 1719 to 1731 he was in command as colonel of the "Militia of the Islands" regiment.

Wanton commanded a sloop that he used to chase privateers, and in 1709 the General Assembly voted to buy his new sloop Diamond for 400 pounds, and also buy another sloop of which he was partial owner. In 1726 he was one of four commissioners from the Rhode Island colony selected to meet with commissioners from Connecticut to settle the boundary line between the two colonies.

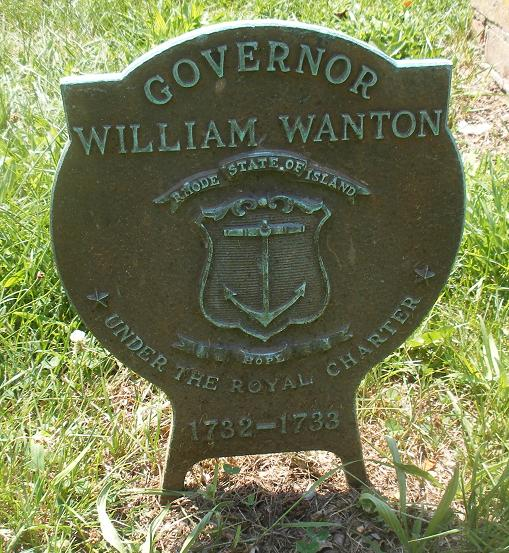
William Wanton Grave Medallion

Wanton was elected governor of the Rhode Island colony in 1732, but only served one full term, dying in office during his second term sometime between 3 December 1733 and 4 February 1734. He was buried in the Clifton Burying Ground in Newport.

=== Family ===
Wanton was twice married, first to Ruth Bryant, the daughter of John and Mary (Hiland) Bryant, and by this marriage had nine children. In 1717, at the age of 46, he married a second time to 15-year-old Mary Godfrey (b. March 23, 1702), the daughter of John and Elizabeth (Carr) Godfrey, and granddaughter of Governor Caleb Carr. There were no known children by this marriage. Long after his death, his widow married in 1745 Daniel Updike. Wanton's brother, John Wanton, succeeded him as governor, his nephew Gideon Wanton was later governor, and his son Joseph Wanton, who had loyalist sympathies, was deposed as governor at the beginning of the American Revolutionary War.

== See also ==
- List of colonial governors of Rhode Island
- Colony of Rhode Island and Providence Plantations
