= List of colonial governors of Rhode Island =

This is a list of the judges, presidents, and governors of the Colony of Rhode Island and Providence Plantations from 1638 to 1776.

== Governor of Providence ==
- Roger Williams June 1636 - September 1644

== Judges of Portsmouth ==
- William Coddington 7 March 1638 - 28 April 1639
- William Hutchinson 28 April 1639 - 14 March 1640

== Judge of Newport ==
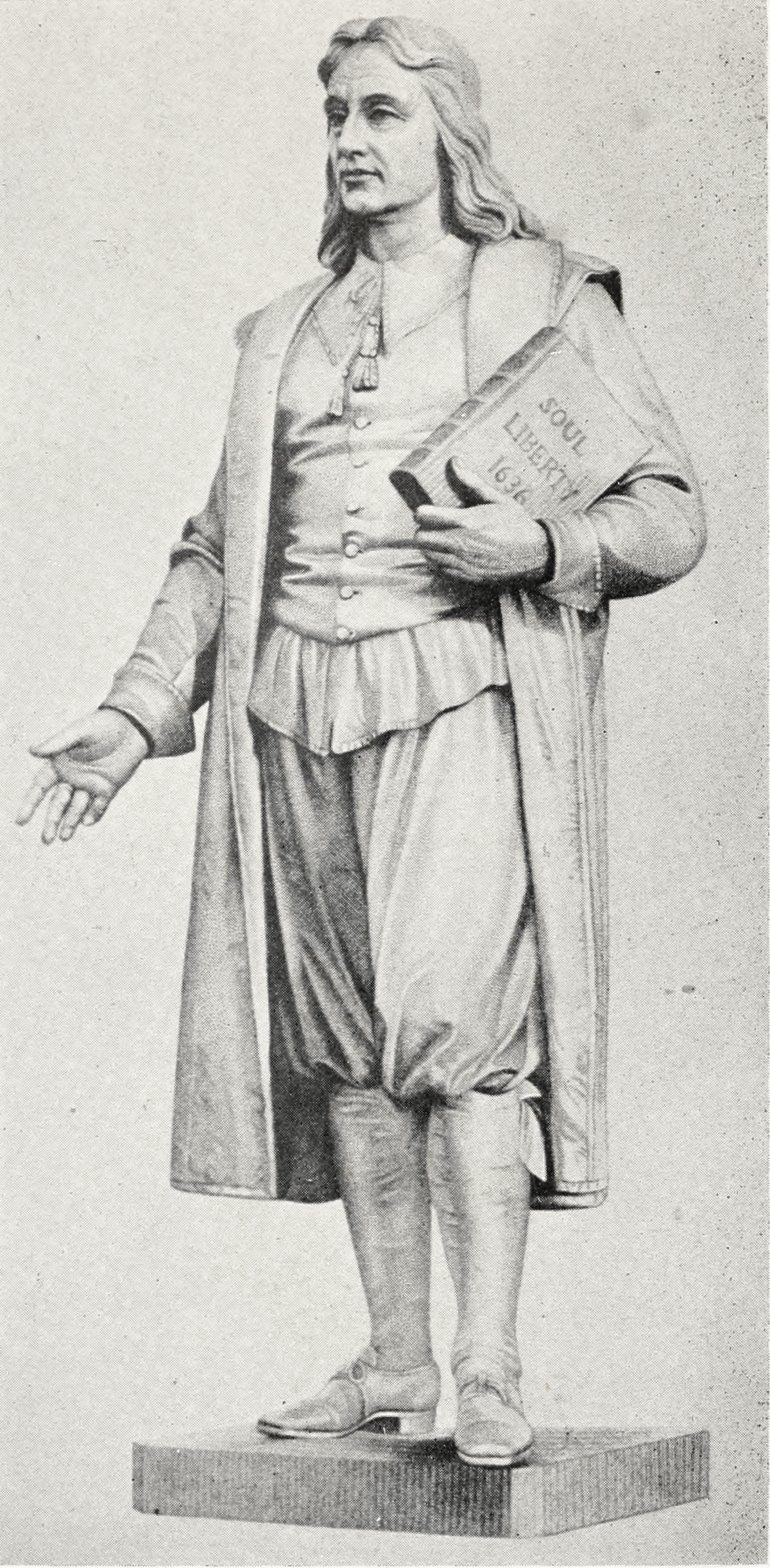
Roger Williams, founder of Rhode Island colony

- William Coddington 28 April 1639 - 14 March 1640

== Governor of Rhode Island (Portsmouth and Newport) ==
- William Coddington 14 March 1640 - 21 May 1647

== Chief Officer under the Patent of 1643 (Providence and Warwick) ==
- Roger Williams September 1644 - 21 May 1647

== Presidents under the Patent of 1643 ==
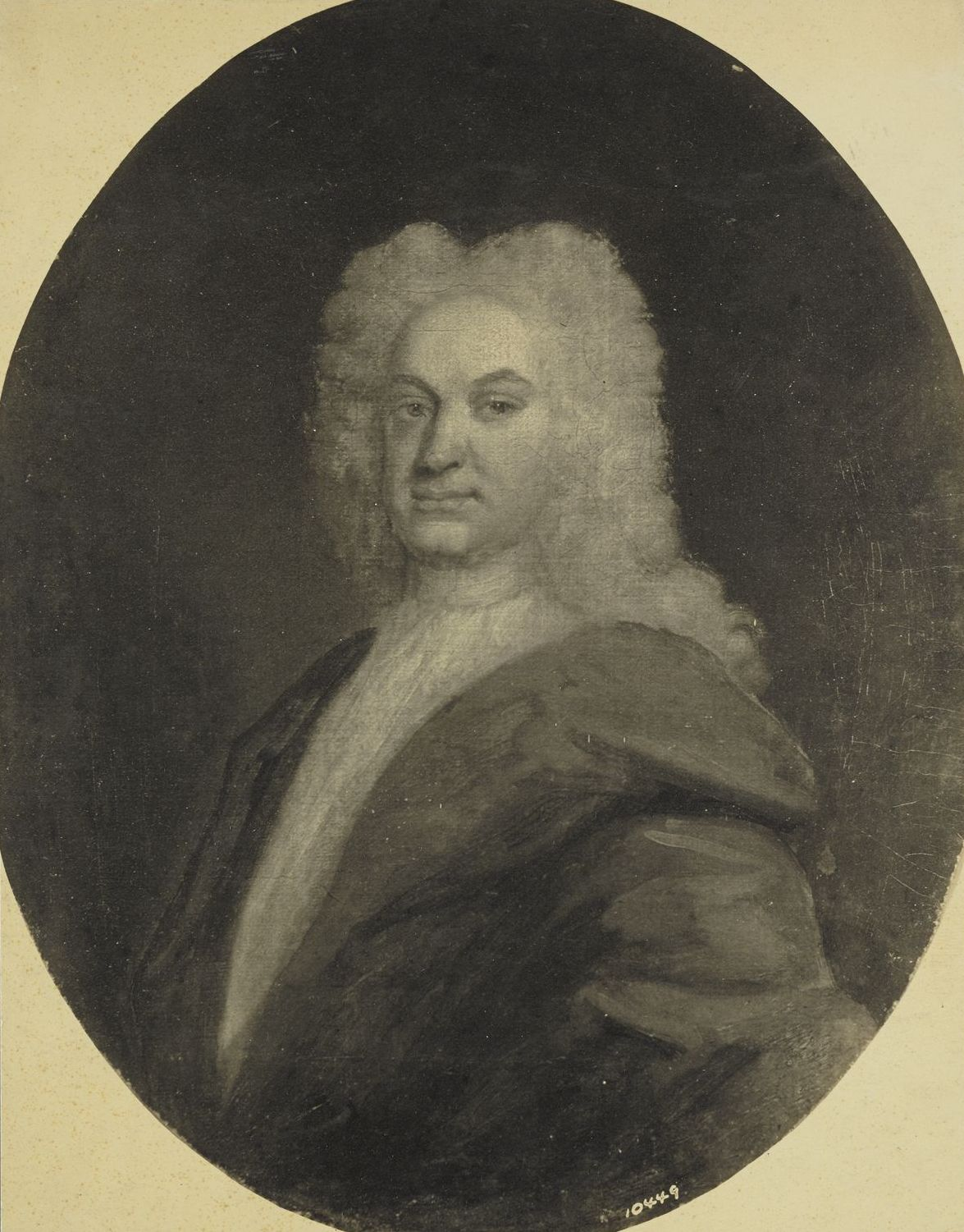
Joseph Jenckes

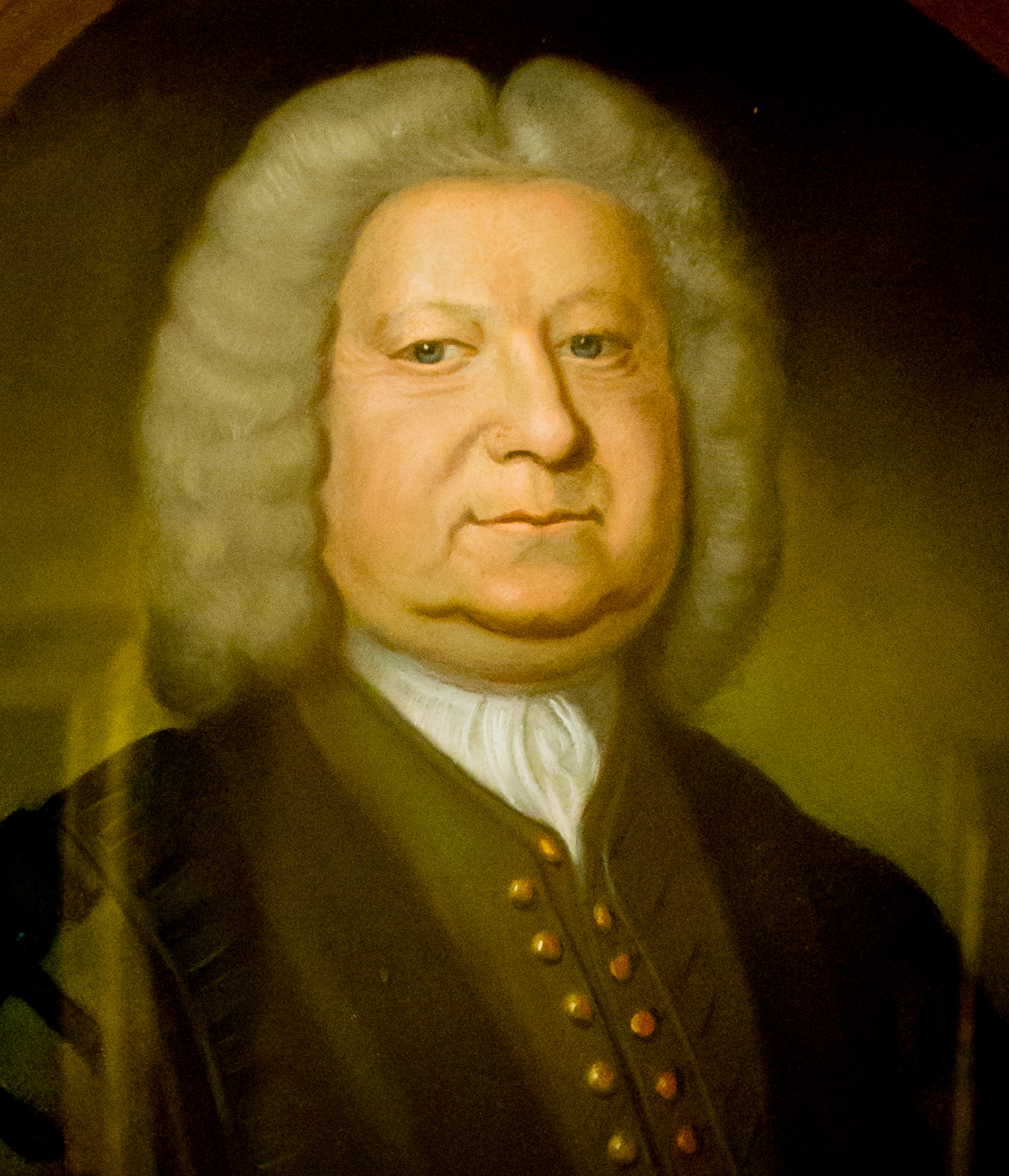
Richard Ward

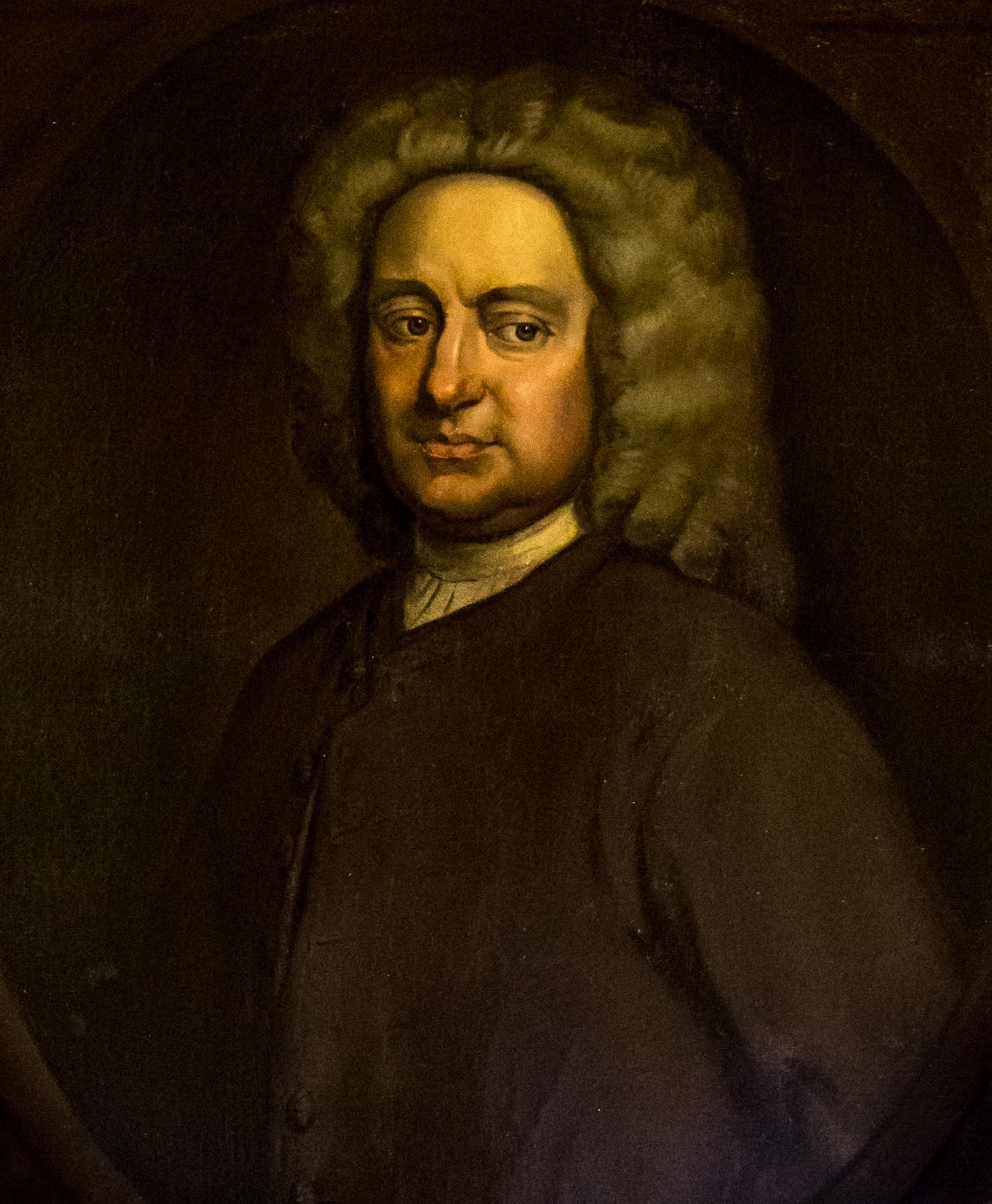
William Greene

- 1st John Coggeshall of Newport; 21 May 1647 - 27 November 1647 (died in office)
- 2nd Jeremy Clarke of Newport; 16 May 1648 - 22 May 1649
- 3rd John Smith of Providence; 22 May 1649 - 23 May 1650
- 4th Nicholas Easton of Newport; 23 May 1650 - August 1651 (resigned)
- 5th Samuel Gorton of Warwick; October 1651 - 18 May 1652 (Providence and Warwick only)
- 6th John Smith of Providence; 18 May 1652 - 17 May 1653 (Providence and Warwick only)
- 7th Gregory Dexter of Providence; 17 May 1653 - 16 May 1654 (Providence and Warwick only)
- 8th Nicholas Easton of Newport; 16 May 1654 - 12 September 1654
- 9th Roger Williams of Providence; 12 September 1654 - 19 May 1657
- 10th Benedict Arnold of Newport; 19 May 1657 - 22 May 1660
- 11th William Brenton of Newport; 22 May 1660 - 22 May 1662
- 12th Benedict Arnold of Newport; 22 May 1662 - November 1663

== Governors of Newport and Portsmouth under the Coddington Commission ==
- William Coddington of Newport; 20 May 1651 - 17 May 1653
- John Sanford of Portsmouth; 17 May 1653 - 1653 (died in office between June and November 1653)

== Governors under the Royal Charter of 1663 ==
- Benedict Arnold November 1663 - 2 May 1666
- William Brenton 2 May 1666 - 5 May 1669
- Benedict Arnold 5 May 1669 - 1 May 1672
- Nicholas Easton 1 May 1672 - 6 May 1674
- William Coddington 6 May 1674 - 3 May 1676
- Walter Clarke 3 May 1676 - 2 May 1677
- Benedict Arnold 2 May 1677 - 19 June 1678 (died in office)
- William Coddington 28 August 1678 - 1 November 1678 (died in office)
- John Cranston 8 November 1678 - 12 March 1680 (died in office)
- Peleg Sanford 16 March 1680 - 2 May 1683
- William Coddington Jr. 2 May 1683 - 6 May 1685
- Henry Bull 6 May 1685 - 5 May 1686
- Walter Clarke 5 May 1686 - 20 December 1686 (superseded by Governor Andros)

== Governor of the Dominion of New England ==
The Rhode Island Charter was suspended from 1686-1689. During this time, Sir Edmund Andros served as Governor of the Dominion of New England, which included Rhode Island. Andros was deposed on April 18, 1689.

== Governors under the Royal Charter of 1663 (Post Dominion of New England) ==
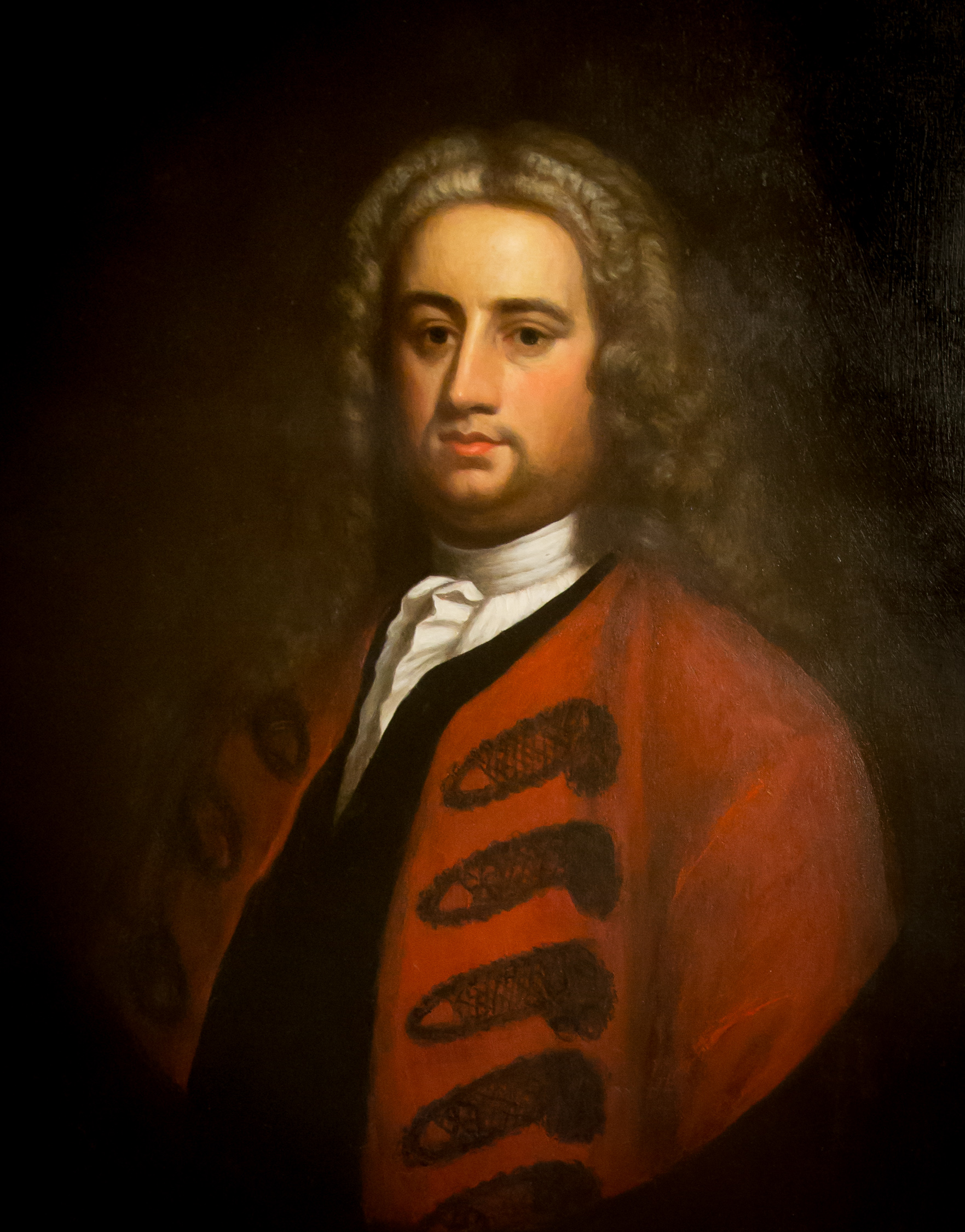
Joseph Wanton

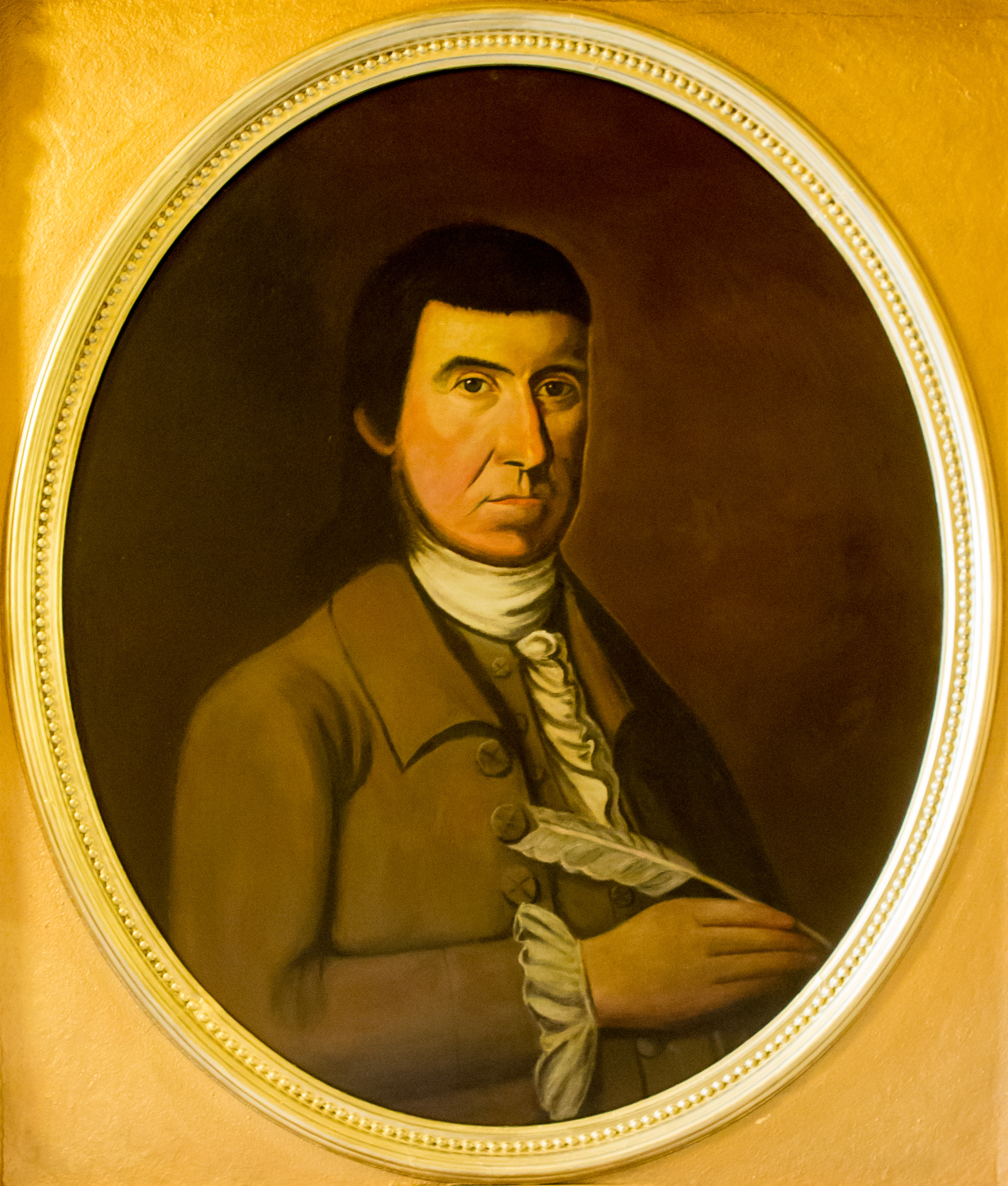
Nicholas Cooke

Vacant 20 December 1686 - 27 February 1690

- Henry Bull of Newport; 27 February 1690 - 7 May 1690
- John Easton of Newport; 7 May 1690 - 1 May 1695
- Caleb Carr of Jamestown; 1 May 1695 - 17 December 1695 (died in office)
- John Greene Jr. of Warwick (acting); 17 December 1695 - 6 May 1696
- Walter Clarke of Newport; 6 May 1696 - circa March 1698 (resigned)
- Samuel Cranston of Newport; circa March 1698 - 7 May 1727 (29 years 2 months.)
- Joseph Jenckes of Providence; 7 May 1727 - 7 May 1732
- William Wanton of Newport; 7 May 1732 - between 3 December 1733 and 4 February 1734 (died in office)
- John Wanton of Newport; 5 May 1734 - 5 July 1740 (died in office)
- Richard Ward of Newport (acting); 5 July 1740 - 15 July 1740
- Richard Ward of Newport; 15 July 1740 - 4 May 1743
- William Greene of Warwick; 4 May 1743 - 1 May 1745
- Gideon Wanton of Newport; 1 May 1745 - 7 May 1746
- William Greene of Warwick; 7 May 1746 - 6 May 1747
- Gideon Wanton of Newport; 6 May 1747 - 4 May 1748
- William Greene of Warwick; 4 May 1748 - 7 May 1755
- Stephen Hopkins of Providence; 7 May 1755 - 4 May 1757
- William Greene of Warwick; 4 May 1757 - 23 January 1758 (died in office)
- John Gardner of Newport (acting); 23 January 1758 - 13 March 1758
- Stephen Hopkins of Providence; 13 March 1758 - 5 May 1762
- Samuel Ward of Newport; 5 May 1762 - 4 May 1763
- Stephen Hopkins of Providence; May 1763 - 3 May 1765
- Samuel Ward of Newport; 3 May 1765 - 1 May 1767
- Stephen Hopkins of Providence; 1 May 1767 - 4 May 1768
- Josias Lyndon of Newport; 4 May 1768 - 3 May 1769
- Joseph Wanton of Newport; 3 May 1769 - 7 November 1775 (removed from office)
- Nicholas Cooke of Providence; 7 November 1775 - 6 May 1778

Note - the Rhode Island Royal Charter of 1663 remained in effect until the Constitution of Rhode Island was ratified in 1842. For a list of governors of Rhode Island from 1775 to the present see List of governors of Rhode Island.

== See also ==
- List of governors of Rhode Island
- List of lieutenant governors of Rhode Island
