= Roland W. Robbins =

American archaeologist and historian (1908–1987)

Roland Wells Robbins
- Born: March 21, 1908; Worcester, Massachusetts, US
- Died: February 8, 1987 (aged 78); Lincoln, Massachusetts, US
- Occupation: Archaeologist

Roland Wells Robbins (March 21, 1908 – February 8, 1987) was an American archaeologist, author, and historian who is known for discovering the site of Henry David Thoreau's house at Walden Pond. His other discoveries include the Saugus Iron Works and the John and Priscilla Alden Family Sites.

== Early life ==
Robbins was born on March 21, 1908, in Worcester, Massachusetts. He dropped out of high school in 1924 and went to work as an office boy at R.G. Dun & Co. He later worked for two employment agencies and was manager of the Boston Reference Bureau. During the Great Depression, Robbins was unable to find steady work, working as a handyman, house painter, and window-washer. He moved to Vermont. While there he collected tales and stories from local newspapers that he used to form the basis of his first book, Thru the Covered Bridge. He returned to the Boston area in 1934 and moved to Lincoln, Massachusetts, in 1936.

In 1942, while washing windows, Robbins engaged in a discussion on Daniel Chester French's statue, The Minute Man. The statue was being reproduced across the country as a national symbol during World War II, but little was known about the statue or its creator. He began researching and in 1945 he published Story of the Minute Man.

== Archaeology ==
=== Thoreau site ===
On July 4, 1945, the 100th anniversary of Henry David Thoreau's first day at Walden Pond, Robbins decided to look for the site of Thoreau's cabin. He used Walden and notes on the house by William Ellery Channing as a reference. On November 12, 1945, he located the chimney foundations of Thoreau's house in Concord, Massachusetts. He began lecturing on his discovery and documented it in his book Discovery at Walden. In 1964, Robbins reproduced Thoreau's cabin in his backyard and opened the building to the public. Robbin's replica was visited by hundreds of people, including P. B. Gajendragadkar, Toshi, and Pete Seeger.

=== Saugus Iron Works ===
In September 1948, First Iron Works Association president J. Sanger Attwill approached Robbins about trying to find the site of the Saugus Iron Works. Robbins was interested in the idea of digging at a site that was over three hundred years old, the challenge of working on a site where there little information, including no plans or sketches, and the opportunity to work at what may have been the first iron-manufacturing plant in the American colonies. Robbins' excavations uncovered the major manufacturing units of the Iron Works, including the foundations of buildings, remains of the blast furnace, holding ponds, and canal, a 500-pound hammer used in the forge, and a waterwheel that powered the bellows for the blast furnace, along with its wheel pit. In total, more than 5,000 artifacts were found.

Robbins abruptly left the Iron Works in 1953, not long after a dispute with Quincy Bent of the American Iron and Steel Institute (the financial backer of the project), who wanted Robbins to give tours of the excavation site on weekends in addition to his other duties. Robbins also clashed with the project's architects, who he thought were ignorant about and uninterested in archeological data, and was upset with the FIWA's decision to base the reconstruction of the Iron Works primarily on documentary, rather than archeological, evidence.

=== Other work ===
Robbins also discovered the sites of the John and Priscilla Alden home in Duxbury, Massachusetts, the remains of Thomas Jefferson's birthplace in Shadwell, Virginia, Fort Crown Point, Sterling Iron Works in Tuxedo, New York, duPont's Powder Rolling Mills in Wilmington, Delaware, the Sleepy Hollow Restorations in Tarrytown, New York, Samuel Parris's parsonage in Danvers, Massachusetts, John Winthrop Jr. Iron Furnace Site in Quincy, Massachusetts, mill sites in Moore State Park, and a Revolutionary War encampment site on Talcott Mountain. In 1967 he was commissioned by the town of Middleboro, Massachusetts, to clear and restore the Oliver Mills.

In 1947, Robbins purchased 1,230 negatives of Herbert W. Gleason, a photographer who took several thousand pictures of areas frequented by Thoreau. His collection of Gleason's work eventually grew to 6,000 pieces. Robbins displayed these works in his Thoreau-Walden Room.

Robbins died on February 8, 1987, at his home in Lincoln.
