= Obadiah Holmes =

English colonist in North America (1606–1682)

- Born: 1606; Didsbury, Lancashire, England
- Died: 15 October 1682 (aged 75–76); Newport, Colony of Rhode Island and Providence Plantations
- Resting place: Holmes Cemetery, Middletown, Rhode Island
- Education: Sufficient to write extensive accounts of his early life and religious development
- Occupations: Manufacturer of glass; minister
- Spouse: Katherine Hyde
- Children: John, Jonathan, Mary, Martha, Samuel, Obadiah, Lydia, John, Hopestill
- Parent(s): Robert Hulme and Katherine Johnson

Obadiah Holmes (1606 – 15 October 1682) was an early settler in the English Colony of Rhode Island and Providence Plantations, and a Baptist minister who was whipped in the Massachusetts Bay Colony for his religious beliefs and activism. He became the pastor of the Baptist Church in Newport, a position he held for 30 years.

Born in 1606 near Manchester, England, he grew up in a family where several of his brothers were sent to college at Oxford, but he was somewhat wild in his youth, and saw his rebelliousness as being a cause of his mother's death. He was married at the age of 20, and several years later emigrated from England to settle in Salem in the Massachusetts Bay Colony. He and two others began a glass making business there, but by 1645, perhaps due to religious friction, he moved to Rehoboth in the Plymouth Colony.

Religious differences evolved between himself and Samuel Newman, the pastor of the Rehoboth church, and Holmes eventually became the leader of a small faction within the church sometimes called the "Schismists." In 1650, he and others were taken to court for their religious views and practices, and compelled to leave the colony. He settled in Newport in the Rhode Island colony, and soon befriended John Clarke and John Crandall. In July 1651, these three men, while visiting an elderly friend in Lynn, Massachusetts, were apprehended, tried, and given exorbitant fines for their religious practices. Friends paid the fines for Clarke and Crandall, but when Holmes learned of this, he refused to allow them to pay his fine. Six weeks after trial he was taken to the whipping post in Boston and given 30 strokes, which were laid on so harshly, that for weeks afterward Holmes could only sleep while on his knees and elbows.

The year after this punishment, Holmes became the pastor of the Baptist church in Newport, and continuously held that position for 30 years, until his death in 1682. Holmes and his wife Katharine had nine known children, eight of whom survived to adulthood. He was an ancestor of the sixteenth United States President, Abraham Lincoln.

== Ancestry and life in England ==
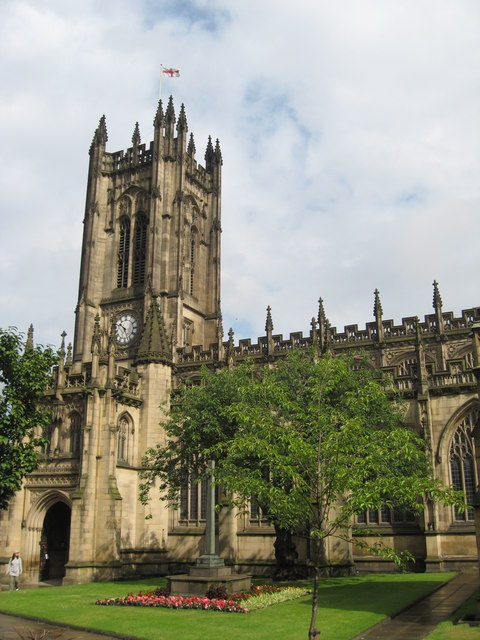
Collegiate church of Manchester where Holmes married Katharine Hyde in 1630

Baptized in Didsbury, Lancashire, England on 18 March 1609/10, Obadiah Holmes was the son of Robert Hulme (baptized 18 August 1578), a husbandman living in Reddish, Lancashire, and the grandson of an earlier Robert Hulme who was buried at Stockport on 14 January 1604/5. His mother's name was Katherine Johnson and she married his father at Stockport on 8 October 1605. While Holmes' birth date is widely given as about 1607, based on his own recollection (on 20 December 1675, he called himself aged 69, "there or thereabouts") baptisms during that timeframe, almost without exception, took place within a week of a birth, and the baptismal date is considered far more reliable than the memory of an old man. Holmes was married at the Collegiate church of Manchester on 20 November 1630 to Katherine Hyde. His two brothers, Samuel and John, attended Brasenose College in Oxford, and Samuel received his Bachelor of Arts degree there in 1636. In his writings, Holmes mentions another brother, Robert, but it is not clear whether it was Obadiah or Robert who attended college in Oxford as the third of three sons of his parents who went there. Most early writers on the subject assume that Holmes had spent some time at Oxford.

In a 1675 writing about his early life, Holmes is very revealing about his character as a youth, writing, "Three sons they [his parents] brought up aright to the university at Oxford but the most of their care was to inform and to instruct them in the fear of the Lord and to that end gave them much good counsell [sic], bringing them often before the Lord by earnest prayer, but I the most rebellious of all did neither harken to counsel nor any instruction, for from a child I minded nothing but folly, and vanity... I was not only rebellious against my parents but against the Lord...continuing in such a course for four or five years... my rebellion to my honored parents then looked me in open face, and my dear mother being sick it struck me my disobedience caused her death, which forced me to confess the same to her, my evil ways and danger."

== Massachusetts and Plymouth Colonies ==
In 1638, Holmes, with his wife and possibly son Jonathan, sailed from Preston on the River Ribble in Lancashire to Boston in the Massachusetts Bay Colony. Soon after landing at Boston in the summer or early fall of 1638, he and his family made their way up the coast and settled at Salem. On 21 January 1639 Holmes received an acre of land for a house and a promise of ten more acres "to be laid out by the town." Two months later, on 24 March 1639, he and his wife were admitted to the Salem church.

On 11 December 1639, he had another two acres granted, being called one of the "glassmen" of the town, and this is where he and two others manufactured glass. The young Salem settlement encouraged Holmes and his co-workers in the development of what may have been the first glass factory in North America, by giving them a loan of 30 pounds. As late as the 1880s, pieces of glass from this original source were said to be in existence.

By 30 June 1644, Holmes was associated with the town of Rehoboth in the Plymouth Colony when he received a wood lot in a division of land. He sold his holdings in Salem by 1645, removing himself and his family to Rehoboth the same year, and becoming a member of Reverend Samuel Newman's church. In Rehoboth he was elevated to the status of freeman in 1648, but his religious views placed him in conflict with Newman. In 1649, Holmes took Newman to court for slander, setting damages at 100 pounds. Newman had accused Holmes of taking false oath in court, but later admitted doing this based on the claims of others rather than his own knowledge. Holmes became the leader of a small faction within the church, known as the "Schismatists," and by 1650, he and eight others had separated from the church and were baptized, with Holmes becoming their pastor. On 2 October of that year he was presented by the Grand Jury for "continuing of meeting upon the Lord's Day from house to house, contrary to order of this court." Members of the court indicting Holmes included Governor William Bradford, Captain Miles Standish, and John Alden, gentleman. As a consequence of the court action, he and the others left Rehoboth to settle in Newport in the Colony of Rhode Island and Providence Plantations.

== Religious persecution ==
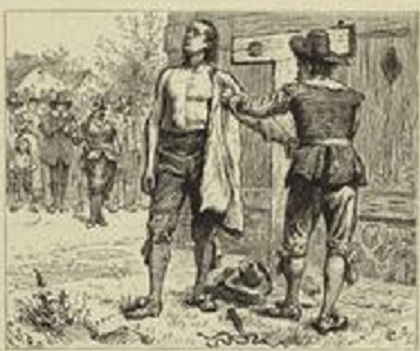
Holmes being defiant prior to being publicly whipped in Boston, 1651 (from an 1881 engraving by Charles Reinhart)

In Newport Holmes became associated with John Clarke, and John Crandall, and with the Newport church. In 1651 William Witter, an elderly member of their congregation living in Lynn, Massachusetts, was too infirm to come to Newport, so the three men visited him on 21 July. While Mr. Clarke was preaching to Witter and a small group assembled at his house, two constables arrived, arrested the three men for their religious beliefs and activity, and had them imprisoned in Boston the following day. One week later their trial began, with the members of the court being Governor John Endecott, Deputy Governor Thomas Dudley, Richard Bellingham, William Hibbins, and Increase Nowell. The guilt of the defendants was assumed, and any defense on their part was stifled. Even the Reverend John Cotton weighed in with denunciation for the prisoners, and the Reverend John Wilson struck a blow to Holmes while he was supposedly in the protection of the court.

The result of the trial was that Holmes was fined 30 pounds, Clarke was fined 20, and Crandall five. Clarke protested their heavy fines and Governor John Endecott replied that Clarke "deserved death" and "was worthy to be hanged." Friends quickly raised the money to pay the fines for Clarke and Crandall, but as soon as Holmes discovered what was happening, he forbade the payment of his fine, as a matter of conscience. On 5 September 1651 Holmes was taken to the town's whipping post, and given 30 lashes with a three-corded whip. Writing later about the event, Holmes related "...having joyfulness in my heart, and cheerfulness in my countenance...I told the magistrates, 'You have struck me as with roses.'" While he claimed to have felt no pain during the incident, he was so cruelly whipped that his companion, Dr. Clarke, wrote, "that in many days, if not some weeks, he could take no rest, but as he lay upon his knees and elbows, not being able to suffer any part of his body to touch the bed whereon he lay." Much later, Rhode Island's Governor Joseph Jenckes wrote, "Those who have seen the scars on Mr. Holmes' back (which the old man was wont to call the marks of the Lord Jesus), have expressed a wonder that he should live."

The authorities issued a new warrant to re-arrest Holmes, but his friends "defeated the purpose...by spiriting him away." Shortly after the incident, Roger Williams wrote a letter to Governor Endecott, making an earnest plea for toleration in matters of conscience and religion, but the letter failed to accomplish its objective. Holmes returned to Newport and when Dr. Clarke left for England in late 1651, Holmes succeeded him as minister of the First Baptist Church in Newport, and he held this position continuously (sharing the position when Clarke returned) until his death 30 years later.

== Later life ==
In 1665 Holmes was one of 12 persons named in a patent from the Duke of York for the Monmouth grant in East Jersey, which encompassed parts of Monmouth, Middlesex and ocean Counties. The date of the patent was 8 April 1665, and while Holmes never lived here, some of his children did settle in this area. In 1675 Holmes wrote a series of accounts about his life, one addressed to his wife, one to his children, and one to his friends and congregants. These accounts have been found and transcribed, and can be found in the genealogical account by J. T. Holmes.

Holmes was so highly regarded in the Rhode Island colony, that during the devastation of King Phillips War in 1676, the General Court put out a request for the "advice and concurrence of the most judicious inhabitants" of the colony. Among the 16 prominent Rhode Islanders named was Obadiah Holmes.

Holmes wrote his will on 9 April 1682, with Edward Thurston and Weston Clarke (son of Governor Jeremy Clarke) as witnesses. He died six months later, on 15 October, and was buried in his own field where his grave marker still stands. This Holmes burial ground, originally in the town of Newport, is now within the town of Middletown, Rhode Island.

== Family and descendants ==
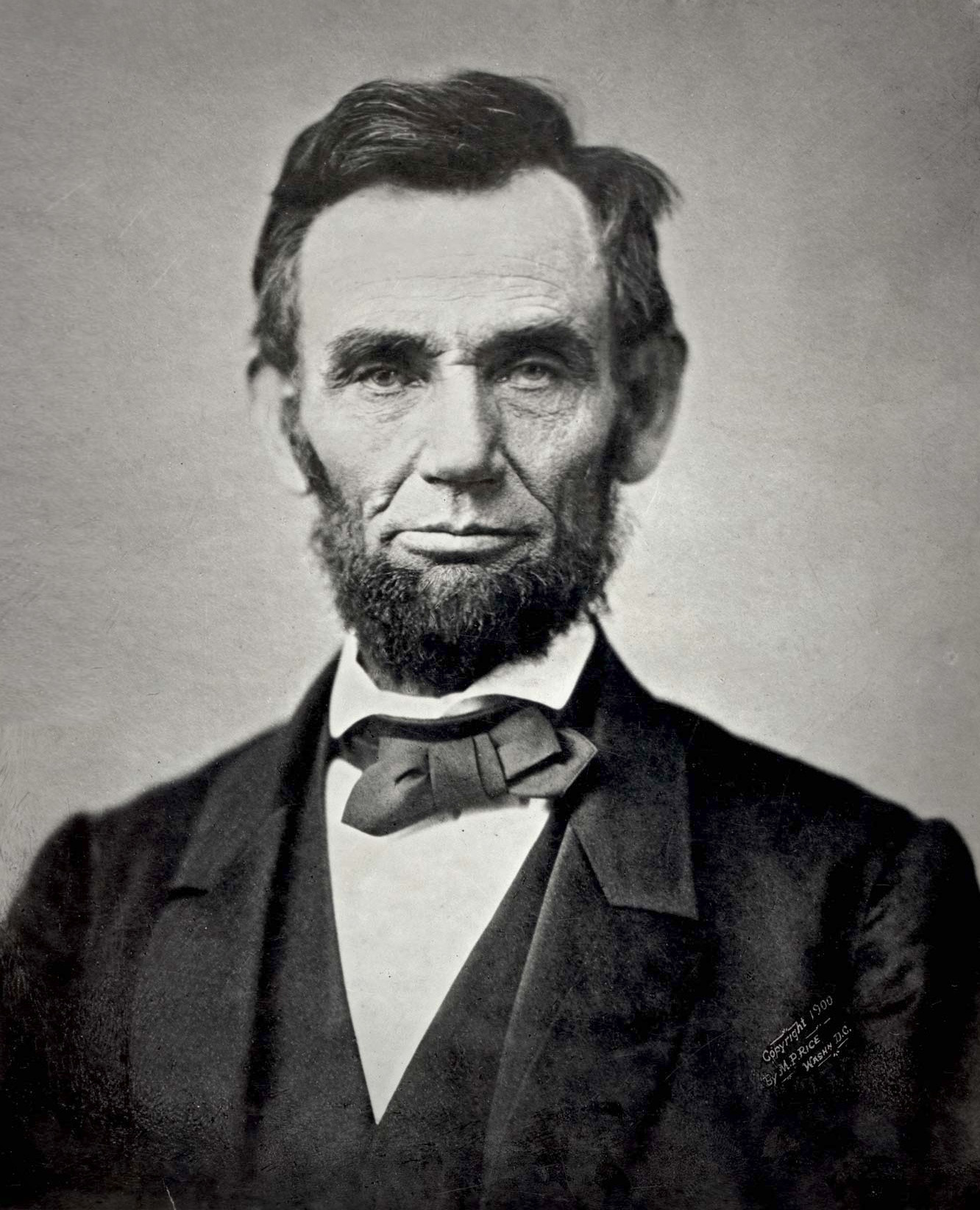
Abraham Lincoln was the most prominent descendant of Obadiah Holmes.

Obadiah and Katherine Holmes had nine known children, one of whom, the first John, died in England in 1633, with the remainder growing to maturity. Jonathan, thought to be born in England, married Sarah Borden, and was active in colonial affairs, becoming Speaker of the House of Deputies. Holmes' daughter Martha, born in 1640, married John Audley/Odlin, and his daughter Mary married John Brown, the son of early Baptist minister Chad Browne. His son Samuel settled in Gravesend, New York and married Alice Stillwell and his son Obadiah settled in Staten Island, New York. His son John married first Frances, the daughter of Randall Holden, and following her death married Mary Greene, the widow of William Greene, the daughter of John and Mary (Williams) Sayles, and the granddaughter of Roger Williams. John was for many years the General Treasurer of the colony, and he and Joseph Sheffield were empowered to lease and settle the ferries in the colony. Obadiah Holmes' other two children were Lydia who married John Bowne and Hopestill who married a Taylor.

Rhode Island Deputy Governor and Chief Justice John Gardner was a great grandson of Holmes, as was Deputy Governor Elisha Brown, but his best known descendant was United States President Abraham Lincoln, whose connection with Holmes was published by J. T. Holmes in his 1915 genealogy of the family.

=== Relation to Abraham Lincoln ===
United States President Abraham Lincoln is a lineal descendant of Obadiah Holmes. The line of descent is as follows:

- Obadiah Holmes (1606–1682) married Catherine Hyde (1608–1682)
- Lydia Holmes (1637-after 1693) married Captain John Bowne (c.1630-1684)
- Sarah Bowne (1669-after 1714) married Richard Salter, Esq. (1669-after 1728)
- Hannah Salter (1692-c.1727) married Mordecai Lincoln (1686–1736)
- John "Virginia John" Lincoln (1716–1788) married Rebecca Flowers (1720–1806)
- Captain Abraham Lincoln (1744–1786) married Bathsheba Herring (c.1750-c.1836)
- Thomas Lincoln (1778–1851) married Nancy Hanks (1784–1818)
- President Abraham Lincoln (1809–1865)

== Chronology of Obadiah Holmes ==
A chronology of his life appears below:

- 1610 baptized on 18 March 1609/10 at Didsbury, Lancashire, England.
- 1630 had spiritual awakening around this time; mother died; married Catherine Hyde at Collegiate Church, Manchester, Lancashire, England
- 1633 infant son buried in June at Stockport, England
- 1638 migrated to New England
- 1639 settled in Salem and received land grants
- 1640 joined and signed the covenant at First Church; daughter Martha baptized; father died
- 1641 served on a jury; also lodged a complaint against Richard Fowler
- 1642 son Samuel baptized; received additional land grants
- 1644 son Obadiah baptized; drew block of land by lot
- 1645 sold land in Salem and moved his family to Rehoboth (Seekonk)
- 1649 quarreled with Rev. Samuel Newman; set up separate church meetings; baptized by Pastor John Clark and Lucar
- 1650 summoned by the General Court of Plymouth
- 1651 left Rehoboth; moved family to Newport; arrested, tried, imprisoned, publicly flogged in Massachusetts for his Baptist beliefs
- 1652 assumed pastorate of Newport Church in John Clarke's absence; letters published in Clarke's Ill Newes
- 1655 served on grand jury; enrolled as freeman at Newport
- 1656 served as commissioner of Newport
- 1657 joined a mission with Samuel Hubbard to the Dutch on Long Island
- 1658 served on several juries
- 1662 witness to the land sale to Roger Williams
- 1668 detained by the constables of Charlestown at the home of Thomas Goold
- 1671 played a major role in the Seventh Day Baptist schism
- 1672 probably attended the debate between Roger Williams and the Newport Quakers
- 1675 wrote his Testimony
- 1676 spokesman for the Newport Church; advised the Rhode Island General Assembly
- 1681 deeded his farm to his son Jonathan and drew up his last will and testament
- 1682 died on 15 October

== See also ==
- Colony of Rhode Island and Providence Plantations
