= Joseph Jenckes Jr. =

Founder of Pawtucket, Rhode Island, and second Speaker of the House of Deputies

2nd Speaker of the House of Deputies (now Representatives) in the Rhode Island General Assembly
- In office October 1698 – February 1699
- Preceded by: Jonathan Holmes
- Succeeded by: Benjamin Newberry

Assistant (now Senator) in the Rhode Island General Assembly
- In office 1680-1686, 1689-1691, 1695, 1696, 1698

Deputy (now Representative) in the Rhode Island General Assembly
- In office 1679, 1680, 1698, 1691
- Constituency: Providence

Personal details
- Born: October 12, 1628 (baptized) Colnbrook, Middlesex, England
- Died: January 4, 1717 (aged 88) Providence (now Pawtucket), Colony of Rhode Island and Providence Plantations
- Spouse: Esther Ballard
- Children: 9 including Gov. Joseph Jenckes
- Parents: Joseph Jenckes Sr. (father); Joan Hearne (mother)
- Occupation: Forge and sawmill owner
- Known for: Founder of Pawtucket

Joseph Jenckes Jr. (baptized October 12, 1628 – January 4, 1717), also spelled Jencks and Jenks, was the founder of Pawtucket, Rhode Island, where he erected a forge in 1671.

After his mother and only sibling died in England, his father, Joseph Jenckes Sr., immigrated to New England. A few years later, in about 1647, Jenckes Jr. joined his father at his forge in Massachusetts Bay Colony and learned his father's trade. In 1661, Jenckes was jailed for treason, a charge that was later dropped.

Jenckes moved to the Colony of Rhode Island and Providence Plantations where he became a successful businessman. He served many years in the Rhode Island General Assembly and was elected Speaker of the House. His son, Joseph, became the colony's governor.

== Early life ==
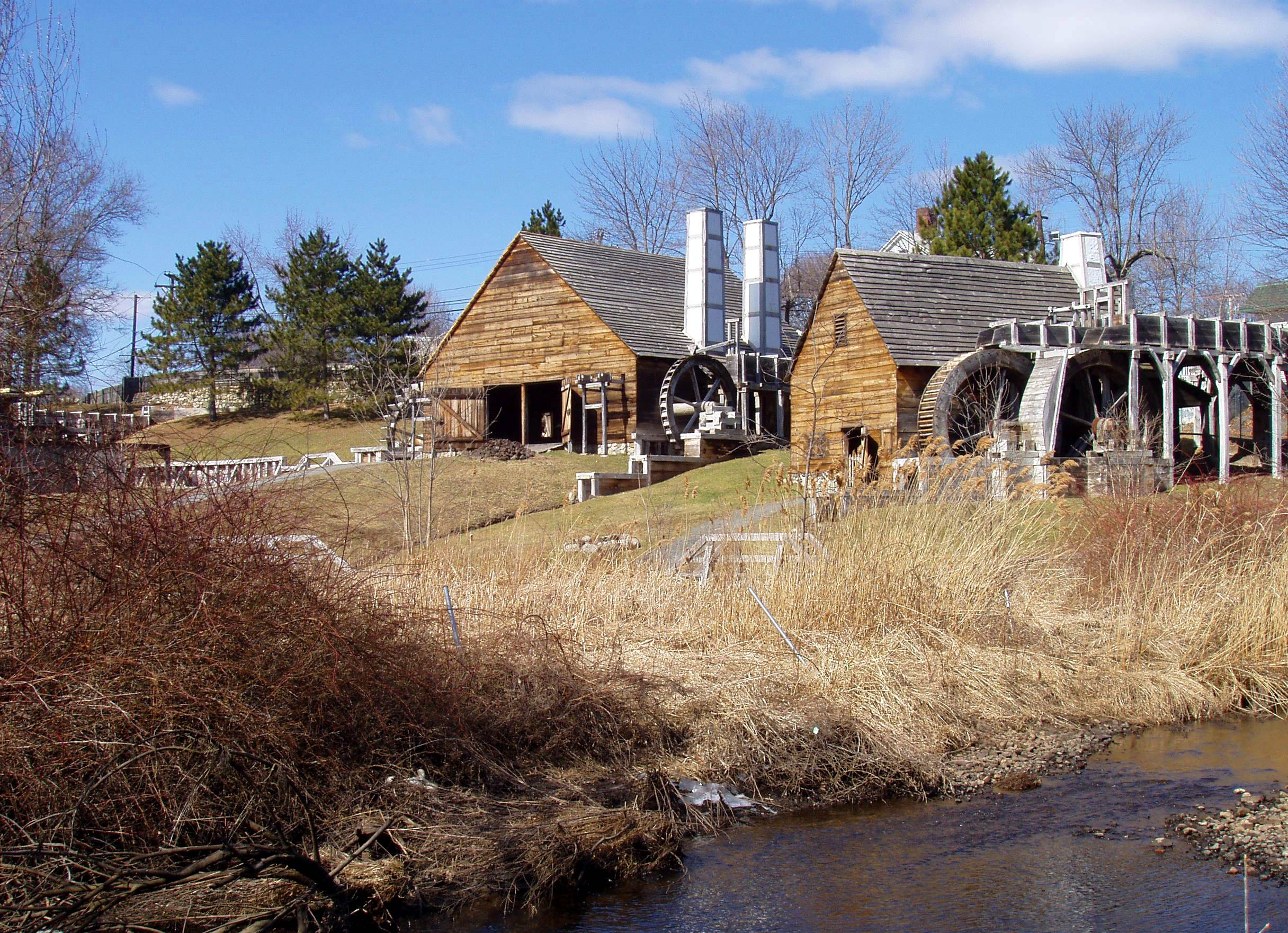
Saugus Iron Works—reconstructed forge and mill

Joseph Jenckes Jr. was baptized October 12, 1628, in Colnbrook, Buckinghamshire, England. He was the eldest of two children born to Joseph Jenckes Sr. (1599–1683) and Joan Hearne (1607–1635). (Note: Some sources incorrectly give Joseph Jenckes Jr.'s birth year as 1632.)

In his youth he lived in Hounslow, Middlesex, where his father worked as a cutler in a sword factory. His mother died in 1635 and his only sibling, Elizabeth, died in 1638. About 1642, the widower Joseph Jenckes Sr. immigrated to New England and by 1645 he was working to establish an iron works, later called the Saugus Iron Works, at Hammersmith near Lynn in Massachusetts Bay Colony. By 1647, Jenckes Jr., who had remained in England, joined his father at the iron works.

== Imprisonment ==
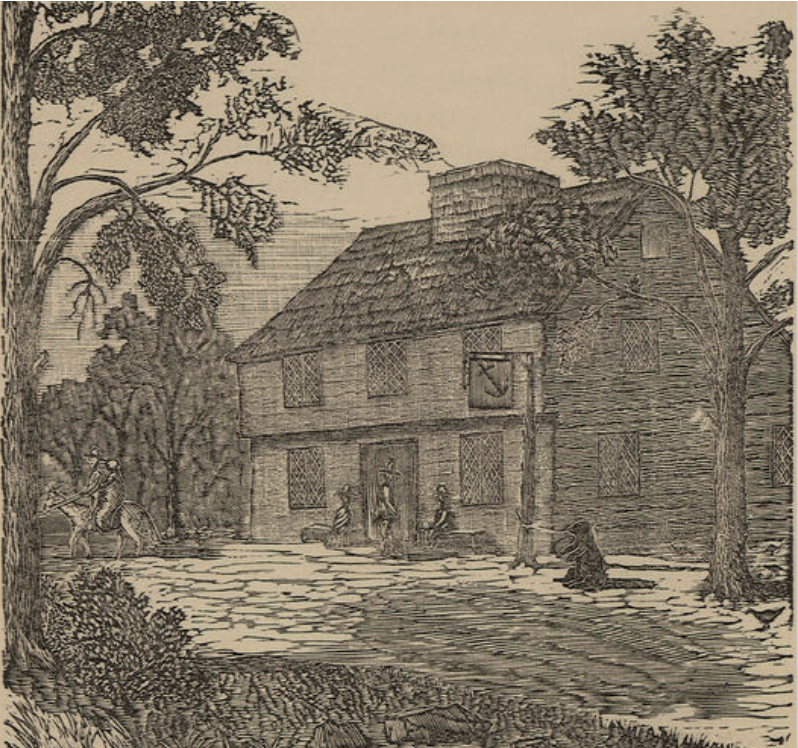
Old Anchor Tavern in Lynn, Massachusetts

Sometime before 1660, after working with his father at the Saugus Iron Works, Jenckes moved to Concord to work at an iron smelting operation. When he returned to Lynn it was alleged that he made treasonous remarks in the Anchor Tavern against King Charles II of England who was to be crowned on April 23, 1661. Jenckes was arrested and imprisoned. During his hearing on April 1, 1661, (Note: Several sources claim he was indicted in 1660, but more recent publications say it was 1661. The timing of the coronation supports the later date.) he was accused by Nicholas Pinion of saying that "if he hade the King heir, he wold cutte off his head and make a football of it" and by Thomas Tower of saying "I should rather that his head were as his father's rather than he should come to England to set up popery there," an allusion to the 1649 beheading of Charles I. After seven weeks in prison, on May 22, 1661, the General Court of Massachusetts Bay Colony ruled in Jenckes's favor, citing his subsequent statement supporting the king. The charges were dropped and he was released. The decision was recorded as follows:

Joseph Jencks, Juñ, being accused & bound ouer to this Court for high misdemeano^{r} in diuers treasonable words ag^{t} the kings maj^{ty}, w^{ch}, vpon examination, he vtterly disounes, neither doeth it appeare that the same cann be legally prooved a^{st} him, only in part, for w^{ch} he presenteth & pleadeth the kings gracious act of indempnity, this Court therefore dischardgeth him from his imprisonm̃t.

== Forge and sawmill owner ==
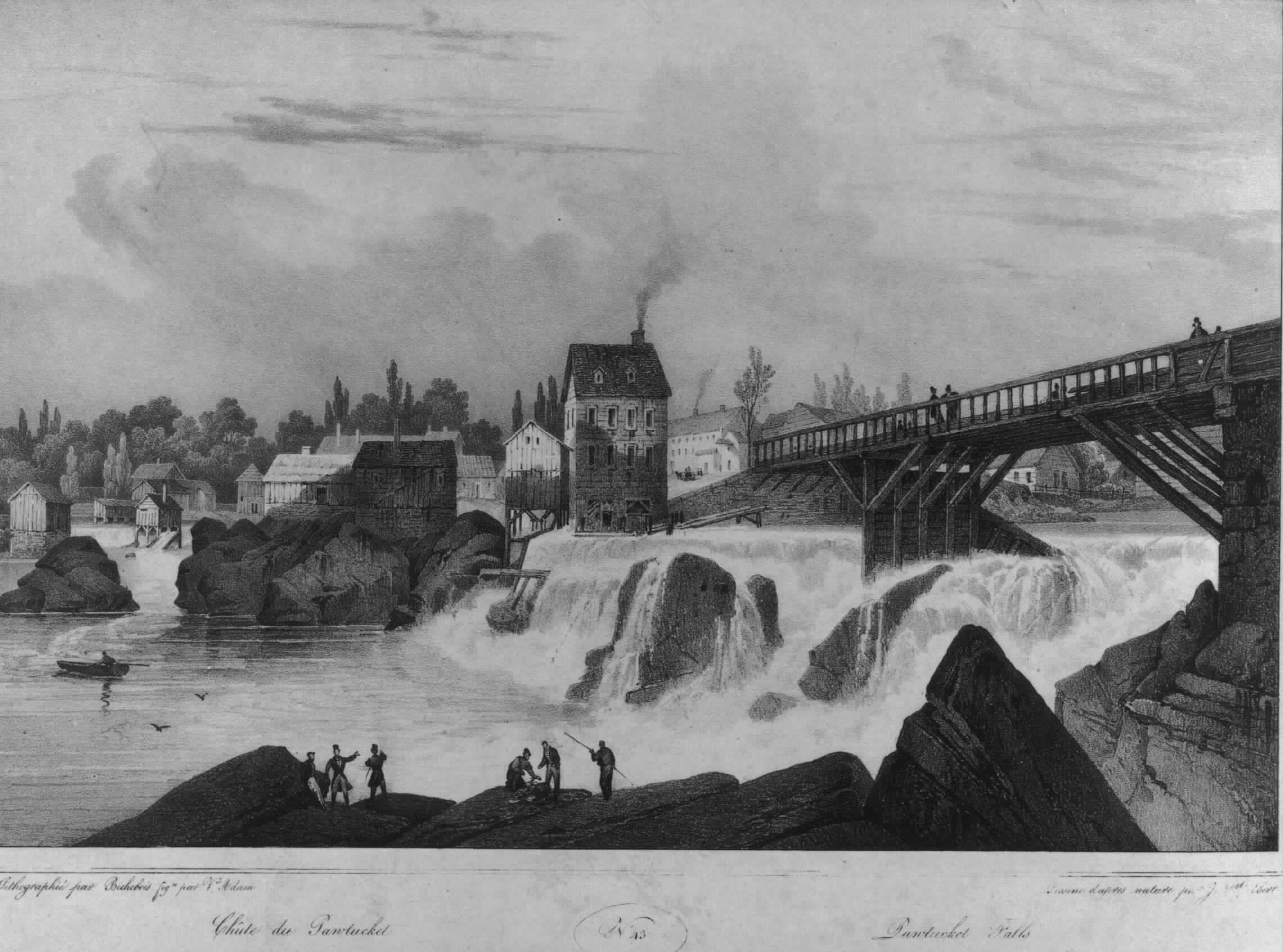
Pawtucket Falls, circa 1815

Sometime between 1661 and 1669, Joseph Jenckes Jr. moved to the Colony of Rhode Island and Providence Plantations. In 1669, he was granted timbered land on both sides of the Pawtuxet River in Pawtuxet—then southern Providence—where he erected a sawmill. His grant required him to provide lumber and timber rights to the proprietors.

In 1671, he moved to Pawtucket—then northern Providence—where he erected a forge and sawmill on the west side of present-day Blackstone River at Pawtucket Falls. A ready supply of bog iron ore nearby attracted him to the area. Jenckes initially purchased 60 acres from Abel and Rachel Potter and he received more than 100 acres of the commons between 1674 and 1685.

Jenckes's Pawtucket forge and home were burned down in 1676 during King Philip's War, which was the first major conflict between Native Americans and New England colonists. The residents received a warning before the attack and were able to escape. Later that year he returned to Pawtucket to rebuild his home and business.

== Pawtucket's founding ==
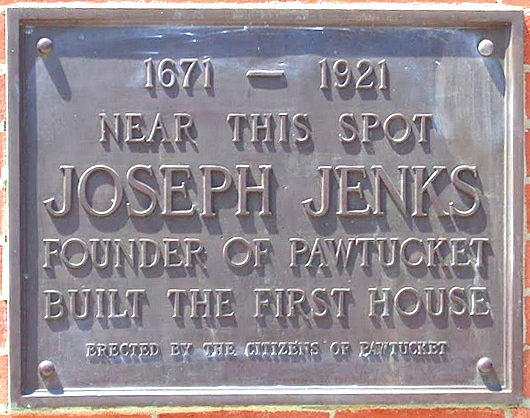
Joseph Jenckes/Jenks home marker at 53 East Avenue, Pawtucket

When Jenckes purchased land in 1671 at Pawtucket Falls on the west side of the Blackstone River, the village of Pawtucket did not yet exist. He was not the first landowner or settler in the area, however. Roger Williams had previously purchased the land in 1636 from the Narragansett people. When Jenckes arrived in rural northern Providence, several settlers including Ezekiel Holliman, Thomas Estance, John Smith, Gregory Dextor, Stukely Westcott, and Abel Potter owned land while Richard Scott and Daniel Comstack had built homes. But it was not until Jenckes built his forge and sawmill at the falls that this sparsely populated area become a village and eventually a center for metalworks and other trades.

Jenckes built his home and forge on the south side of today's Main Street at East Avenue in Pawtucket. The forge was situated near the present-day Main Street Bridge where the river drops 30 feet. The site of Jenckes's home is marked by a plaque on the Pawtucket Boys Club Building at 53 East Avenue.

Jenckes's business led to "additional industrial development on both sides of the river, including sawmills, grist mills, oil mills, potash manufacture, and shipyards." Pawtucket was incorporated in 1823 and both sides of the river were combined into a single Rhode Island town in 1885.

== Public service ==
Jenckes was made a freeman (voting citizen) of the Colony of Rhode Island and Providence Plantations in 1677. He subsequently held several offices in the local and colonial governments. He was a member of the Providence Town Council, served as a moderator at town meetings, was a tax assessor, and performed marriages. In 1679, 1680, and 1691 he was elected deputy (town representative) to the colony's General Assembly. For thirteen years between 1680 and 1698 he was elected assistant (colonial representative) to the General Assembly. During his tenure in 1696, the General Assembly created two chambers: the House of Deputies (town representatives) and the Upper House (the governor, deputy governor, and assistants). Two years later he was elected Speaker of the House of Deputies—now Speaker of the House of Representatives—and was only the second person to hold that office.

In 1690, Jenckes, along with six others, were selected to write an official communication on behalf of the colony to King William III and Queen Mary II congratulating them on their coronation and informing them of news in the colony. They informed the new monarchs that Sir Edmund Andros, the Governor of the Dominion of New England, had been arrested in the colony after a revolt against him in Boston.

== Family ==
Joseph Jenckes Jr. married Esther Ballard (1632–1717) in about 1655 at Lynn, Massachusetts Bay. She was the daughter of William and Elizabeth Ballard. The Ballard family had arrived in Boston in 1635 aboard the James sailing from London.

The Jenckeses had nine children: Joseph, b. 1656; Elizabeth, b. 1658; Sarah, b. 1660; Nathaniel, b. 1662; Esther, b. 1664; Ebenezer, b. 1668; Joanna, b. 1672; William, b. 1674; and Abigail, b. 1676. Several of his children had distinguished careers: Joseph was the 19th governor of the Colony of Rhode Island and Providence Plantations, Ebenezer was an ordained minister at the First Baptist Church, and William was a judge and assemblyman.

== Death and legacy ==
Joseph Jenckes Jr. died January 4, 1717, in northern Providence, now Pawtucket. Two Pawtucket schools were named in his honor. Joseph Jenks Jr. High School—formerly Pawtucket High School and now Doyle manor—was built in 1896 at 300 Broadway. Joseph Jenks Junior High School was opened in downtown Pawtucket in the 1920s and moved in the 1980s to 350 Division Street where it was renamed Joseph Jenks Middle School. The street called Jenks Way in Pawtucket is near Pawtucket Falls.
