= Herbert Gleason =

Herbert Gleason may refer to:

- Jackie Gleason (John Herbert Gleason, 1916–1987), American comedian, actor and musician
- Herbert P. Gleason (1928–2013), American lawyer
- Herbert Wendell Gleason (1855-1937), American photographer
