= Rowley Village Forge Site =

- U.S. National Register of Historic Places
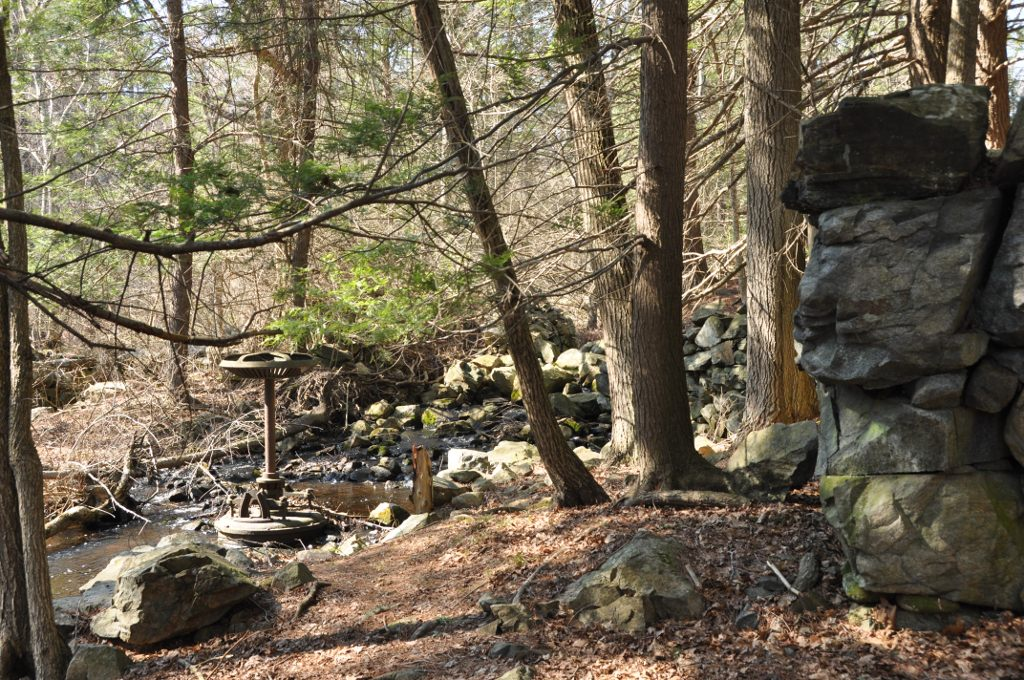
- Remnants of 19th century water-powered mill works

- Location within Massachusetts Location within the United States
- Nearest city: Boxford, Massachusetts
- Coordinates: 42°38′52″N 70°59′25″W
- Built: 1668
- Architect: Henry Leonard
- NRHP reference No.: 01000201
- Added to NRHP: March 2, 2001

The Rowley Village Forge Site is a historic colonia-era iron foundry site in Boxford, Massachusetts. The first iron forge in the area was established on Fish Brook in 1668 by Henry Leonard of the Leonard family, who were instrumental in the Saugus Iron Works further south. This business ran until about 1681, but the site also saw industrial uses into the 19th century, with sawmills and gristmills quickly replacing the foundry after it failed. Remnants of these works are visible from trails through conservation land off Lockwood Drive.

The site was added to the National Register of Historic Places in 2001.

== See also ==
- National Register of Historic Places listings in Essex County, Massachusetts
- List of the oldest buildings in Massachusetts
