= Richard Leader =

English businessman in North America (1609-1661)

- Born: 1609; England
- Died: 1661 (aged 51–52)
- Occupation: Businessman
- Known for: Manager of the first integrated ironworks in North America
- Spouse: Elizabeth Stacy (m. 1628)
- Children: 2 (Elizabeth Hole, Anna Clark)

Richard Leader (1609–1661) was an English businessman who was the first manager of the Saugus Iron Works, the first integrated ironworks in North America. He later engaged in business in Maine and Barbados.

== Early life ==
Leader was born in 1609. On October 11, 1628, he married Elizabeth Stacy of Uckfield. They had two children together. He was a merchant in Salehurst and engaged in trade between England and Ireland.

== Saugus Iron Works ==
It is unknown how Leader acquired his knowledge in metallurgy, but it is likely that he had some contact with the Irish ironmaking industry. In 1645, the Company of Undertakers for the Iron Works in New England hired Leader to replace John Winthrop the Younger as manager. He was given a seven-year contract with a salary of £100 a year from the Undertakers.

After arriving in Massachusetts, Leader reviewed site survey for the iron works in Braintree and looked into some other locations. He selected a location in Lynn (now part of present-day Saugus) on the Saugus River. The new iron works, which was called Hammersmith, began operations in 1646. Leader leased the site from Thomas Dexter for £40, until May 1647, when Leader bought him out. In 1650, Leader, who had encountered difficulties with the Undertakers, left the Iron Works and was replaced by John Gifford.

== Religion ==
In 1646, when Robert Child, Samuel Maverick, and William Vassall were imprisoned by the Massachusetts General Court for their petition for freedom of religion, they were confined to Leader's house. Child wrote that Leader had more "curious books than I, especially about Divinity businesses." In May 1651, Leader was found guilty of reproaching the church and government. He was fined £200, later reduced to £50. He made an acknowledgment and paid the fine.

== Maine and Barbados ==
After leaving the iron works, Leader attempted to mine copper at John Endecott's farm in Salem, Massachusetts (now part of present-day Topsfield). The business was not successful. In 1650, Leader moved to South Berwick, Maine (then part of Kittery), where he had been granted the exclusive right to use the Little River to erect mills. The sawmill, which had nineteen saws, was called the "Great Works" and did a great deal of business until it was stopped due to a legal dispute with the heirs of John Mason.

In 1652, Leader became a magistrate. When the Massachusetts Bay Colony extended their jurisdiction into the Province of Maine, Leader went to London to protest on behalf of the government of Edward Godfrey. On April 3, 1652, Leader purchased a house and farm in Strawbery Banke (New Hampshire) for £180. He sold the property in 1655 to the Cutts brothers. He was described by the Cutts as "brother Leader", so it is supposed that he was married to a member of that family by this time.

By 1656, Leader was in Barbados, where he engaged in sugar-refining and salt manufacturing. In a letter from 1660, he complained about the island's climate and stated that if it wasn't for the slave labor available in Barbados, he would prefer to reside in New England. He also wrote that he intended to leave "this western world" for Ireland, as he saw "no place either for profit or pleasure so good as Ireland", which was remarkable considering that conditions there following the Cromwellian war were very poor. Illness prevented Leader from leaving Barbados until the spring of 1661. He died in Kittery on December 27, 1661. He was survived by two daughters, Elizabeth Hole, who was killed by Native Americans on May 4, 1705, and Anna Clark of Portsmouth, New Hampshire, who lived until at least 1723.
