= Jonathan Holmes (speaker) =

1st Speaker of the Rhode Island House of Representatives
- In office October 1696 – October 1698
- Preceded by: Office established
- Succeeded by: Joseph Jenckes Jr.

4th Speaker of the Rhode Island House of Representatives
- In office April 1700 – May 1703
- Preceded by: Benjamin Newberry
- Succeeded by: Benjamin Barton

Personal details
- Born: 23 June 1633 Stockport, Lancashire, England
- Died: 10 October 1713 (aged 80) Newport, Rhode Island, British America
- Spouse: Sarah Borden (m. 1664; died 1705)
- Parent(s): Obadiah Holmes; Catharine Hyde

Captain Jonathan Holmes (23 June 1633 – 10 October 1713) was a colonial farmer and politician in Rhode Island.

== Early life ==
Holmes was born in Stockport, Lancashire, England on 23 June 1633. He was a son of the Rev. Obadiah Holmes (1606–1682) and Catharine (née Hyde) Holmes (c. 1610–c. 1682), who were married in Manchester in 1630. Among his siblings were Lydia Holmes, who married Capt. John Bowne (great-grandparents of Capt. Abraham Lincoln, himself grandfather of President Abraham Lincoln).

As a baby, he sailed with his parents from Preston on the River Ribble in Lancashire to Boston in the Massachusetts Bay Colony.

== Career ==
His father was one of the twelve patentees named in the original April 8, 1665 patent from the Duke of York for the Monmouth Tract embracing Monmouth County and parts of Middlesex and Ocean Counties in Eastern New Jersey.

In 1685, Holmes returned to the family home in Newport, Rhode Island. He was a member of the House of Deputies of the Colony of Rhode Island and Providence Plantations, and served as the first and fourth Speaker of the House.

== Personal life ==
On 17 April 1664, Holmes was married to Sarah Borden (1644–c. 1705) in Portsmouth, Rhode Island. She was a daughter of Richard Borden and Joan (née Fowle) Borden. Together, they were the parents of:

- Obadiah Holmes (1666–1745), who married Alice Ashton, a daughter of Rev. James Ashton and Deliverance (née Throckmorton) Ashton.
- Jonathan Holmes (1682–1766), who married Deliverance Ashton, sister to Obadiah's wife. After her death, he married Rebecca Throckmorton.
- Samuel Holmes (1676–c. 1769)
- Martha Holmes (1675–1729), who married Philip Tillinghast.

After his death in Newport, Rhode Island on 10 October 1713, he was buried in the family cemetery in Middletown.
