= Saugus Iron Works National Historic Site =

Historic ironworks in Saugus, Massachusetts

- U.S. National Register of Historic Places
- U.S. National Historic Landmark District
- U.S. National Historic Site
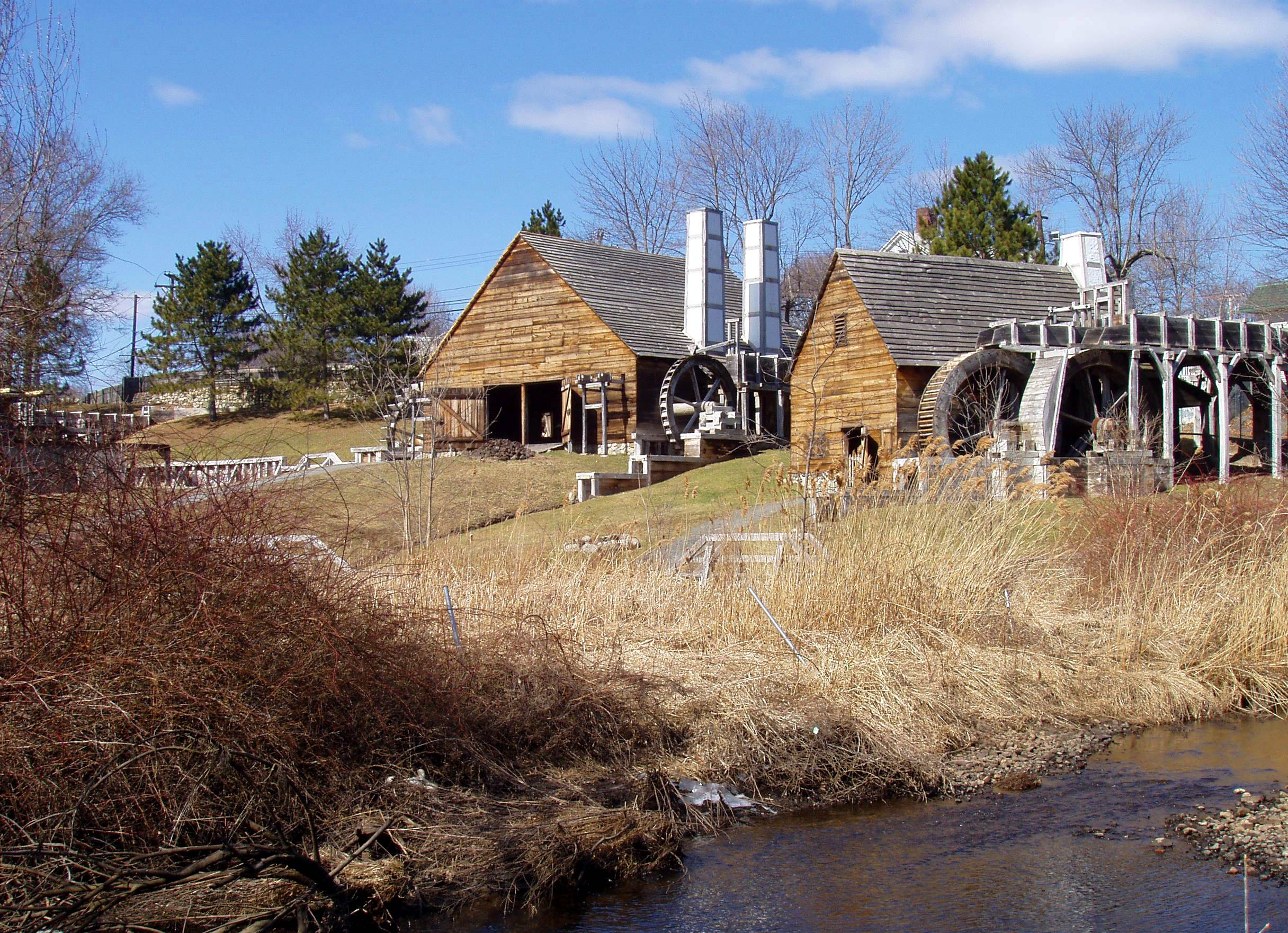
- Reconstructed forge and mill

- Location within Massachusetts Location within the United States
- Location: 244 Central Street, Saugus, Massachusetts
- Coordinates: 42°28′7″N 71°0′32″W
- Area: 9 acres (3.6 ha)
- Architect: Perry, Shaw & Hepburn, Kehoe & Dean
- Visitation: 51,495 (2025)
- Website: Saugus Iron Works National Historic Site
- NRHP reference No.: 66000047

Significant dates
- Added to NRHP: October 15, 1966
- Designated NHLD: November 27, 1963
- Designated NHS: April 5, 1968

Saugus Iron Works National Historic Site is a National Historic Site about 10 miles (16 kilometers) northeast of Downtown Boston in Saugus, Massachusetts. It is the site of the first integrated ironworks in North America, founded by John Winthrop the Younger and in operation between 1646 and approximately 1670. It includes the reconstructed blast furnace, forge, rolling mill, shear, slitter and a quarter-ton trip hammer.

The facility is powered by seven large waterwheels, some of which are rigged to work in tandem with huge wooden gears connecting them. It has a wharf to load the iron onto ocean-going vessels, as well as a large, restored 17th-century house.

== History ==
During the 17th century, iron was used to manufacture a number of indispensable goods, including nails, horseshoes, cookware, tools, and weapons. The production of iron required a complex manufacturing process that could only be done by an industrial enterprise. This process was not available in North America during the early years of English colonization, which meant that all iron goods had to be imported. As it took at least two months to sail to the nearest foundry, iron goods were very expensive.

Winthrop believed that because the colonies had a cheap and abundant supply of raw materials, an iron works in Massachusetts could produce goods that could be sold profitably in the New England and Chesapeake Colonies as well as in England itself. In 1641, Winthrop sailed to England to get the capital he needed to fund the enterprise. The Company of Undertakers for the Iron Workes [sic] in New England was founded to finance the project. Winthrop selected a site in Braintree, Massachusetts (now part of present-day Quincy, Massachusetts) as the location of the first Iron Works. Construction began in 1644 and was completed in 1645. On October 15, 1645, Winthrop secured the Undertakers an exemption from taxes and a 21-year monopoly on iron production from the Massachusetts General Court. The Braintree Iron Works, however, was unsuccessful due to a lack of iron ore in the area and an inadequate supply of water to power the machinery.

In 1645, the Undertakers wrote to Winthrop informing him that Richard Leader, a merchant from Salehurst who was familiar with the iron making process, would replace him as manager of the Iron Works. After arriving in Massachusetts, Leader reviewed the previous site survey and looked into some other locations. He selected a location on the Saugus River. The river was navigable for shallow draft vessels and could be dammed to power machinery. The surrounding forests could be used to make charcoal. Bog ore could be mined from nearby ponds, swamps, riverbeds, and bogs. Limestone, which was normally used for flux, was not available, but through trial and error it was found that gabbro, which could be mined in nearby Nahant, would work as a flux.

The new iron works, which was called Hammersmith, began operations in 1646. It consisted of a blast furnace for producing pig iron and gray iron (the later of which was poured into molds to make firebacks, pots, pans, kettles, and skillets), a forge where pig iron was refined into wrought iron and a 500-pound hammer was used to make merchant bars, which were sold to blacksmiths for manufacture into finished products, and a rolling and slitting mill where flat stock that could be used to manufacture nails, bolts, horse shoes, wagon tires, axes, saw blades, and other implements was produced. At the time, it was one of the most technologically advanced iron works in the world. Once functioning, the Iron Works ran for thirty weeks of the year and produced one ton of cast iron a day.

Skilled workers were brought over from England to ply their trade at the iron works. These emigrants did not fit in with the local Puritan society and often ran afoul of its laws. Many ironworkers were arrested for crimes such as drunkenness, adultery, gambling, fighting, cursing, not attending church, and wearing fine clothes. The less experienced local men who worked at the Iron Works met with frequent and sometimes fatal accidents. Another source of labor was indentured servants. Indentured servants typically worked at the Iron Works for three to seven years for little or no pay in exchange for their passage to Massachusetts and the provision of food, clothing, housing, and other necessities. Following the Battle of Dunbar in 1650, 60 Scottish prisoners of war were sent to the Iron Works to work as indentured servants. 35 or 37 of the 60 Scots intended for the Iron Works were employed there, while the remainder were sold for between 20 pounds and 30 pounds each to various interests in Massachusetts, New Hampshire, and Maine. The Scots mostly worked as unskilled laborers, performing tasks like chopping wood. Some learned skills such as making charcoal, blacksmithing and carpentry. Most Scots were able to gain their freedom after seven years and afterwards they remained in Massachusetts or moved to Maine, where they started families and assimilated into Puritan society.

In 1650, Leader, who had encountered difficulties with the Undertakers, left the Iron Works to go into the sawmill business. John Gifford and William Aubrey assumed management of the Iron Works, with Gifford serving as ironmaster and Aubrey doing the accounting.

Although the Iron Works produced a respectable quantity of iron, due to the high cost of labor, financial mismanagement which may have included embezzlement, and a number of lawsuits, it seldom operated at a profit. The Iron Works closed around 1670.

== Site reconstruction and restoration ==
After the iron works closed, the site fell into disuse and became hidden by underbrush. In 1898, the Lynn Historical Society erected a historical marker near the site which read "The First Iron Works. The first successful iron works in this country established here. Foundry erected in 1643. Joseph Jenckes built a forge here in 1647 and in 1652 made the dies for the first silver money coined in New England. In 1654 he made the first fire engine in America." Eventually, the plaque too became obscured by the underbrush and remained camouflaged until it was discovered during the restoration of the Iron Works.

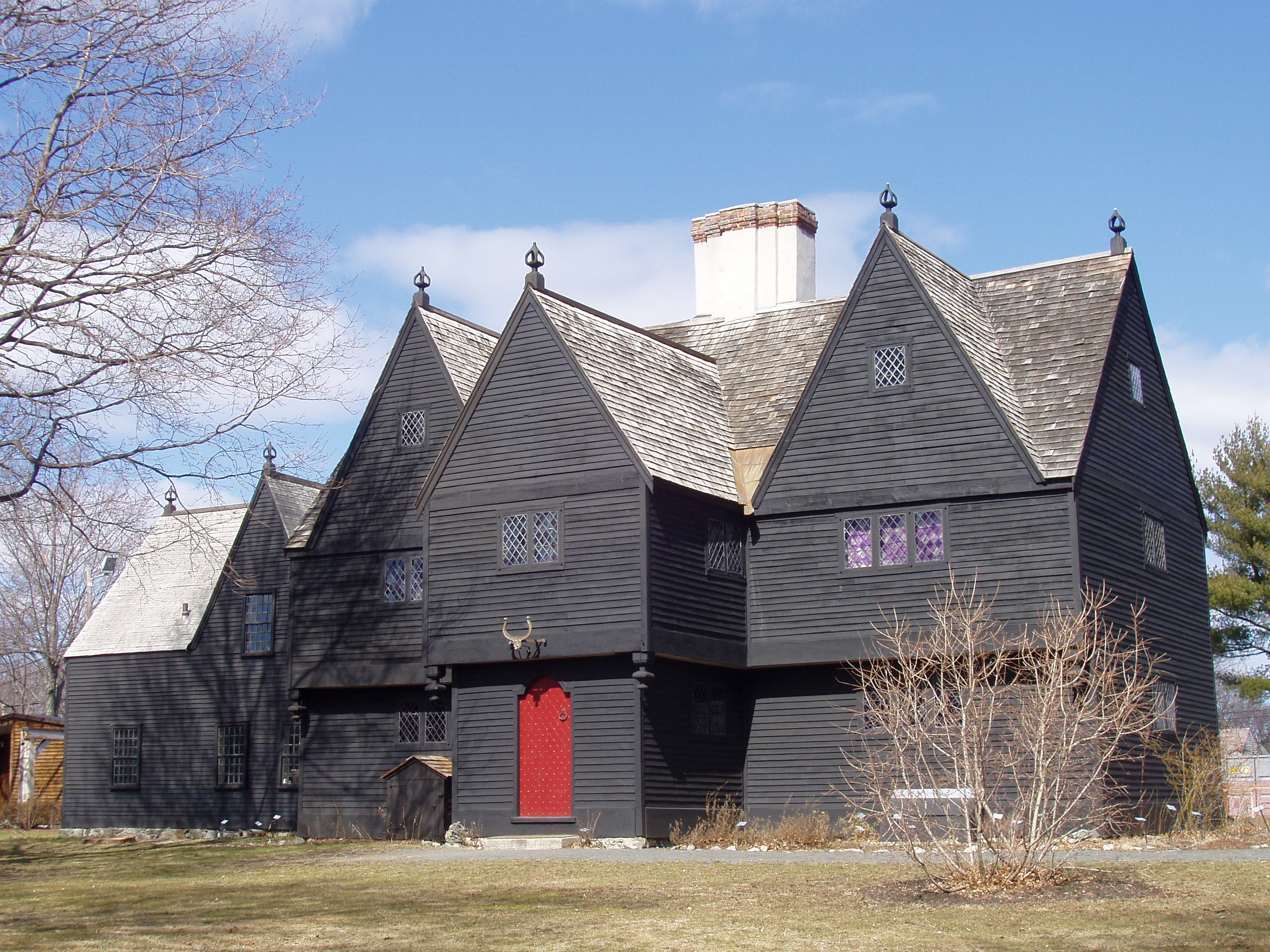
17th-century house restored by Wallace Nutting

In 1915, antiquarian Wallace Nutting purchased the Appleton-Taylor-Mansfield House, a 1680s farmhouse near the iron works site which was believed to be the former home of the ironmaster of the Saugus Iron Works. He renamed the home Broadhearth and undertook an extensive, albeit embellished, restoration of the home. Nutting used Broadhearth to showcase his collection of antiques, photographs, and reproduction furniture. In 1917 he added a blacksmith's shop to the property and hired a blacksmith to manufacture and sell reproductions of early ironwork. In 1920, Nutting, who was having financial troubles, sold the house to Boston antiques dealer Charles L. Cooney. After Cooney's death, his widow sold it to another Boston antiques dealer, Philip Rosenberg. Upon purchasing property, Rosenberg promised Louise Hawkes of the Parson Roby Chapter of the Daughters of the American Revolution that he would only sell the house to the DAR or the Town of Saugus. In 1938, the DAR purchased a piece of the former Iron Works property out of foreclosure for $50. In 1941, Rosenberg offered to sell the house to Saugus and the DAR, however neither could meet his asking price. Instead he reached an agreement with the Alumni Association of the Henry Ford Trade School, which intended on moving the building to Henry Ford's Greenfield Village in Dearborn, Michigan. News of the impending move caused outrage amongst Saugus residents and preservationists who, after extensive discussions, convinced Henry Ford not to acquire the building. In exchange, Ford wanted the Alumni Association reimbursed what it spent on the property. Fundraising efforts in Saugus were disappointing, so William Sumner Appleton, President of the Society for the Preservation of New England Antiquities, proposed splitting the cost between the state, town, and the public. When it became clear that this plan would not work, Appleton created a nonprofit, called the First Iron Works Association, to purchase and maintain the property. In 1943 the First Iron Works Association (FIWA) purchased the farmhouse as well as the DAR's piece of the former Iron Works property.

Louise E. du Pont Crowninshield, one of the FIWA's directors, approached Quincy Bent, a retired executive of Bethlehem Steel residing in Gloucester, Massachusetts, for money. Although Bent was unimpressed by the house, he was interested in the property's slag pile, which indicated that the site could contain the remains of an iron works. Bent eventually convinced the American Iron and Steel Institute (AISI) to fund the restoration of the Iron Works.

In September 1948, FIWA president J. Sanger Attwill approached archaeologist Roland W. Robbins who had discovered the site of Henry David Thoreau's cabin on Walden Pond about trying to find the site of the Iron Works. Robbins was interested in the idea of digging at a site that was over three hundred years old, the challenge of working on a site where there little information, including no plans or sketches, and the opportunity to work at what may have been the first iron-manufacturing plant in the American colonies. Robbins' excavations uncovered the major manufacturing units of the Iron Works, including the foundations of buildings, remains of the blast furnace, holding ponds, and canal, a 500-pound hammer used in the forge, and a waterwheel that powered the bellows for the blast furnace, along with its wheel pit. The wheel was saved by biologists from Harvard University, who developed a process to preserve it. In total, more than 5,000 artifacts were found. Robbins was aided by a historical researcher (Professor E. Neal Hartley of the Massachusetts Institute of Technology), metallurgic experts, specialists from Harvard University's biological laboratory and botanical museum, and a professional photographer. He also received assistance from collectors and experts, including Smithsonian curator C. Malcolm Watkins, MIT professor Herbert H. Uhlig, and Harvard professor Elso Barghoorn. Robbins abruptly left the Iron Works in 1953. Robbins departure came not long after a dispute with Bent, who wanted Robbins to give tours of the excavation site on weekends in addition to his other duties. According to archaeologist and author Donald W. Linebaugh, it was also due in part because of the decision of the FIWA to base the reconstruction of the Iron Works primarily on documentary evidence instead of archaeological evidence. Robbins also clashed with the project's architects, thinking them to be ignorant about and uninterested in archeological data.

The Boston architecture firm of Perry, Shaw & Hepburn, Kehoe & Dean, which was responsible for the restoration of Colonial Williamsburg, was hired to reconstruct the Iron Works. The reconstruction was based on archeological evidence and historical documents, as well as partially on conjecture. The Saugus Iron Works was opened on September 18, 1954, the first day of Saugus' three-day celebration of the town's 325th anniversary. Benjamin Franklin Fairless, chairman of U.S. Steel, served as master of ceremonies at the dedication. Also participating in the ceremony were Senator Leverett Saltonstall, Governor Christian Herter, First Iron Works Association President J. Sanger Attwill, and Inland Steel Company chairman Edward L. Ryerson.

== Becoming a National Park ==
After it opened to the public, Saugus Iron Works operated as a private museum run by the First Iron Works Association and funded by the American Iron and Steel Institute. In 1961, the AISI announced that it would no longer pay its annual maintenance subsidy, which left the future of the site uncertain. On April 5, 1968, the Saugus Iron Works was added to the National Park Service system and renamed the Saugus Iron Works National Historic Site. The park is open seasonally, spring through fall.

== Gallery ==
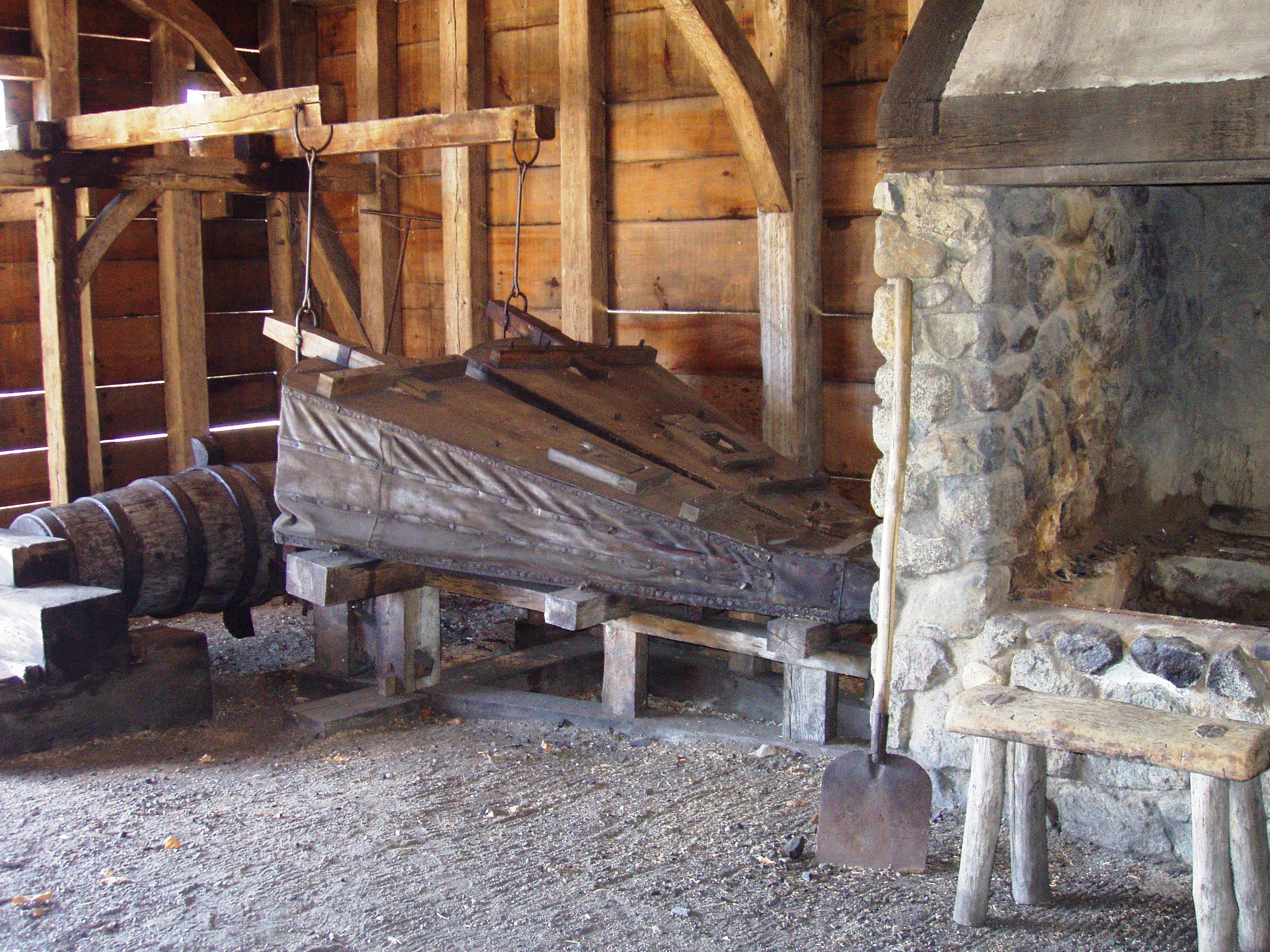
Reconstructed forge, interior view; note water-powered bellows

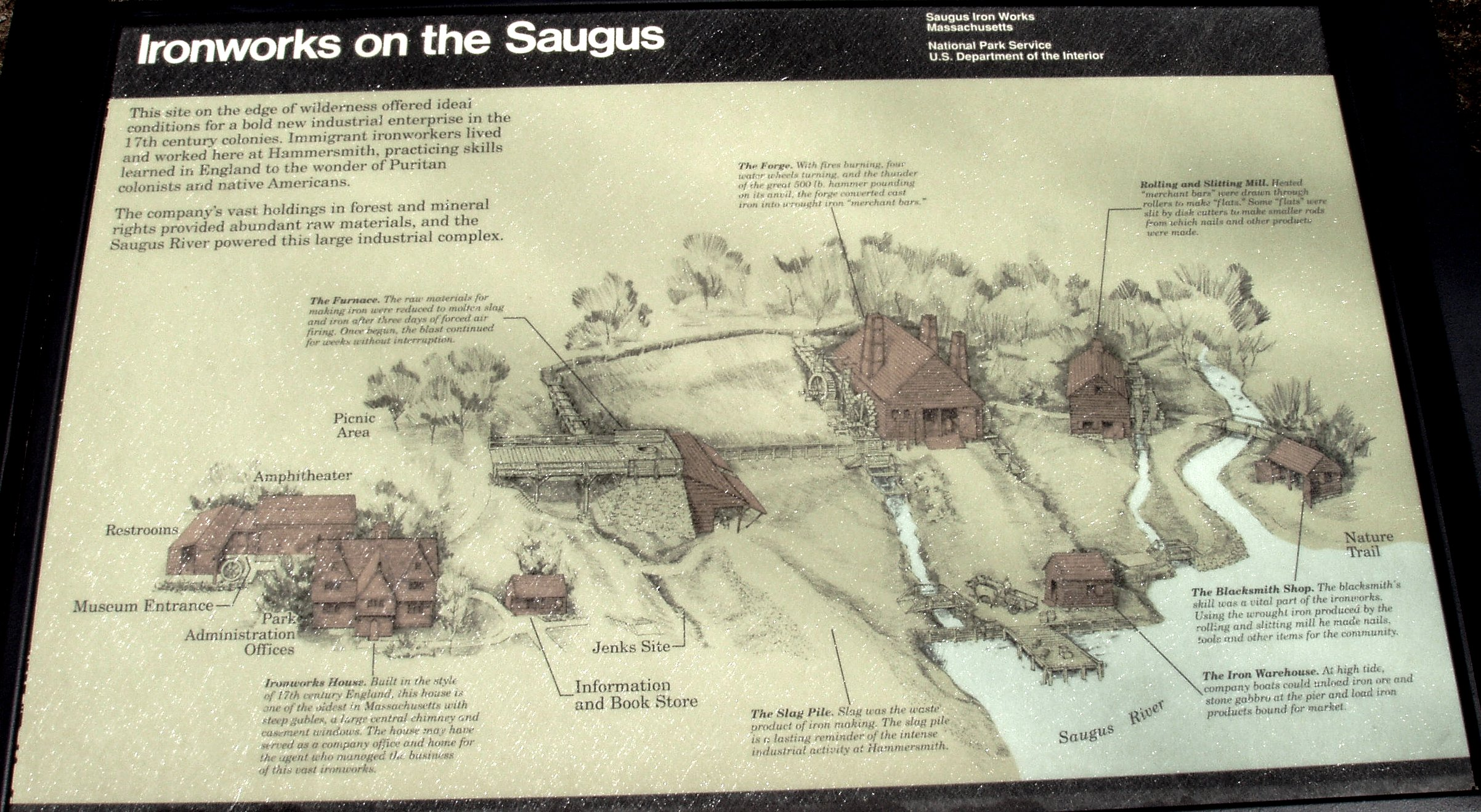
General site plan

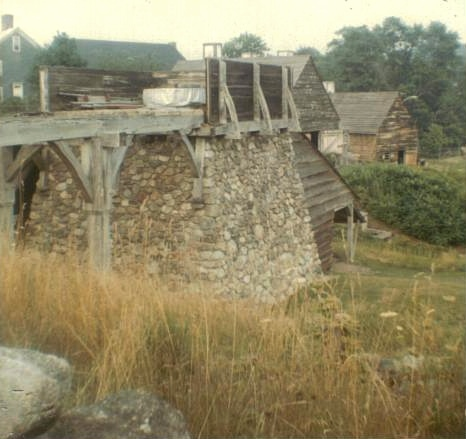
Saugus Iron Works (1971 photograph)

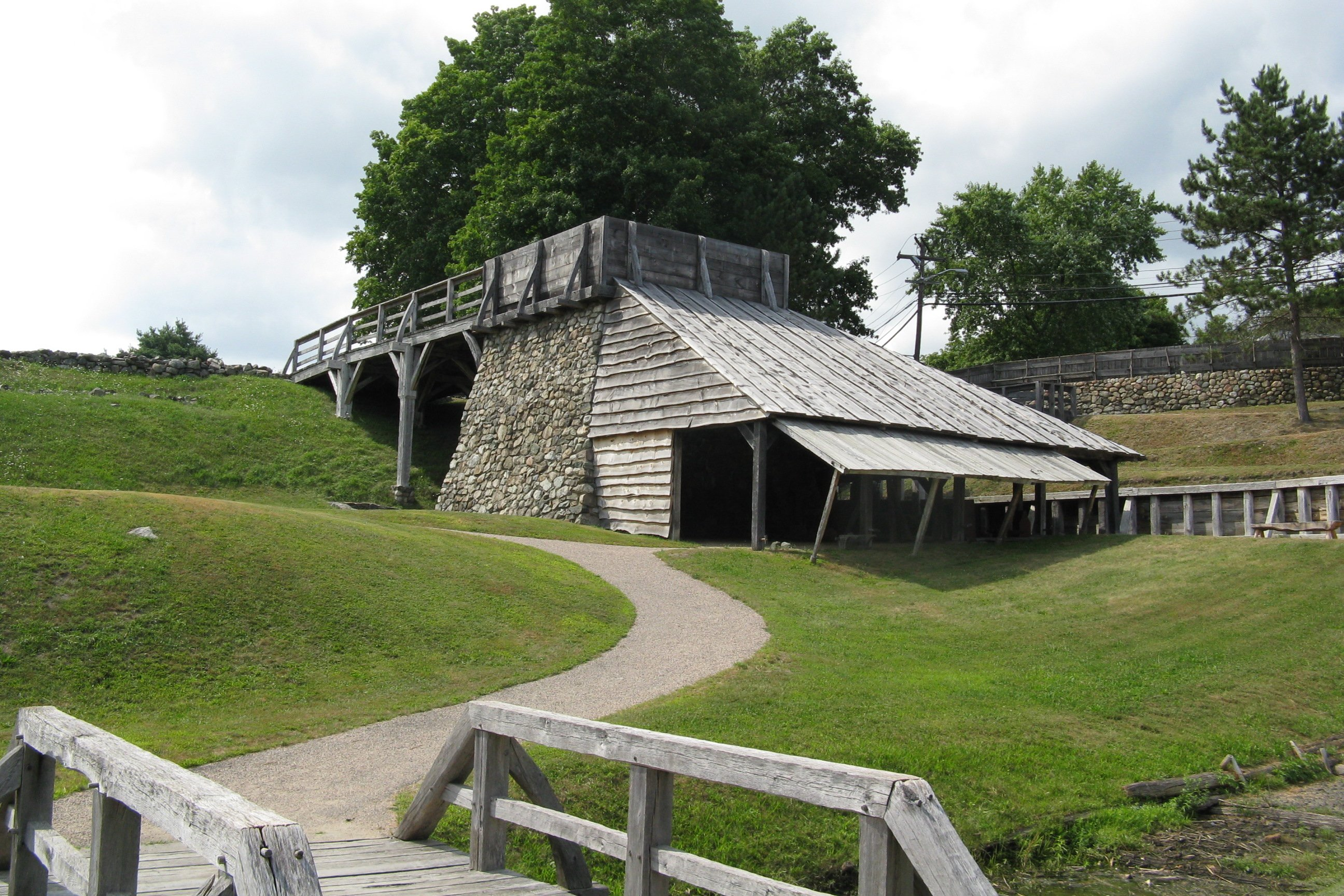
The furnace

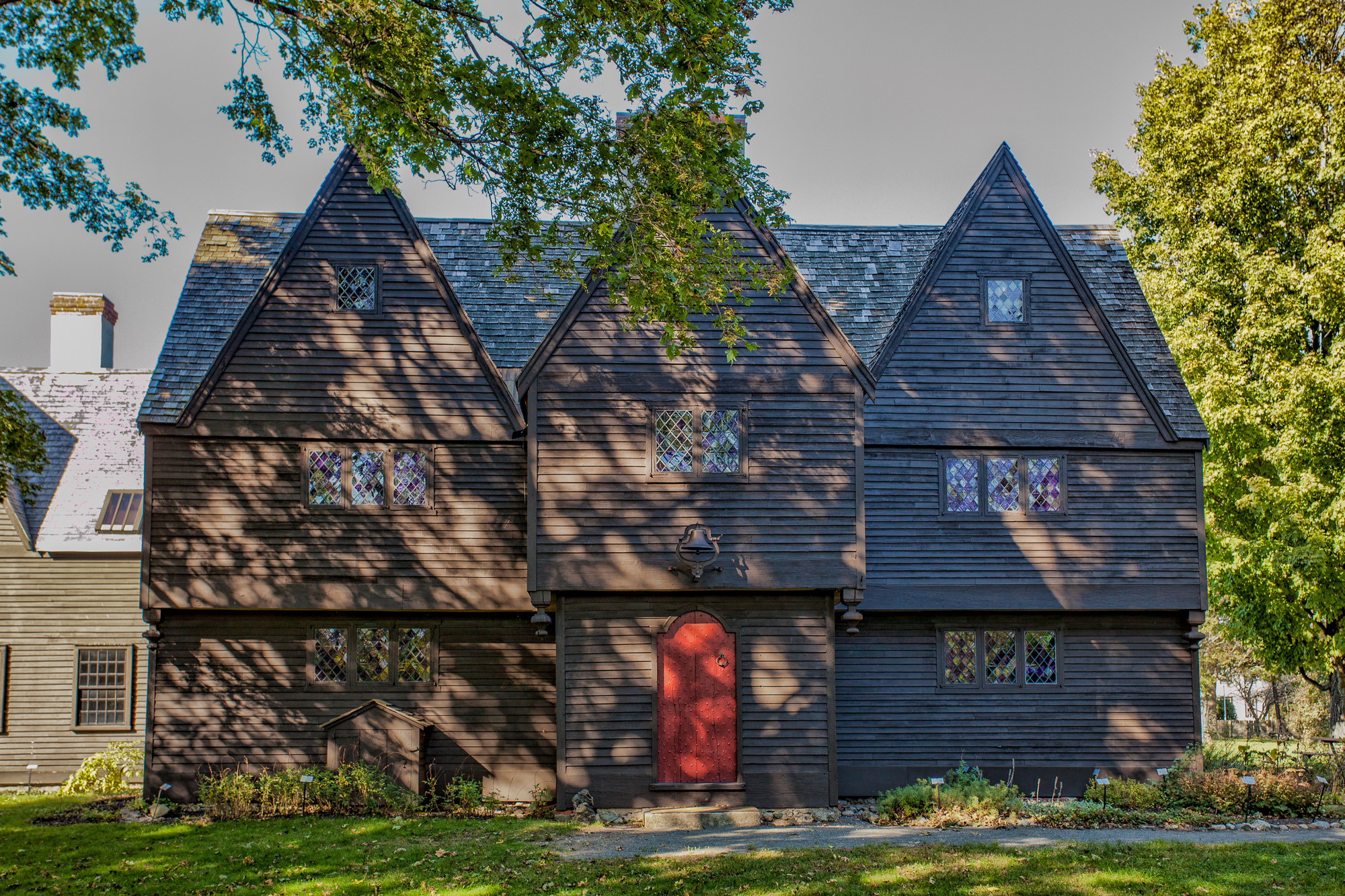
Saugus Iron Works house

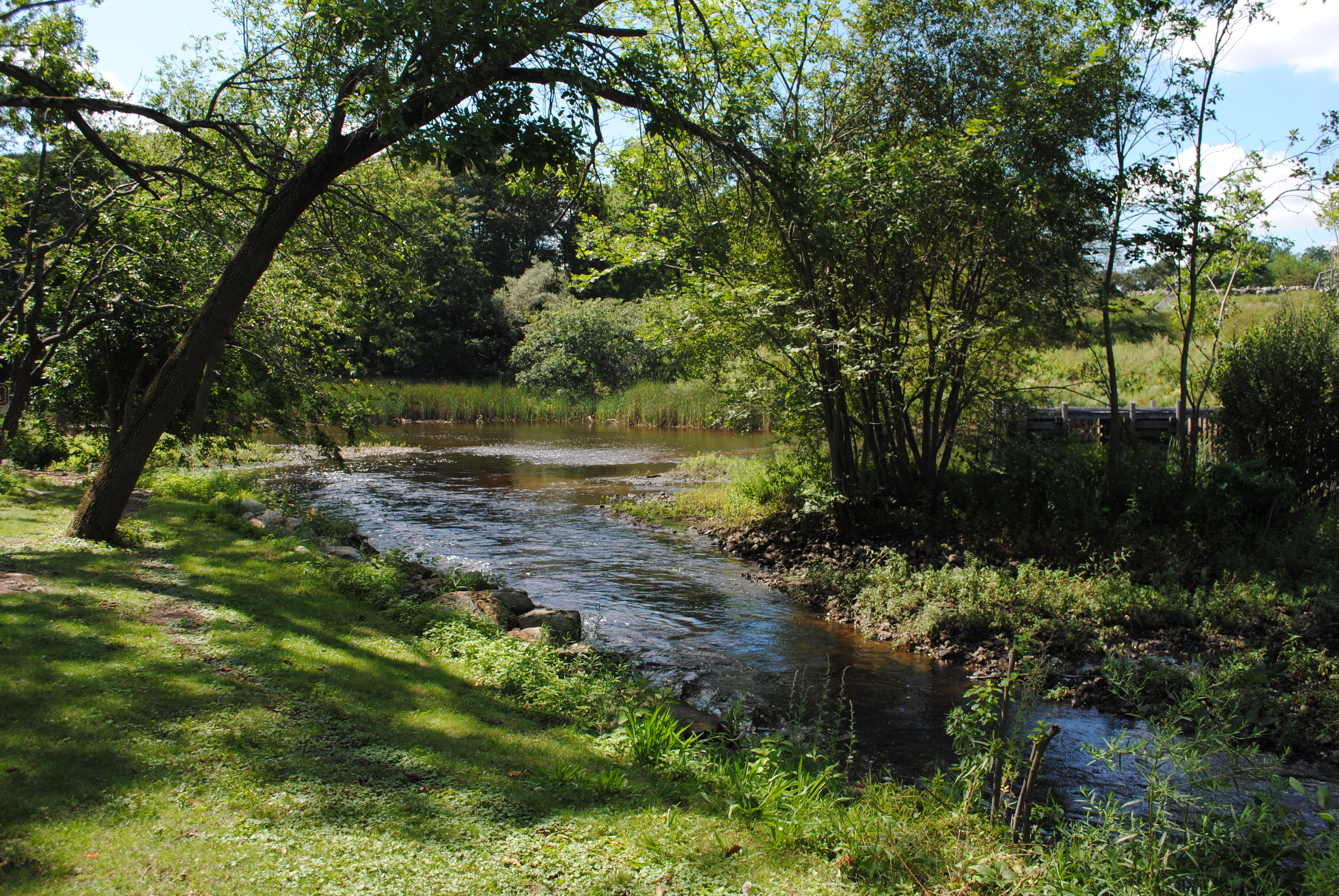
Saugus River at the Iron Works

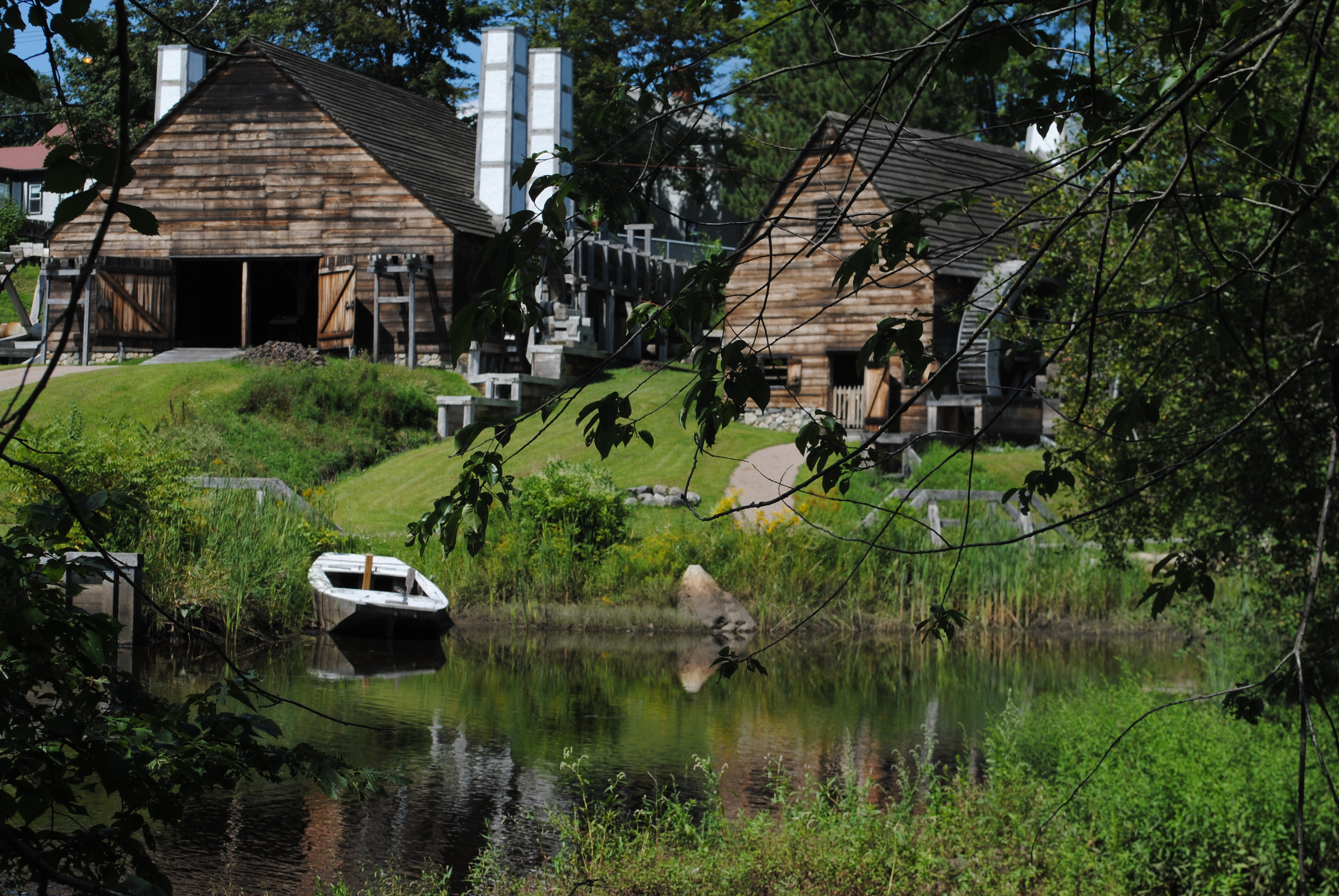
Forge, rolling and slitting mill, and Saugus River

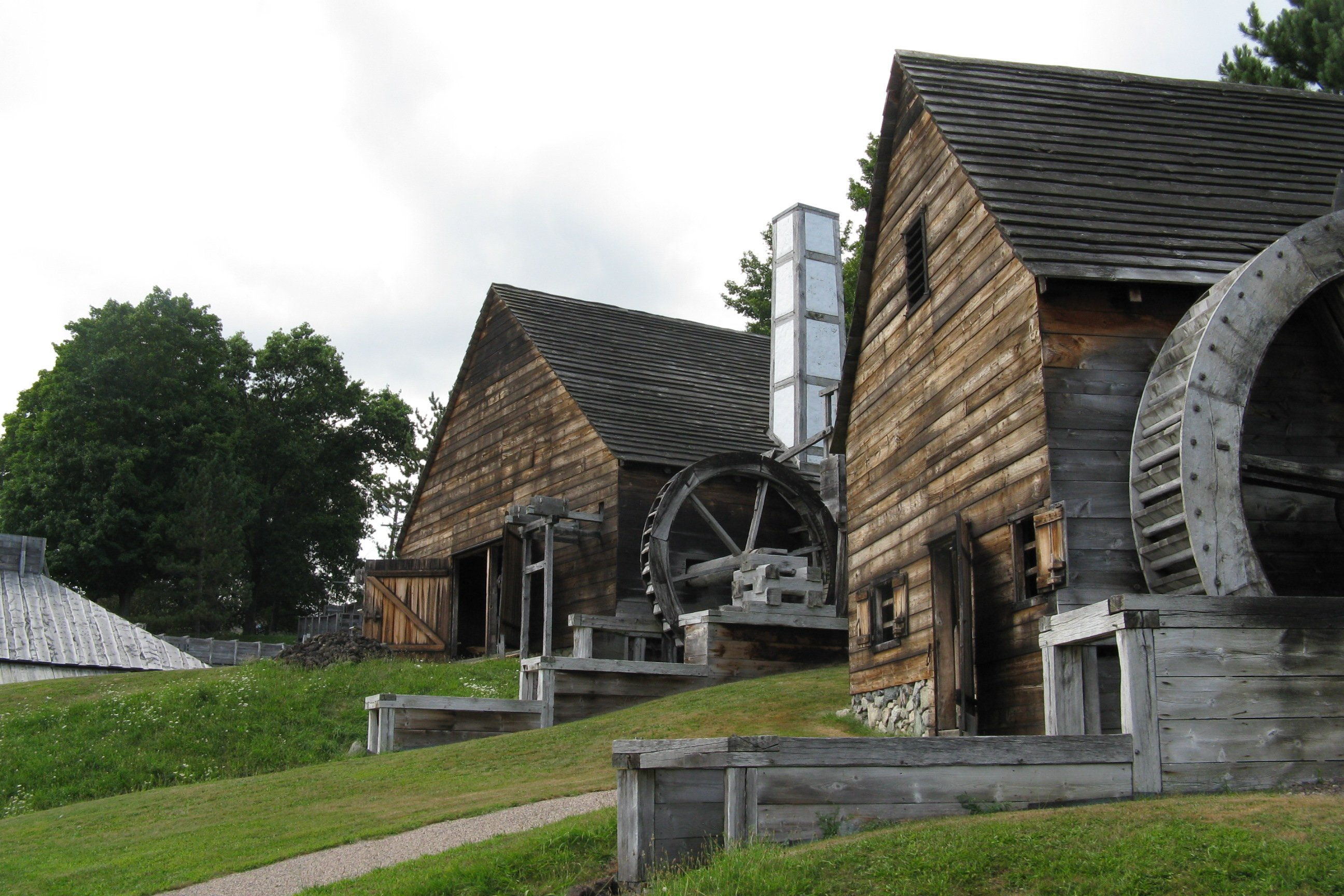
Forge and rolling and slitting mill

== See also ==
- Boardman House
- List of National Historic Landmarks in Massachusetts
- National Register of Historic Places listings in Essex County, Massachusetts
- Rowley Village Forge Site, Boxford
- Falling Creek Ironworks, first iron production works in North America
