= Benjamin Newberry =

Rhode Island colonial merchant and Speaker of the House of Deputies

3rd Speaker of the House of Deputies (now Representatives) in the Rhode Island General Assembly
- In office February 1699 – April 1700
- Preceded by: Joseph Jenckes Jr.
- Succeeded by: Jonathan Holmes

Deputy (now Representative) in the Rhode Island General Assembly
- In office 1699-1704
- Constituency: Newport

Personal details
- Born: November 3, 1652 (baptized) West Ilsley, Berkshire, England
- Died: November 10, 1711 (aged 59) Newport, Colony of Rhode Island and Providence Plantations
- Spouse(s): Leah (m. c. 1683)
- Parents: Humphrey Newberry (father); Sarah Newberry (mother)
- Occupation: merchant
- Known for: colonial diary

Benjamin Newberry (1652–1711) was an English-born American colonial merchant, diarist, and politician who served as the third Speaker of the Rhode Island House of Deputies. A member of Newport's Quaker community, he kept a diary documenting late 17th-century colonial life in Rhode Island.

== Personal life and diary ==
Benjamin Newberry was baptized on November 3, 1652, in West Ilsley, Berkshire, England, the son of Humphrey and Sarah Newberry. He later immigrated to Newport, Rhode Island.

Newberry was a member of the Religious Society of Friends (Quakers), as recorded in the Rhode Island Friends Records. At this time, half of Newport's population were Quakers, making it a center of Quaker activity in New England.

Newberry married Leah around 1683. Their children included Humphrey Newberry (1684–), Ann Newberry (1686–1728), Leah Newberry (1689–), Humphrey Newberry (1691–1700), Sankey Newberry (born after 1691), and Sarah Newberry (1696–1749).

Newberry kept a diary from 1689 to 1706, documenting colonial life in Newport. His entries record King William's War and French attacks on Block Island (1690, 1697), the smallpox epidemic of 1690 that killed approximately 100 people in Newport, the arrival of Presbyterian ministers to Newport in 1695, and the death of the Earl of Bellamont in 1701. His diary also records personal events, including the death of his son Humphrey on July 20, 1700: "dyed my son, Humphrey, the 8th son we have buryed, being nine years old, of leaver & flux, lying ill but 3 or 4 days." This suggests that he and Leah lost at least eight sons in infancy or childhood, many of whom are otherwise undocumented.

== Career ==
From Newport, Newberry operated an international trading business with activities in the Caribbean. Interestingly, in 1685 he purchased a copy of Robert Burton's Anatomy of Melancholy in Port Royal, Jamaica. The inscription in the book reads "Benjamin Newberry Ejus Liber Bought att Port Royall In Jamaica 1685," showing his presence in the major Caribbean trading center and familiarity with Latin.

Newberry represented Newport as a Deputy in the Rhode Island General Assembly from 1699 to 1704. He served as Speaker of the House of Deputies from February 1699 to April 1700, succeeding Joseph Jenckes Jr. and being succeeded by Jonathan Holmes.

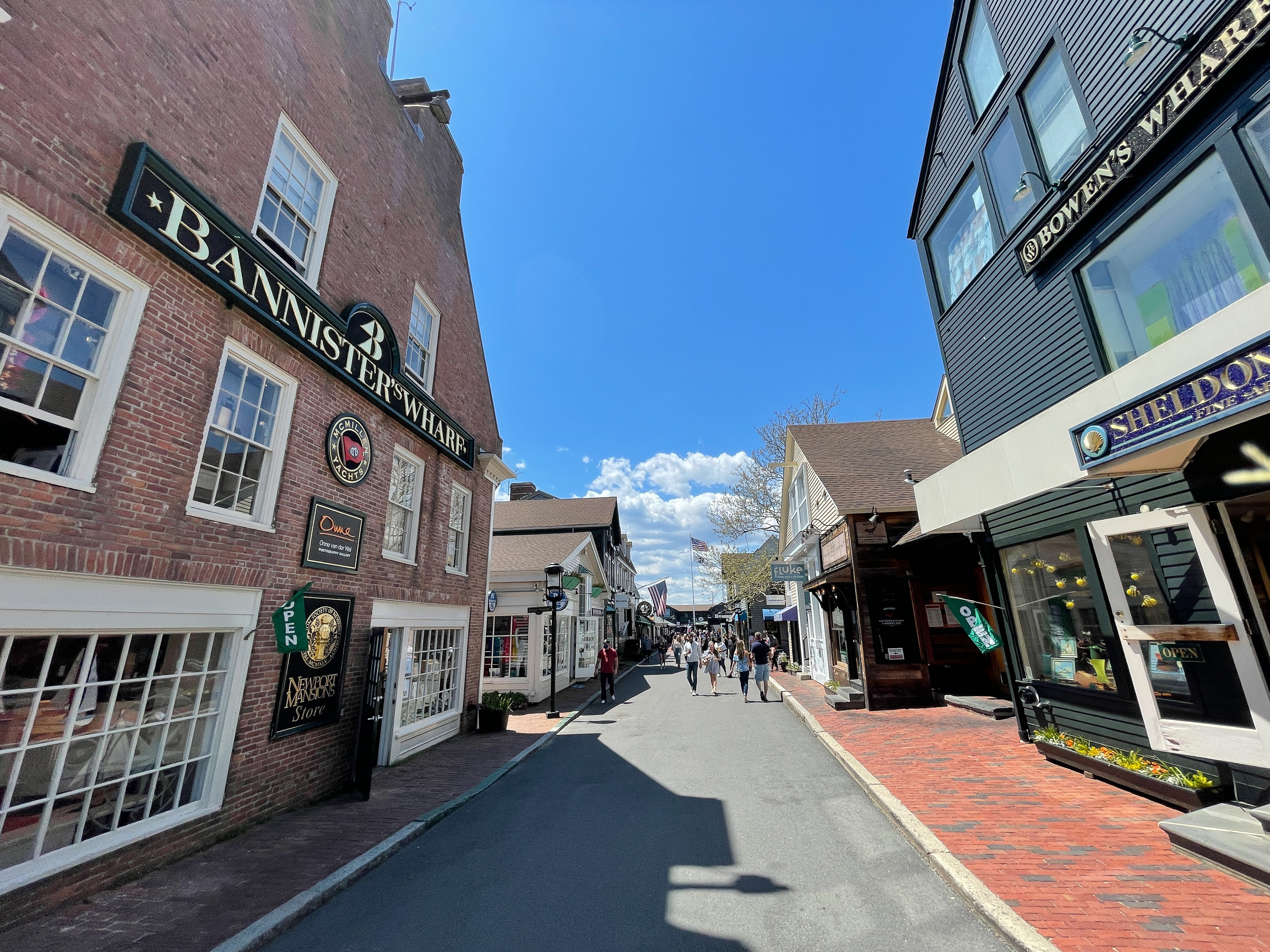
Bannister's Wharf

In 1704, Benjamin and Walter Newberry sold a valuable parcel of waterfront land in Newport to shipwright William Wanton, who later became governor of the colony. The deed describes a 40-by-200-foot lot "with dwellings, warehouses, shops, [and] wharves," bounded on the west by the harbor and on the east by the main street (now likely Thames Street). The northern boundary was a 20-foot lane running down to the sea, opposite the wharves. Historical descriptions place the property within the current commercial waterfront district of lower Thames Street, likely near Bannister's Wharf or Bowen's Wharf — both 18th-century centers of maritime trade.

== Death and legacy ==
Benjamin Newberry died on November 10, 1711, in Newport at age 59 and was buried in Clifton graveyard (later renamed Golden Hill Cemetery). His will, dated May 11, 1711, and proved December 13, 1711, mentioned his wife Leah, several children, and various cousins, including members of the Pope family.

Newberry's diary provides contemporary accounts of military conflicts, disease outbreaks, religious developments, and daily life in late 17th-century Newport. His international trading contributed to Newport's emergence as a major Atlantic commercial center.

== See also ==
- List of speakers of the Rhode Island House of Representatives

== Bibliography ==
- Arnold, James N. (1891). Vital Record of Rhode Island, 1636–1850: First series, births, marriages and deaths. A family register for the people. Vol. 7. Providence: Narragansett Historical Publishing Company.
- Black, Joseph (September 15, 2022). "Robert Burton, Anatomy of Melancholy (1651)". Early Modern Female Book Ownership.
- Buffum, Mrs. William P. (April 1922). "The Story of the Old Friends' Meeting House". Bulletin of the Newport Historical Society (40).
- FamilySearch. "International Genealogical Index v5.0 British Isles, Batch Number C019752, West Ilsley, Berkshire, England christenings". FamilySearch.
- "Abstracts from Rhode Island Colonial Land Evidence". The Newport Historical Magazine. Vol. 3, no. 1. July 1882. p. 31.
- "Abstracts of Newport Wills". Rhode Island Genealogical Register. 3: 22. 1893.
- Turner, Henry E. (October 1893). "Benjamin Newberry's Diary". Magazine of New England History. 3 (4): 203–206.
