= Quincy Bent =

American businessman (1879–1955)

Quincy Bent (July 28, 1879 – May 5, 1955) was an American businessman who served as vice president of Bethlehem Steel.

== Early life ==
Bent was born on July 28, 1879, in Steelton, Pennsylvania, to Luther Stedman Bent, superintendent of the Pennsylvania Steel Company's plant at Steelton, and Mary Stearns Felton Bent, daughter of Pennsylvania Steel president Samuel Morse Felton Sr. When Samuel M. Felton died in 1889, his son-in-law Luther S. Bent succeeded him as president and the family relocated to Philadelphia.

== Career ==
Bent graduated from Williams College in 1901, and began working at Pennsylvania Steel's Steelton plant. In 1909, he was named assistant to the president of the Maryland Steel Company, a subsidiary of Pennsylvania Steel. In 1916, Pennsylvania Steel was acquired by Bethlehem Steel and Bent became general manager of the Steelton plant. Bethlehem chairman Charles M. Schwab described Bent as "the biggest asset we bought in Pennsylvania Steel". In 1918 he was appointed vice president in charge of steel division operations, which placed him in charge of all the company's steel plants. During World War II, Bent was a member of the Steel Advisory Committee of the Army and Navy Munitions Board, and chaired two committees of the War Production Board. In 1944, Bent was awarded the American Iron and Steel Institute's Gary Medal "for outstanding leadership in the art of steel production and in contributions to the development of alloy steels to meet the needs of war emergency". Bent retired on November 1, 1947, but remained on as a director and vice president in an advisory and consulting capacity until December 31, 1947.

Bent was also a trustee of Williams College and a member of the American Iron and Steel Institute, the Iron and Steel Institute of Britain, and the American Society of Mining and Metallurgic Engineers.

== Personal life ==
On January 4, 1910, Bent married Deborah Norris Brock. They had one son - Horace Brock Bent. The family resided at Weyhill Farms near Bethlehem, Pennsylvania. In 1914, Bent built Quattro Venti, a 15-room Tuscan-style summer home in Annisquam, Massachusetts, furnished mostly with purchases made by Deborah Norris Bent during her visits to Italy.

== Saugus Iron Works ==
Louise E. du Pont Crowninshield, one of the directors of the First Iron Works Association, an organization dedicated to preserving the site of the first integrated ironworks in North America, approached Bent for a financial contribution. Bent visited the site and was intrigued by the property's slag pile, which indicated that it could contain the remains of an iron works. Bent eventually convinced the American Iron and Steel Institute to fund the restoration of the Iron Works. The restoration was completed in 1954 and the Saugus Iron Works opened as a private museum run by the First Iron Works Association and funded by the American Iron and Steel Institute. After the AISI stopped funding the museum it was added to the National Park Service system.

== Death ==
Bent died on May 5, 1955, at Weyhill Farms, following a long illness.
