= Samuel Newman =

Clergyman

Samuel Newman (May 10, 1602 – July 5, 1663) was a clergyman in colonial Massachusetts whose concordance of the Bible, published first in London in 1643, far surpassed any previous work of its kind.

Newman was born in Banbury, Oxfordshire, England, in 1602, son of Richard Newman. He graduated from Trinity College, Oxford in 1620, took orders in the Church of England. He was prosecuted for nonconformity and emigrated to Massachusetts Bay Colony, probably in 1636.

After preaching nearly two years at Dorchester, he became pastor of the church at Weymouth, where he remained until 1643. The following year he removed with part of his church to Seconet, in Plymouth Colony. There they founded the town of Rehoboth, which then embraced what is now Seekonk, Massachusetts and Rumford, Rhode Island. He died in Rehoboth on July 5, 1663.

Newman's famous Concordance was the third in English ever published and greatly superior to its two predecessors. The first edition was published in London in 1643, just before Newman's removal from Weymouth to Rehoboth. At Rehoboth, he revised and greatly improved it, using in the evening (according to Ezra Stiles, a President of Yale) pine knots instead of candles. The second edition was published at Cambridge in 1662 and the concordance was usually known after that as the Cambridge Concordance. The concordance was reprinted at least as late as 1889, almost 250 years after it was first published.

== List of editions and major printings ==
- First edition of Clement Cotton's Concordance to the last edition was printed in 1631 " A COMPLETE CONCORDANCE TO THE BIBLE OF THE LAST TRANSLATION. By helpe whereof any passage of Holy Scripture may bee readily turned unto. The whole reviewed, corrected, and much enlarged. the further use & benefit of this Work is more fully declared in the Prefaces to the Reader. Printed for T.Downes and R. Young, London: 1631".
- A large and compleat concordance to the Bible in English according to the last translation : first collected by Clement Cotton and now much enlarged and amended for the good both of schollars and others, far exceeding the most perfect that ever was extant in our language, both in ground-work and building. London : Printed for Thomas Downes and James Young, 1643.
- A large and compleat concordance to the Bible in English : according to the last translation (a like work formerly performed by Clement Cotton) / by Samuel Newman now teacher at Rehoboth in New-England. Third Printing ("And now this second impression corrected and amended in many things formerly omitted for the good both of scholars and others for exceeding the most perfect that ever was extant in our language, both in ground-work and building"). London : Printed for Thomas Downes and Andrew Crook, 1650.
- A LARGE AND COMPLEAT CONCORDANCE TO THE BIBLE IN ENGLISH, According to the last Translation (A like Work formerly performed by Clement Cotton) / by Samuel Newman now Teacher of the Church at Rehoboth in New-England. Fourth Printing ("And now this third impression corrected and amended in many things formerly omitted for the good both of Scholars and others : far exceeding the most perfect that ever was extant in our Language, both in ground-work and building"). London : Printed for Thomas Downes and Andrew Crook, 1658.
- A concordance to the Holy Scriptures : with the various readings both in text and margin : in a more exact method then [[Sic (Latin)| [sic]]] hath hitherto been extant. 2nd ed. Cambridge, 1662.
- A Concordance to the Holy Scriptures : with the Various Readings both of Text and Margin, in a More Exact Method then [[Sic (Latin)| [sic]]] hath Hitherto been Extant. 2nd ed. (subsequent printing). Cambridge, 1672.
- A concordance to the Holy Scriptures : with the various readings both of text and margin : in a more exact method than hath hitherto been extant. 3rd ed. Cambridge, 1682.
- A concordance to the Holy Scriptures : together with the books of the Apocrypha with the various readings both of text and margin : in a more exact method then [[Sic (Latin)| [sic]]] hath hitherto been extant. 4th ed. Cambridge, 1698.
- 5th ed. London, 1720.
- Reprint of 2nd ed. London: John F Shaw & Co, 1889.

== Sources ==
- Mather, Cotton. Magnalia Christi Americana: or, the ecclesiastical history of New-England, from its first planting in the year 1620, unto the year of our Lord, 1698. London : printed for Thomas Parkhurst, 1702.
- Savage, James. A genealogical dictionary of the first settlers of New England, showing three generations of those who came before May, 1692, on the basis of Farmer’s Register. Boston: Little, Brown and company, 1860-62.
