= American Iron and Steel Institute =

US trade association

Logo

The "Steelmark" logo, originated by U.S. Steel and used by AISI to promote the steel industry. The logo of the Pittsburgh Steelers and Chilean association football club Huachipato is based on the Steelmark.

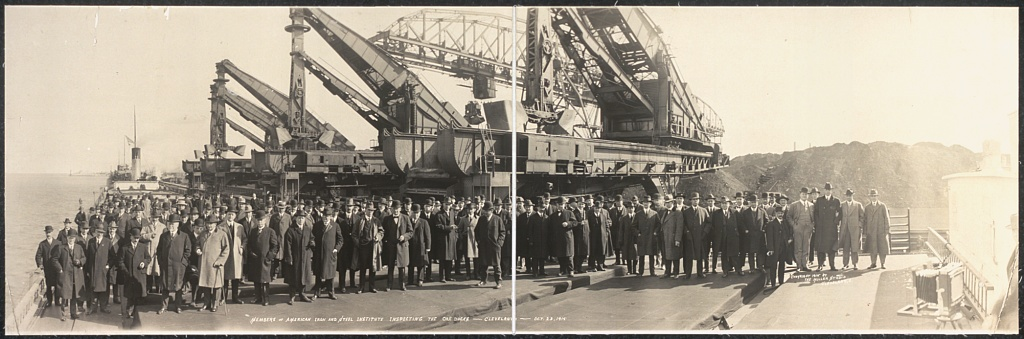
Members of American Iron and Steel Institute in 1915 at the ore docks in Cleveland

The American Iron and Steel Institute (AISI) is a trade association of North American steel producers. Including its predecessor organizations, it is one of the oldest trade associations in the United States, dating back to 1855. It assumed its present form in 1908, with Judge Elbert H. Gary, chairman of the United States Steel Corporation, as its first president. Its development was in response to the need for a cooperative agency in the iron and steel industry for collecting and disseminating statistics and information, carrying on investigations, providing a forum for the discussion of problems and generally advancing the interests of the industry.

== Stainless steel numbering system ==
The AISI maintained a numbering system for wrought stainless steel in which the three digits indicate the various compositions. The 200 and 300 series are generally austenitic stainless steels, whereas the 400 series are either ferritic or martensitic. Some of the grades have a one-letter or two-letter suffix that indicates a particular modification of the composition. In 1995 the AISI turned over future maintenance of the system to the Society of Automotive Engineers.

== Elbert H. Gary Medal ==
Since 1927, the institute has awarded the Elbert H. Gary Medal, an annual medal named for its first president, to a leader within the North American steel industry. Recipients include:

- 1944: Quincy Bent
- 1991: Frank W. Luerssen
- 1997: Joseph F. Toot Jr.
- 2003: John T. Mayberry
- 2004: Daniel R. DiMicco
- 2005: David Sutherland
- 2006: John P. Surma

== See also ==
- World Steel Association
- List of steel producers
- Metal Building Manufacturers Association
- SAE steel grades
- Pittsburgh Steelers
