= Saugus River =

River in Massachusetts, United States

Coordinates: 42°26′38″N 70°58′02″W

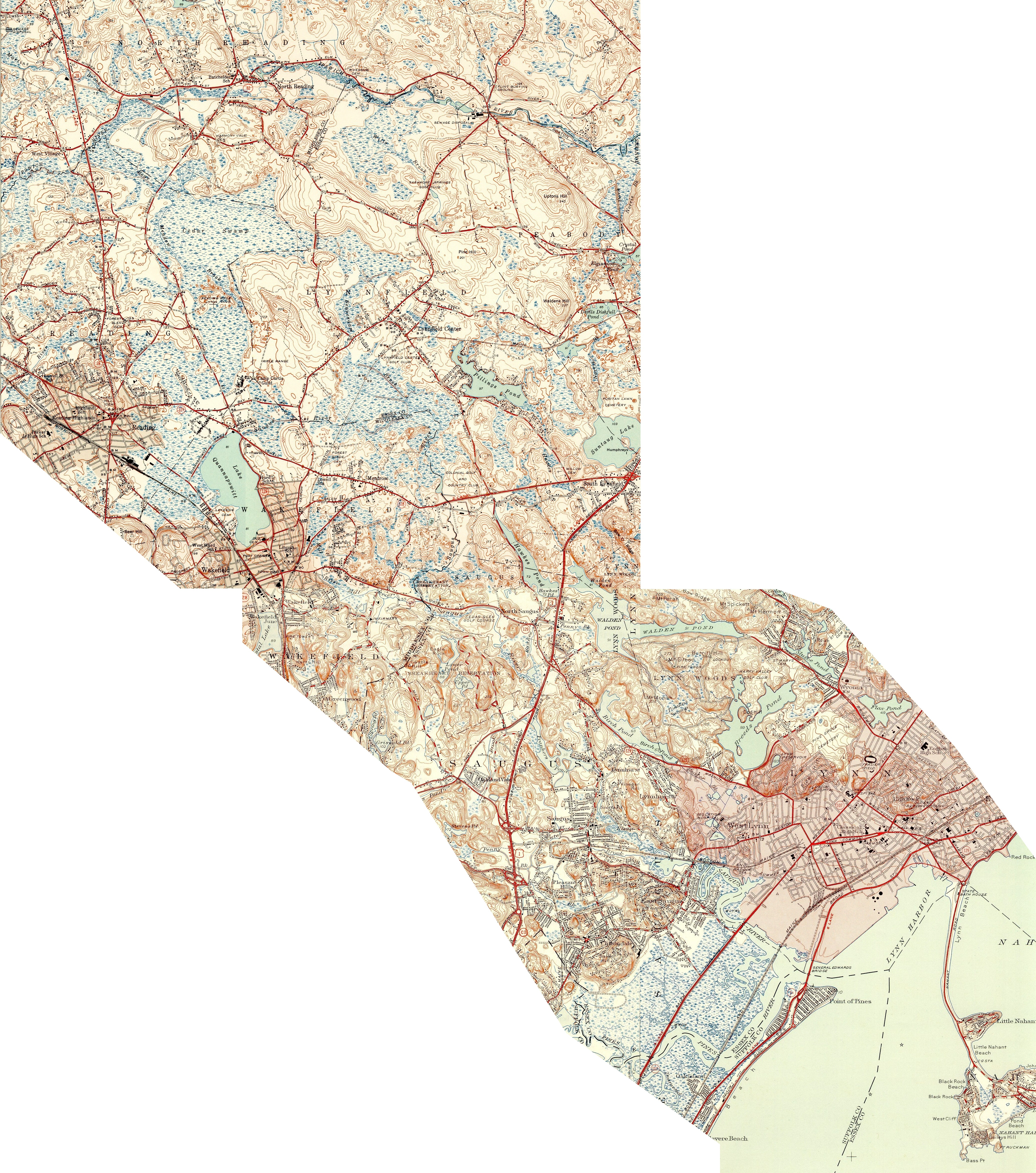
Saugus River and environs

The Saugus River is a river in Massachusetts.

The river is 13 miles (21 km) long, drains a watershed of approximately 47 square miles (120 km^{2}), and passes through Wakefield, Lynnfield, Saugus, and Lynn as it meanders east and south from its source in Lake Quannapowitt in Wakefield (elevation 90 feet (27 m)) to its mouth in Broad Sound. It has at least eight tributaries: the Mill River; Bennets Pond Brook; the Pines River; Hawkes Brook; Crystal Pond Brook; Beaver Dam Brook; Strawberry Brook; and Shute Brook.

Although Native Americans called the river Aboutsett ("winding stream"), European settlers first called it the River at Saugus, where Saugus (possibly a native word for "long") arguably named the beach running from Swampscott to Revere (there are competing theories as to the origin of the word "Saugus"). In early European times, alewives and bass were harvested from 1632 onwards. The Saugus Iron Works used water power from the river in by 1642, and the river subsequently attracted grist mills, chocolate mills, wool and flannel mills, and a tannery.
