= Herbert Wendell Gleason =

American photographer (1855–1937)

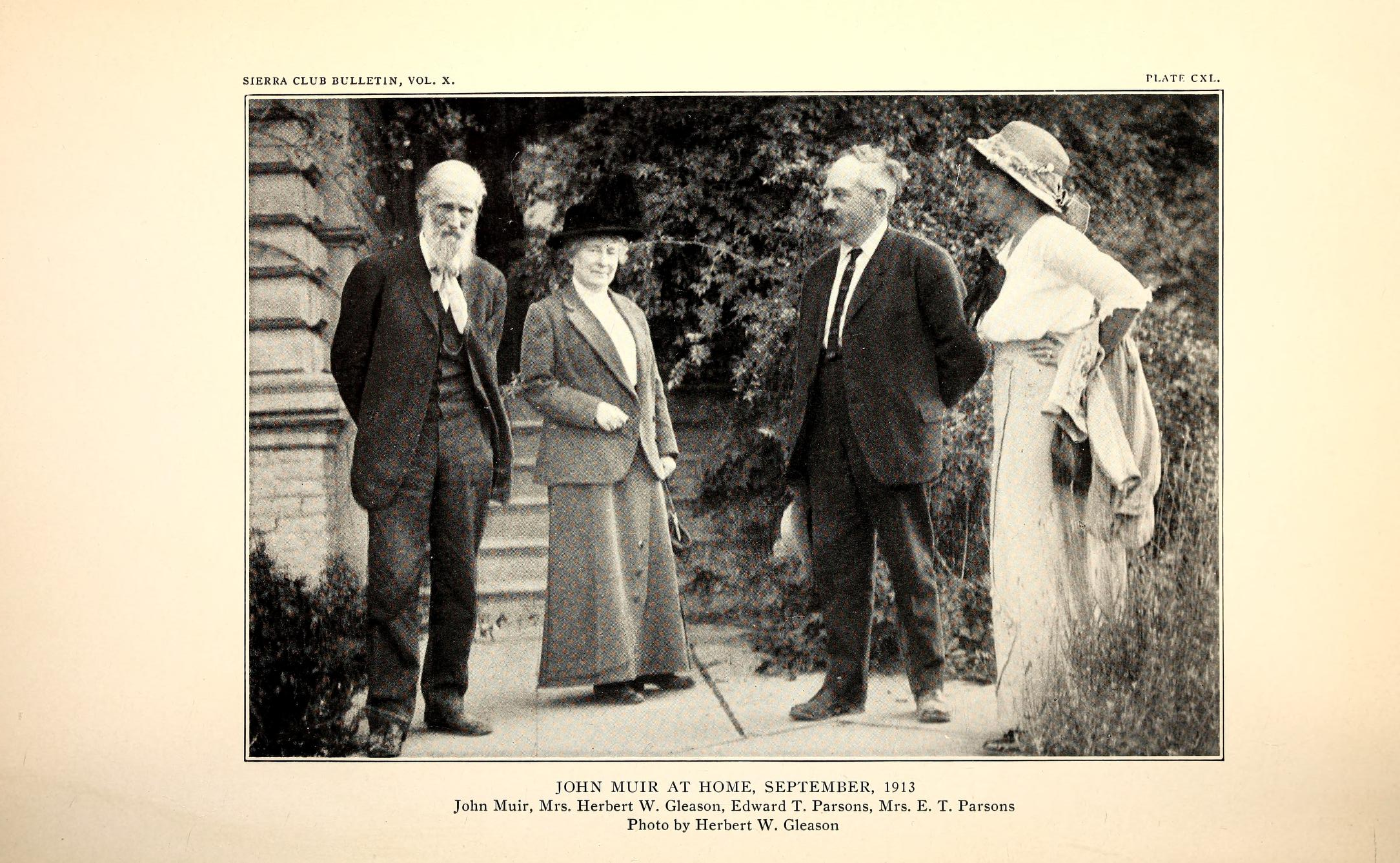
Gleason's photo of John Muir, Gleason's wife, Edward T. Parsons, and Parsons' wife

Herbert Wendell Gleason (June 5, 1855 –1937) was a photographer in the United States. His works can be found in private, and institutional collections. The Concord Free Public Library has 700 of his negatives. The Whitney Museum of American Art has nine of his photographs. The Getty Museum has six of his photographs.

He was born in Malden, Massachusetts. He was in Williams College class of 1877. He graduated from Andover Theological Seminary with a Bachelor of Divinity degree in 1882. He married Lulie Wadsworth Rounds in 1883.

He became a Congregational minister before transitioning to become a photographer. He did landscape photography of National Parks traveling with John Muir and Stephen Mather. From 1899 to 1934 he photographed the American West, missions in California, Luther Burbank's horticultural experiments, mansions and formal gardens on the east coast, Boston's Arnold Arboretum, flowers in the wild and in gardens, the Canadian Rockies, and National Parks including Yosemite National Park. He also photographed Alaska, Minnesota, Native Americans, commercial, and industrial subjects.

He gave slide show presentations. His wife was a colorist for his slides.

== Gallery ==
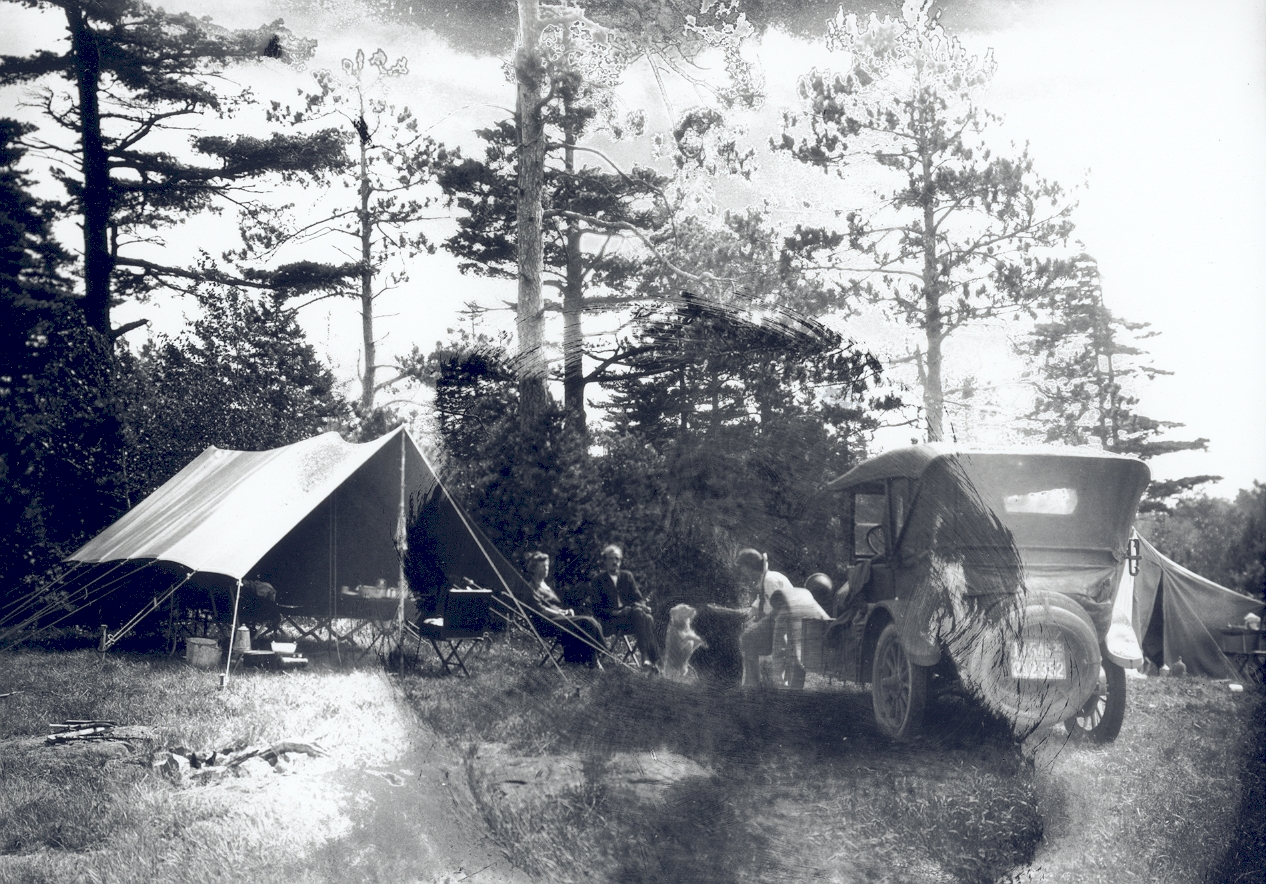
Auto Parties in Camp (1922)

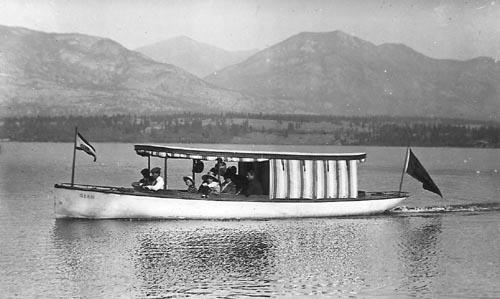
On Lake Windermere in British Columbia (1906)

Memorial Exercises after the death of U.S. President Warren G. Harding held August 10, 1923 on a field at Acadia National Park

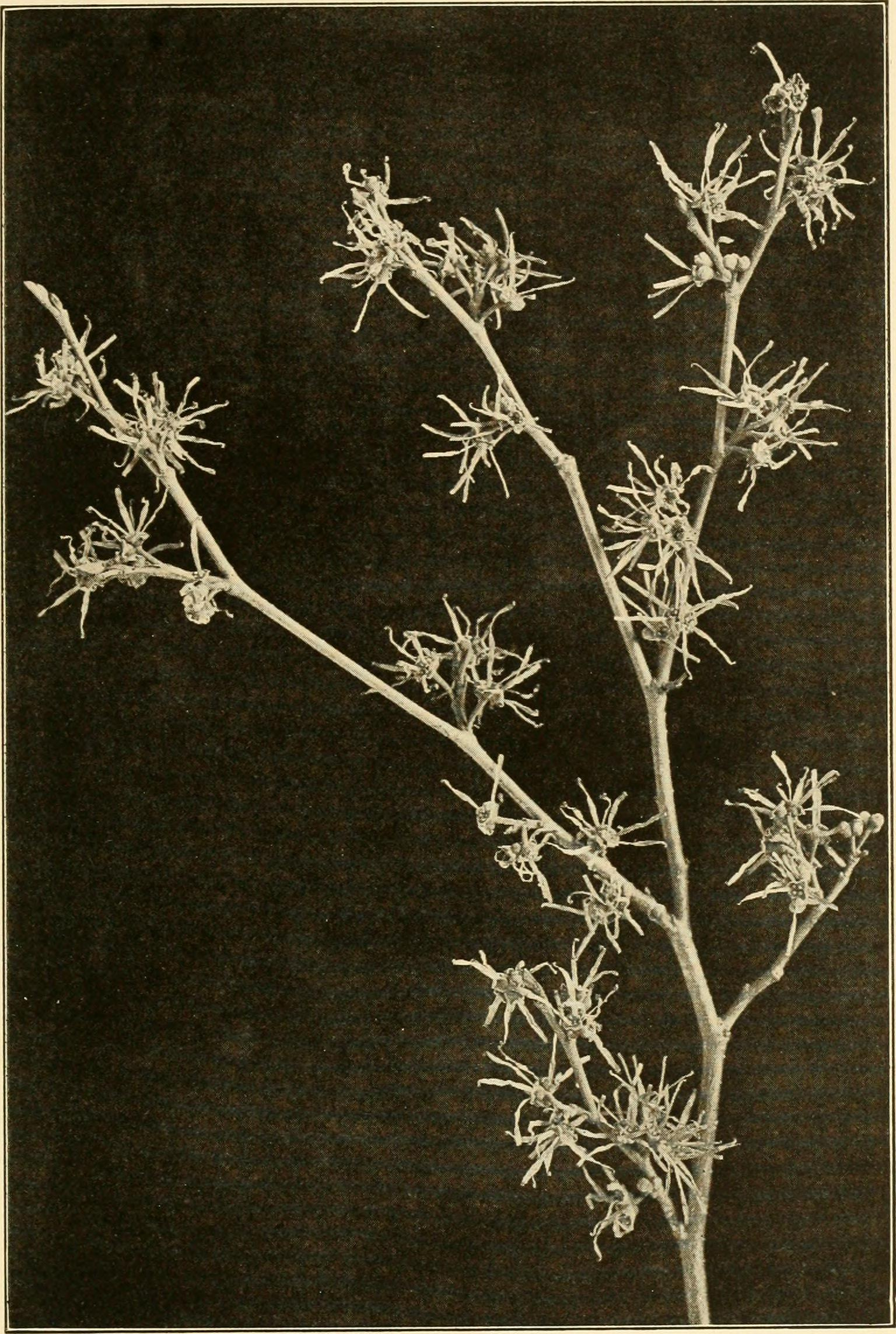
Photograph from Through the Year with Thoreau

== Publishings ==
- His photographs were published in The Manuscript Edition of The Writings of Henry David Thoreau (1906)
- His photographs illustrate Houghton Mifflin’s Through the Year with Thoreau (1917)
- Thoreau Country Sierra Club Books (January 1, 1975)
- Thoreau, Henry David; Gleason, Herbert Wendell (2016). Shanley, James Lyndon (ed.). The illustrated Walden: with photographs from the Gleason collection. Princeton Legacy Library. Princeton, New Jersey: Princeton University Press. ISBN 978-0-691-64523-0.
