= 1790 Rhode Island gubernatorial election =

- April 7, 1790
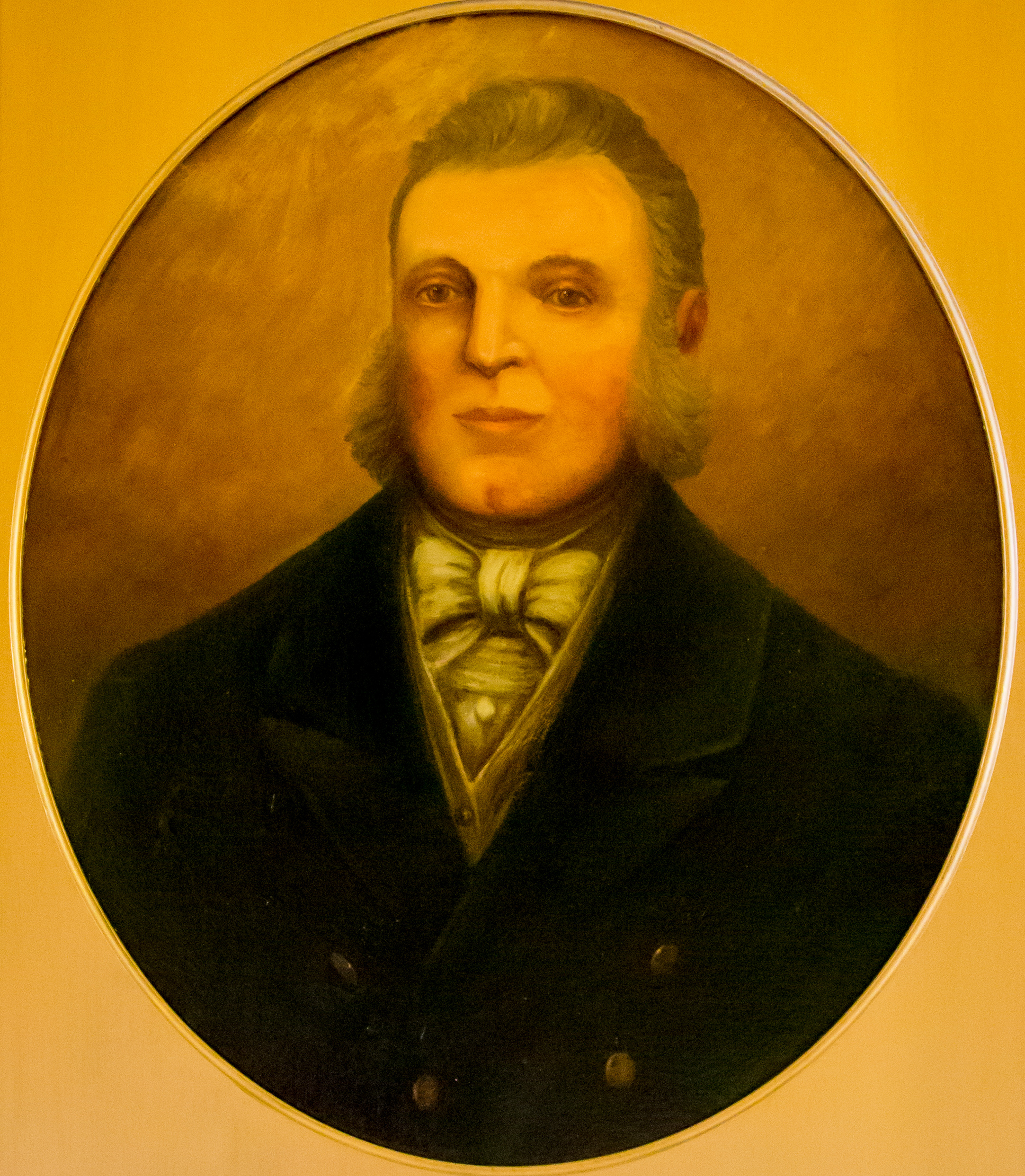

Nominee	Arthur Fenner	John Collins
Party	Anti-Federalist	Independent
Percentage	Unknown	Unknown
- County results Fenner: 90–100%
Governor before election
John Collins
Independent
Elected Governor
Arthur Fenner
Anti-Federalist

The 1790 Rhode Island gubernatorial election was held on April 7, 1790, in order to elect the governor of Rhode Island. Anti-Federalist candidate Arthur Fenner defeated incumbent Independent governor John Collins. The exact number of votes cast in this election are unknown.

== General election ==
On election day, April 7, 1790, Anti-Federalist candidate Arthur Fenner won the election against his opponent incumbent Independent governor John Collins, thereby gaining Anti-Federalist control over the office of governor. Fenner was sworn in as the 4th governor of Rhode Island on May 5, 1790.

=== Results ===
Rhode Island gubernatorial election, 1790
Party	Candidate	Votes	%
Anti-Federalist	Arthur Fenner		100.00
Independent	John Collins (incumbent)		
Total votes			
Anti-Federalist gain from Independent			
