= List of lieutenant governors of Rhode Island =

Seal of the lieutenant governor

The current lieutenant governor of Rhode Island is Sabina Matos, who was sworn in on April 14, 2021, after Daniel McKee succeeded to the office of governor. The first lieutenant governor was George Brown.

In Rhode Island, the lieutenant governor and governor of Rhode Island are elected on separate tickets.

Seven lieutenant governors have served during a vacancy in the office of governor under the current 1842 constitution: Francis M. Dimond (1853), William C. Cozzens (1863), Charles D. Kimball (1901), Norman Case (1928), John Pastore (1945), and John S. McKiernan (1950).

== Deputy governors of the Colony of Rhode Island ==
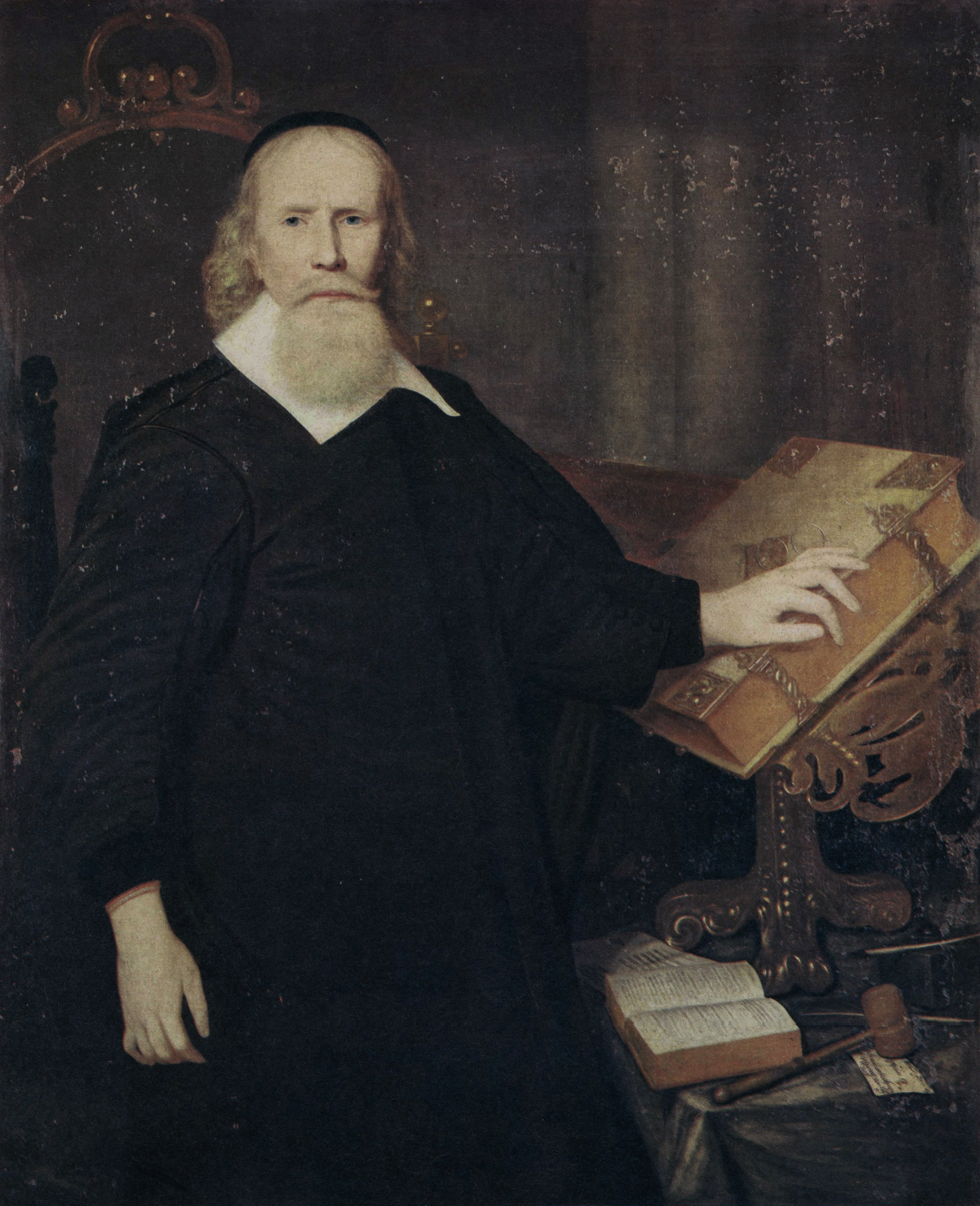
John Clarke, Deputy Governor 1669–70, 1671–72

- William Brenton, of Newport; November 1663 – 2 May 1666
- Nicholas Easton, of Newport; 2 May 1666 – 5 May 1669
- John Clarke, of Newport; 5 May 1669 – 4 May 1670
- Nicholas Easton, of Newport; 4 May 1670 – 3 May 1671
- John Clarke, of Newport; 3 May 1671 – 1 May 1672
- John Cranston, of Newport; 1 May 1672 – 7 May 1673
- William Coddington, of Newport; 7 May 1673 – 6 May 1674
- John Easton, of Newport; 6 May 1674 – April 1676
- John Cranston, of Newport; 3 May 1676 – 8 November 1678 (became governor)
- James Barker, of Newport; 8 November 1678 – 7 May 1679
- Walter Clarke, of Newport; 7 May 1679 – 5 May 1686
- John Coggeshall, Jr., of Newport; 5 May 1686 – June 1686

The Royal Charter was suspended from 1686 until 1689.

- John Coggeshall, Jr., of Newport; 18 April 1689 – 7 May 1690
- John Greene, Jr., of Warwick; 7 May 1690 – May 1, 1700
- Walter Clarke, of Newport; May 1, 1700 – May 23, 1714 (died in office)
- Henry Tew, of Newport; June 15, 1714 – May 3, 1715
- Joseph Jenckes, of Providence; May 3, 1715 – May 3, 1721
- John Wanton, of Newport; May 3, 1721 – May 2, 1722
- Joseph Jenckes, of Providence; May 2, 1722 – May 3, 1727
- Jonathan Nichols, of Newport; May 3, 1727 – August 2, 1727 (died in office)
- Thomas Frye, of East Greenwich; August 22, 1727 – May 7, 1729
- John Wanton, of Newport; May 7, 1729 – May 5, 1734
- George Hazard, of S. Kingstown; May 5, 1734 – before May 22, 1738 (died in office)
- Daniel Abbott, of Providence; July 5, 1738 – May 1, 1740
- Richard Ward, of Newport; May 1, 1740 – July 15, 1740 (became governor)
- William Greene, of Newport; July 15, 1740 – May 4, 1743
- Joseph Whipple, Jr., of Newport; May 4, 1743 – May 1, 1745
- William Robinson, of S. Kingstown; May 1, 1745 – May 7, 1746
- Joseph Whipple, Jr., of Newport; May 7, 1746 – May 6, 1747
- William Robinson, of S. Kingstown; May 6, 1747 – May 4, 1748
- William Ellery, Sr., of Newport; May 4, 1748 – May 2, 1750
- Robert Hazard, of S. Kingstown; May 2, 1750 – May 1, 1751
- Joseph Whipple, III, of Newport; May 1, 1751 – November 2, 1753 (resigned)
- Jonathan Nichols, Jr., of Newport; November 2, 1753 – May 1, 1754
- John Gardner, of Newport; May 1, 1754 – May 7, 1755
- Jonathan Nichols, Jr., of Newport; May 7, 1755 – September 1756 (died in office)
- John Gardner, of Newport; September 6, 1756 – January 1764 (died in office)
- Joseph Wanton, Jr., of Newport; February 27, 1764 – May 1, 1765
- Elisha Brown, of N. Providence; May 1, 1765 – May 6, 1767
- Joseph Wanton, Jr., of Newport; May 6, 1767 – May 4, 1768
- Nicholas Cooke, of Providence; May 4, 1768 – May 3, 1769
- Darius Sessions, of Providence; May 3, 1769 – May 3, 1775
- Nicholas Cooke, of Providence; May 3, 1775 – November 7, 1775 (became governor)
- William Bradford, of Bristol; November 7, 1775 – May 6, 1778

== Deputy and lieutenant governors of the State of Rhode Island ==
| Image | Name | Party | Term start | Term end | Residence |
|---|---|---|---|---|---|
| | William Bradford | | Nov. 1775 | May 1778 | Bristol |
| | Jabez Bowen | | May 1778 | May 1780 | Providence |
| | William West | | May 1780 | May 1781 | Scituate |
| | Jabez Bowen | | May 1781 | May 1786 | Providence |
| | Daniel Owen | | May 1786 | May 1790 | Glocester |
| | Samuel J. Potter | | May 1790 | Feb. 1799 | S. Kingstown |

The title of the office was changed to Lieutenant Governor in 1798.

| Image | Name | Party | Term start | Term end | Residence | Governor(s) served under |
|---|---|---|---|---|---|---|
| | George Brown | | 1799 | 1800 | S. Kingstown | Arthur Fenner |
| | Samuel J. Potter | | 1800 | 1803 | S. Kingstown | Arthur Fenner |
| | Paul Mumford | | 1803 | 1805 | Newport | Arthur Fenner |
| | Isaac Wilbour | | 1806 | 1807 | Little Compton | Isaac Wilbour |
| | Constant Taber | | 1807 | 1808 | Newport | James Fenner |
| | Simeon Martin | Federalist | 1808 | 1810 | Newport | James Fenner |
| | Isaac Wilbour | Democratic-Republican | 1810 | 1811 | Little Compton | James Fenner |
| | Simeon Martin | Federalist | 1811 | 1816 | Newport | William Jones |
| | Jeremiah Thurston | Federalist | 1816 | 1817 | Hopkinton | William Jones |
| | Edward Wilcox | Democratic-Republican | 1817 | 1821 | Charlestown | Nehemiah R. Knight |
| | Caleb Earle | Democratic-Republican | 1821 | 1824 | Providence | William C. Gibbs |
| | Charles Collins | | 1824 | 1833 | Newport | James Fenner; Lemuel H. Arnold |
| | Jeffrey Hazard | Democratic | 1833 | 1835 | Exeter | John B. Francis |
| | George Engs | Whig | 1835 | 1836 | Newport | John B. Francis |
| | Jeffrey Hazard | Democratic | 1836 | 1837 | Exeter | John B. Francis |
| | Benjamin Babock Thurston | Democratic | 1837 | 1838 | Hopkinton | John B. Francis |
| | Joseph Childs | Whig | 1838 | 1839 | Portsmouth | William Sprague III |
| | Byron Diman | Whig | 1840 | 1842 | Bristol | Samuel Ward King |
| | Nathaniel Bullock | | 1842 | 1843 | Bristol | Samuel Ward King |

=== Lieutenant governors under the constitution, 1843–present ===
| No. | Image | Name | Party | Term start | Term end | Governor(s) served under | Residence |
|---|---|---|---|---|---|---|---|
| 1 | | Byron Diman | Law & Order | 1843 | 1846 | James Fenner; Charles Jackson | Bristol |
| 2 | | Elisha Harris | Whig | 1846 | 1847 | Byron Diman | Coventry |
| 3 | | Edward W. Lawton | Whig | 1847 | 1849 | Elisha Harris | Newport |
| 4 | | Thomas Whipple | Whig | 1849 | 1851 | Henry B. Anthony | Coventry |
| 5 | | William Beach Lawrence | Democratic | 1851 | 1852 | Philip Allen | Newport |
| 6 | | Samuel G. Arnold | Whig | 1852 | 1853 | Philip Allen | Providence |
| 7 | | Francis M. Dimond | Democratic | 1853 | 1854 | himself | Bristol |
| 8 | | John J. Reynolds | Whig | 1854 | 1855 | William W. Hoppin | N. Kingstown |
| 9 | | Anderson C. Rose | American | 1855 | 1856 | William W. Hoppin | New Shoreham |
| 10 | | Nicholas Brown III | American | 1856 | 1857 | William W. Hoppin | Warwick |
| 11 | | Thomas G. Turner | Republican | 1857 | 1859 | Elisha Dyer | Warren |
| 12 | | Isaac Saunders | American Republican | 1859 | 1860 | Thomas G. Turner | Scituate |
| 13 | | J. Russell Bullock | Democratic | 1860 | 1861 | William Sprague IV | Bristol |
| 14 | | Samuel G. Arnold | Democratic & Constitutional Unionist | 1861 | 1862 | William Sprague IV | Providence |
| 15 | | Seth Padelford | Republican | 1863 | 1865 | William C. Cozzens; James Y. Smith | Providence |
| 16 | | Duncan Pell | | 1865 | 1866 | James Y. Smith | Newport |
| 17 | | William Greene | Republican | 1866 | 1868 | Ambrose Everett Burnside | Warwick |
| 18 | | Pardon Stevens | Republican | 1868 | 1872 | Ambrose Everett Burnside; Seth Padelford | Newport |
| 19 | | Charles Cutler | Democratic | 1872 | 1873 | Seth Padelford | Warren |
| 20 | | Charles C. Van Zandt | Republican | 1873 | 1875 | Henry Howard | Newport |
| 21 | | Henry Tillinghast Sisson | Republican | 1875 | 1877 | Henry Lippitt | Little Compton |
| 22 | | Albert Howard | Republican | 1877 | 1880 | Charles C. Van Zandt | E. Providence |
| 23 | | Henry Fay | Republican | 1880 | 1883 | Alfred H. Littlefield | Newport |
| 24 | | Oscar Rathbun | Republican | 1883 | 1885 | Augustus O. Bourn | Woonsocket |
| 25 | | Lucius B. Darling | Republican | 1885 | 1887 | George P. Wetmore | Pawtucket |
| 26 | | Samuel R. Honey | Democratic | 1887 | 1888 | John W. Davis | Newport |
| 27 | | Enos Lapham | Republican | 1888 | 1889 | Royal C. Taft | Warwick |
| 28 | | Daniel Littlefield | Republican | 1889 | 1890 | Herbert W. Ladd | Central Falls |
| 29 | | William T. C. Wardwell | Democratic | 1890 | 1891 | John W. Davis | Bristol |
| 30 | | Henry A. Stearns | Republican | 1891 | 1892 | Herbert W. Ladd | Lincoln |
| 31 | | Melville Bull | Republican | 1892 | 1894 | D. Russell Brown | Middletown |
| 32 | | Edwin Allen | Republican | 1894 | 1897 | D. Russell Brown; Charles W. Lippitt | Hopkinton |
| 33 | | Aram J. Pothier | Republican | 1897 | 1898 | Elisha Dyer, Jr. | Woonsocket |
| 34 | | William Gregory | Republican | 1898 | 1900 | Elisha Dyer, Jr. | N. Kingstown |
| 35 | | Charles D. Kimball | Republican | 1900 | 1901 | William Gregory | Providence |
| 36 | | George L. Shepley | Republican | 1902 | 1903 | Charles D. Kimball | Providence |
| 37 | | Adelard Archambault | Democratic | 1903 | 1904 | Lucius F. C. Garvin | Woonsocket |
| 38 | | George H. Utter | Republican | 1904 | 1905 | Lucius F. C. Garvin | Westerly |
| 39 | | Frederick H. Jackson | Republican | 1905 | 1908 | George H. Utter | Providence |
| 40 | | Ralph Watrous | Republican | 1908 | 1909 | James H. Higgins | Warwick |
| 41 | | Arthur W. Dennis | Republican | 1909 | 1910 | Aram J. Pothier | Providence |
| 42 | | Zenas Work Bliss | Republican | 1910 | 1913 | Aram J. Pothier | Cranston |
| 43 | | Roswell B. Burchard | Republican | 1913 | 1915 | Aram J. Pothier | L. Compton |
| 44 | | Emery J. San Souci | Republican | 1915 | 1921 | R. Livingston Beeckman | Providence |
| 45 | | Harold Gross | Republican | 1921 | 1923 | Emery J. San Souci | Providence |
| 46 | | Felix A. Toupin | Democratic | 1923 | 1925 | William S. Flynn | Lincoln |
| 47 | | Nathaniel W. Smith | Republican | 1925 | 1927 | Aram J. Pothier | S. Kingstown |
| 48 | | Norman S. Case | Republican | 1927 | 1928 | Aram J. Pothier | Providence |
| 49 | | James G. Connolly | Republican | 1929 | 1933 | Norman S. Case | Pawtucket |
| 50 | | Robert E. Quinn | Democratic | 1933 | 1937 | Theodore Francis Green | W. Warwick |
| 51 | | Raymond E. Jordan | Democratic | 1937 | 1939 | Robert E. Quinn | Pawtucket |
| 52 | | James O. McManus | Republican | 1939 | 1941 | William Henry Vanderbilt III | W. Warwick |
| 53 | | Louis W. Cappelli | Democratic | 1941 | 1944 | J. Howard McGrath | Providence |
| 54 | | John O. Pastore | Democratic | 1945 | 1945 | J. Howard McGrath | Providence |
| 55 | | John S. McKiernan | Democratic | 1945 | 1957 | John Pastore himself Dennis J. Roberts | Providence |
| 56 | | Armand H. Cote | Democratic | 1957 | 1959 | Dennis J. Roberts | Pawtucket |
| 57 | | John A. Notte, Jr. | Democratic | 1959 | 1961 | Christopher Del Sesto | Providence |
| 58 | | Edward P. Gallogly | Democratic | 1961 | 1965 | John A. Notte Jr. John Chafee | Providence |
| 59 | | Giovanni Folcarelli | Democratic | 1965 | 1967 | John Chafee | Scituate |
| 60 | | Joseph O'Donnell, Jr. | Republican | 1967 | 1969 | John Chafee | N. Smithfield |
| 61 | | J. Joseph Garrahy | Democratic | 1969 | 1977 | Frank Licht; Philip Noel | Providence |
| 62 | | Thomas R. DiLuglio | Democratic | 1977 | 1985 | J. Joseph Garrahy | Johnston |
| 63 | | Richard A. Licht | Democratic | 1985 | 1989 | Edward D. DiPrete | Providence |
| 64 | | Roger N. Begin | Democratic | 1989 | 1993 | Edward D. DiPrete; Bruce Sundlun | Woonsocket |
| 65 | | Robert Weygand | Democratic | 1993 | 1997 | Bruce Sundlun; Lincoln Almond | E. Providence |
| 66 | | Bernard Jackvony | Republican | 1997 | 1999 | Lincoln Almond | E. Greenwich |
| 67 | | Charles Fogarty | Democratic | 1999 | 2007 | Lincoln Almond; Donald Carcieri | Glocester |
| 68 | | Elizabeth H. Roberts | Democratic | 2007 | 2015 | Donald Carcieri; Lincoln Chafee | Cranston |
| 69 | | Dan McKee | Democratic | 2015 | 2021 | Gina Raimondo | Cumberland |
| 70 | | Sabina Matos | Democratic | 2021 | present | Daniel McKee | Providence |

== Unusual candidacies ==
During the 2010 elections, the Cool Moose Party of Rhode Island submitted Bob Healey as candidate for lieutenant governor. He ran on the proposition that he would attempt to abolish the office of lieutenant governor itself.
