= Wanton =

Wanton may refer to:

- Incontinence in philosophy
- Wanton (surname)
- Wanton, Florida, later renamed Micanopy

== See also ==
- Wonton
