= Roswell B. Burchard =

American politician

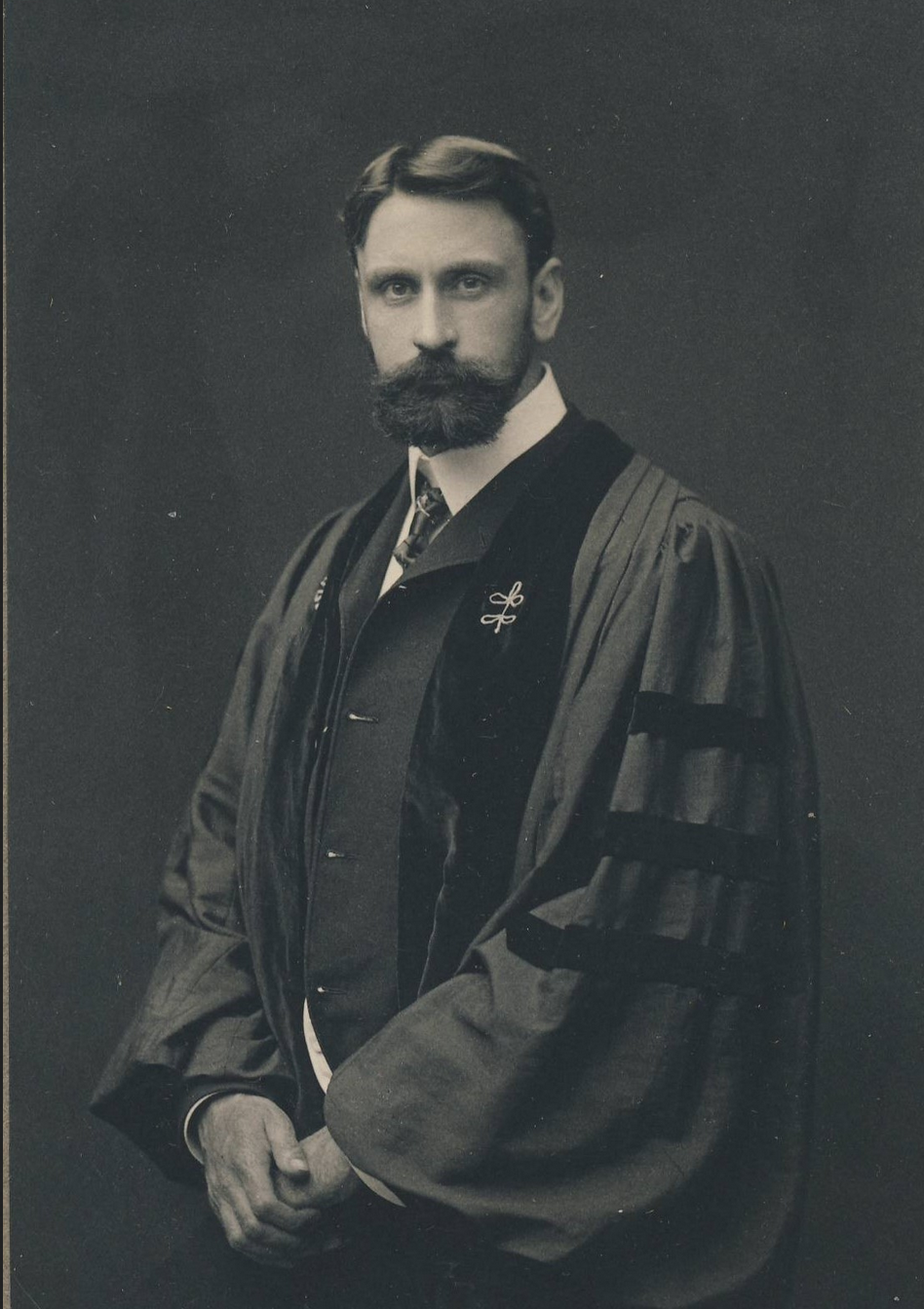

Lieutenant Governor of Rhode Island
- In office 1913–1915
- Governor: Aram J. Pothier
- Preceded by: Zenas Work Bliss
- Succeeded by: Emery J. San Souci

Personal details
- Born: August 20, 1860; New York City
- Died: June 22, 1931 (aged 70); Rhode Island, USA
- Political party: Republican Party
- Spouse: Edith Russel Church (m. 1897)
- Education: The College of the City of New York (BA); Harvard Law School (LL.B.)
- Occupation: Politician, lawyer

Roswell Beebe Burchard (1860–1931) was an American politician. In the years 1913 to 1915 he was the Lieutenant Governor of Rhode Island. He also served as a speaker of the Rhode Island House of Representatives from 1907 to 1911.

== Personal life ==
Roswell B. Burchard attended Eastman Business College before obtaining a bachelors degree from the College of The City of New York in 1880. He married Edith Russel Church in 1897. Later, he passed the bar and obtained a law degree from Harvard Law School in 1903. However it's unknown if he was legally active.

In 1904, Burchard delivered a historical address titled The Town of Little Compton on the occasion of the bicentennial of the United Congregational Church of Little Compton in Little Compton, Rhode Island.

== Political life ==
Roswell B. Burchard was a lifelong Republican serving in both positions he held as a Republican. He served as speaker of the Rhode Island House of Representatives from 1907 to 1911. From 1913 to 1915 he was the Lieutenant Governor of Rhode Island.

Other than his time in office, party stance and responsibilities, information on his political life is scarce.

== See also ==
- List of lieutenant governors of Rhode Island
- List of speakers of the Rhode Island House of Representatives
- Little Compton, Rhode Island

Political offices
Preceded by Arthur W. Dennis	Speaker of the Rhode Island House of Representatives; 1907–1911	Succeeded by William C. Bliss
Preceded by Zenas Work Bliss	Lieutenant Governor of Rhode Island; 1913–1915	Succeeded by Emery J. San Souci
