= Joseph Wanton (disambiguation) =

Joseph Wanton (1705–1780) was governor of Rhode Island.

Joseph Wanton may also refer to:

- Joseph Wanton Jr. (1733–1780), Loyalist in the American Revolution, deputy governor of Rhode Island
- Joseph Wanton Morrison (1783–1826), British soldier
