= Governor Fenner =

Governor Fenner may refer to:

- Arthur Fenner (1745–1805), 4th Governor of Rhode Island
- James Fenner (1771–1846), 7th, 11th, and 17th Governor of Rhode Island
