= Governor Collins =

Governor Collins may refer to:

- John Collins (Continental Congress) (1717–1795), 3rd Governor of Rhode Island
- John Collins (governor) (1776–1822), 22nd Governor of Delaware
- LeRoy Collins (1909–1991), 33rd Governor of Florida
- Martha Layne Collins (1936–2025), 56th Governor of Kentucky
- Thomas Collins (governor) (1732–1789), 8th President of Delaware
