= Wanton (surname) =

Wanton is a surname. Notable people with the surname include:

- George H. Wanton (1868–1940), Buffalo Soldier in the United States Army
- Gideon Wanton (1693–1767), Governor of Rhode Island
- John Wanton (1672–1740), Governor of Rhode Island
- Joseph Wanton (1705–1780), Governor of Rhode Island
- Joseph Wanton Jr. (1730–1780), Loyalist in the American Revolution, Deputy Governor of Rhode Island
- William Wanton (1670–1733), Governor of Rhode Island

== See also ==
- Wonton
