= William Robinson (Rhode Island official) =

28th and 30th Deputy Governor of the Colony of Rhode Island and Providence Plantations
- In office 1745–1746
- Governor: Gideon Wanton
- Preceded by: Joseph Whipple, Jr.
- Succeeded by: Joseph Whipple, Jr.
- In office 1747–1748
- Governor: Gideon Wanton
- Preceded by: Joseph Whipple, Jr.
- Succeeded by: William Ellery, Sr.

Personal details
- Born: January 26, 1693 South Kingstown, Rhode Island
- Died: September 19, 1751 (aged 58) South Kingstown, Rhode Island
- Resting place: Robinson Burial Ground
- Spouses: Martha Potter (m. 1717; died 1725) Abigail Gardiner Hazard (m. 1727)
- Children: 13
- Occupation: Deputy, Speaker of House of Deputies, Deputy Governor

William Robinson (January 26, 1693 – September 19, 1751) was a deputy governor of the Colony of Rhode Island and Providence Plantations.

== Early life ==
Robinson was born on January 26, 1693, in South Kingstown in the Rhode Island colony. He was the eighth of twelve children born to Mary (née Allen) Robinson (1656–1705) and Rowland Robinson (1654–1716), who married in 1676 and acquired a fortune and considerable land holdings.

His mother was a granddaughter of Governor Henry Bull, and his father was a deputy to the general assembly. He was a relatively late immigrant to Rhode Island, arriving in Newport from Cumberland, England in 1675. His maternal grandparents were John Allen, a wealthy farmer, and Elizabeth (née Brown) Allen.

== Career ==
Robinson was one of the most prominent men in the colony for many years. He first served in a civil capacity in 1724, becoming Deputy to the General Assembly from South Kingstown, and he served another eight terms. He was the Speaker of the House of Deputies in 1735 and 1741. In 1742, he was appointed by the Assembly with four others to determine if the "woods" part of Newport (consisting mostly of farmers) should be set apart from the "compact" part of Newport (consisting mostly of merchants and tradesmen). The following year, the "woods" part became the new town of Middletown.

In 1745, Robinson was selected as Deputy Governor of the colony for a one year term, and then selected again in 1747 for another term, serving under Governor Gideon Wanton both times.

In the early 18th century, Robinson began the serious development of the Narragansett Pacer with a stallion named "Old Snip", speculated to be either an Irish Hobby or an Andalusian and considered the father of the breed.

Robinson enslaved numerous people throughout his lifetime. At the time of his death, his estate included 19 people named in his will Old Sue, Old Mingo, Jeffrey, Lucy, Phillis, Peter Knowles, Sue, Cynthia, Simon, Old Peter, Lydia, Roco, Young Peter, Jo, Jack, James, Jemmy, Samuel, Isabel and Nanna. Upon his wife Abigail's death, her estate included the enslaved people Mingo and Morocco.

== Personal life ==
Robinson married twice, had 13 children, and resided at South Kingstown. His first marriage was in 1717 to Martha Potter (1692–1725), the daughter of John and Sarah (née Wilson) Potter. William and Martha were the parents of five children:

- Rowland (1720–1806), who married Anstis Gardiner (1721–1773) in 1741.
- John (1721–1739), who died unmarried.
- Margaret (1722–1768), who married William Mumford in 1745.
- Elizabeth (1724–1804), who married Thomas Hazard in 1742 and was the grandmother of Rowland G. Hazard.
- Martha (1725–1768), who married Latham Clarke in 1747.

Following Martha's death in 1725, he married Abigail (née Gardiner) Hazard (1700–1772) in March 1727 in Kings County (now known as Washington County, Rhode Island). Abigail was the widow of Caleb Hazard, a sister of Silvester Gardiner, and the daughter of William and Abigail (née Remington) Gardiner. This marriage resulted in eight more children:

- Christopher (1727–1807), who married Rhuhama Champlin in 1752.
- William (1729–1785), who married Hannah Brown in 1752. Their daughter Hannah married Lt. Gov. George Brown in 1776.
- Thomas (1731–1815), who married Sarah Richardson in 1752.
- Abigail (1732–1754), who married John Wanton in 1751.
- Sylvester (1735–1809), who married Alice Perry (1736–1787) in 1756 and became a freeman.
- Mary (1736–1776), who married John Dockray in 1756.
- James (b. 1738), who married Nancy Rodman.
- John (1742–1801), who married Sarah Peckham in 1761.

Robinson died on September 19, 1751, in South Kingstown, leaving a very large estate to his heirs. He is buried in a Robinson family cemetery near Narragansett Pier. His widow Abigail died on May 22, 1772.

== See also ==
- List of lieutenant governors of Rhode Island
- List of colonial governors of Rhode Island
- Colony of Rhode Island and Providence Plantations
- Narragansett Pacer
