= Jonathan Nichols Jr. =

American politician (1712–1756)

34th and 36th Deputy Governor of the Colony of Rhode Island and Providence Plantations
- In office 1753–1754
- Governor: William Greene Sr.
- Preceded by: Joseph Whipple III
- Succeeded by: John Gardner
- In office 1755–1756
- Governor: Stephen Hopkins
- Preceded by: John Gardner
- Succeeded by: John Gardner

Personal details
- Born: 24 October 1712 Newport, Rhode Island, US
- Died: 8 September 1756 (aged 43) Newport, Rhode Island, US
- Resting place: Nichols-Hazard Burial Ground, Portsmouth, Rhode Island
- Spouse(s): Mary Lawton; Mary Bull
- Occupation: Deputy Governor

Jonathan Nichols Jr. (October 24, 1712 – September 8, 1756) was an American politician. He served as deputy governor of the Colony of Rhode Island and Providence Plantations. He was the son of former Deputy Governor Jonathan Nichols Sr. and Elizabeth Lawton. Nichols became Deputy Governor in November 1753 when his predecessor, Joseph Whipple III, resigned amid the collapse of his personal fortune, and Nichols completed his term. In 1755, Nichols was again selected as Deputy Governor, completing his first one-year term, then dying during his second year in office.

Nichols is credited with building a house in Newport in 1748, later known as the Hunter House. Following his death, the house was owned by Deputy Governor Joseph Wanton Jr., a loyalist, and following the American Revolutionary War was owned by William Hunter, a United States Senator, and ambassador to Brazil.

== Images ==
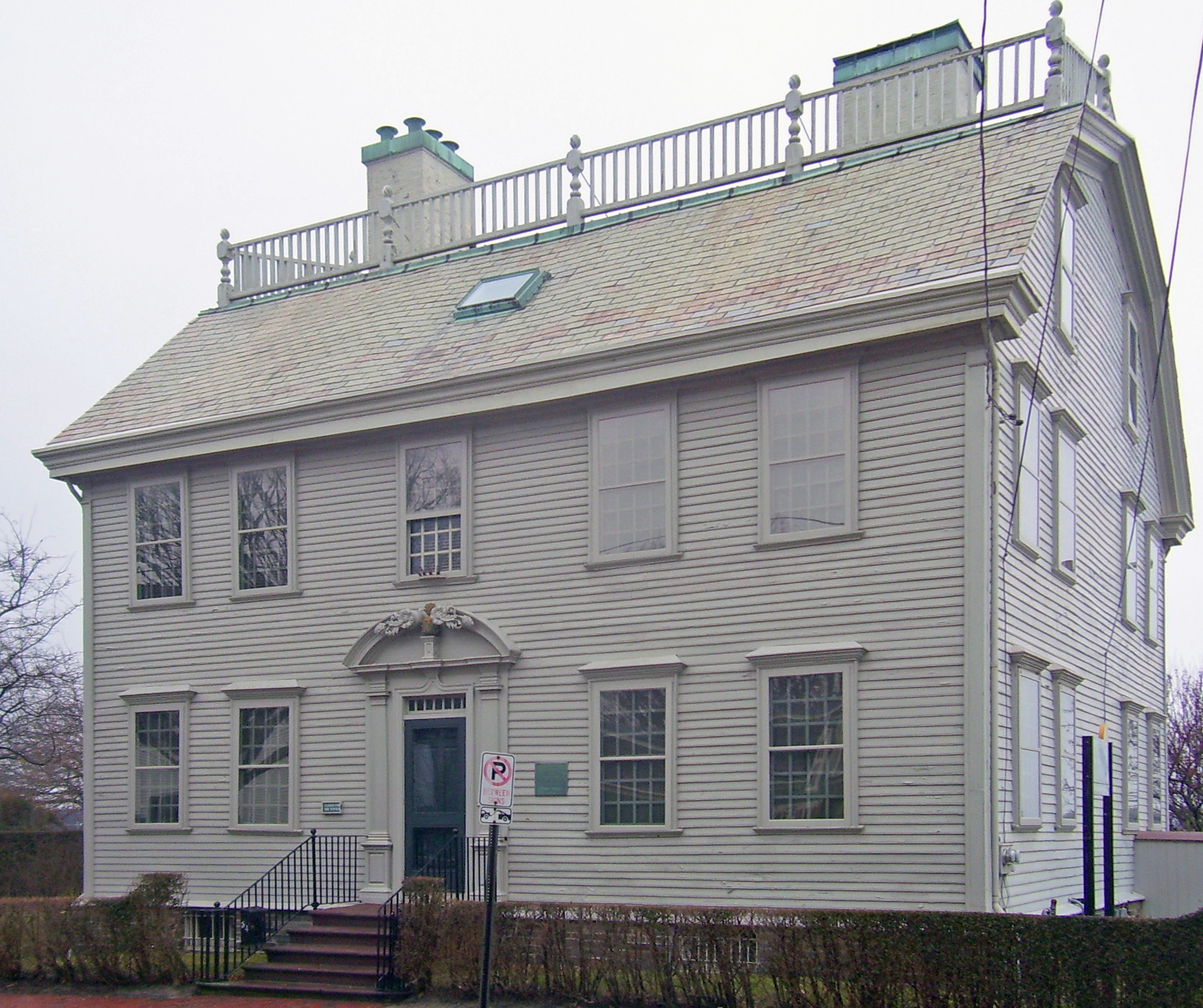
"Hunter House" first occupied by Nichols

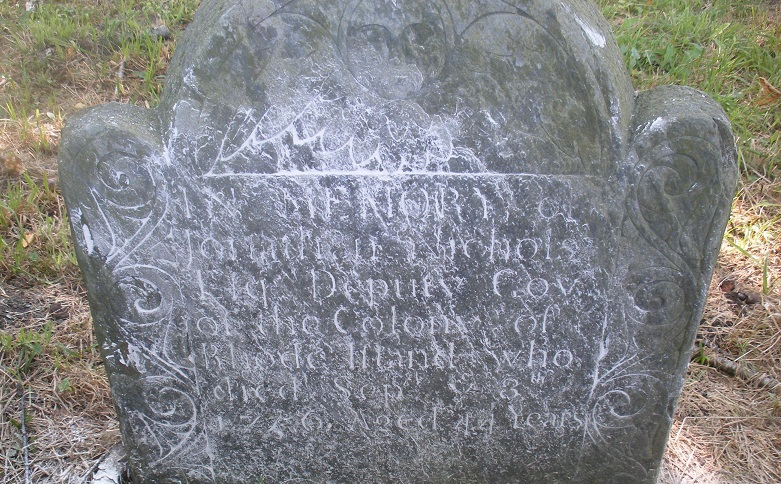
Nichols' grave marker, Nichols-Hassard Cemetery, Portsmouth

== Ancestry ==
The ancestry of Jonathan Nichols Jr. is found in Austin's Genealogical Dictionary of Rhode Island.

Ancestors of Jonathan Nichols Jr.

4. Thomas Nichols (died after 1708)
2. Jonathan Nichols Sr. (1681-1727)
5. Hannah (born 1642)
1. Jonathan Nichols Jr. (1712-1756)
12. George Lawton (died 1693)
6. Robert Lawton (died 1706)
26. Thomas Hazard (c. 1610 - after 1680)
13. Elizabeth Hazard
27. Martha (died after 1669)
3. Elizabeth Lawton (born 1688)
28. William Wodell (died 1693)
14. Gershom Wodell (born 1642)
29. Mary (died 1676)
7. Mary Wodell (died 1732)
30. John Tripp (1610-1678)
15. Mary Tripp (c. 1646 - c. 1716)
31. Mary Paine (died 1687)

== See also ==
- List of lieutenant governors of Rhode Island
- List of colonial governors of Rhode Island
- Colony of Rhode Island and Providence Plantations
