= Joseph Whipple Jr. =

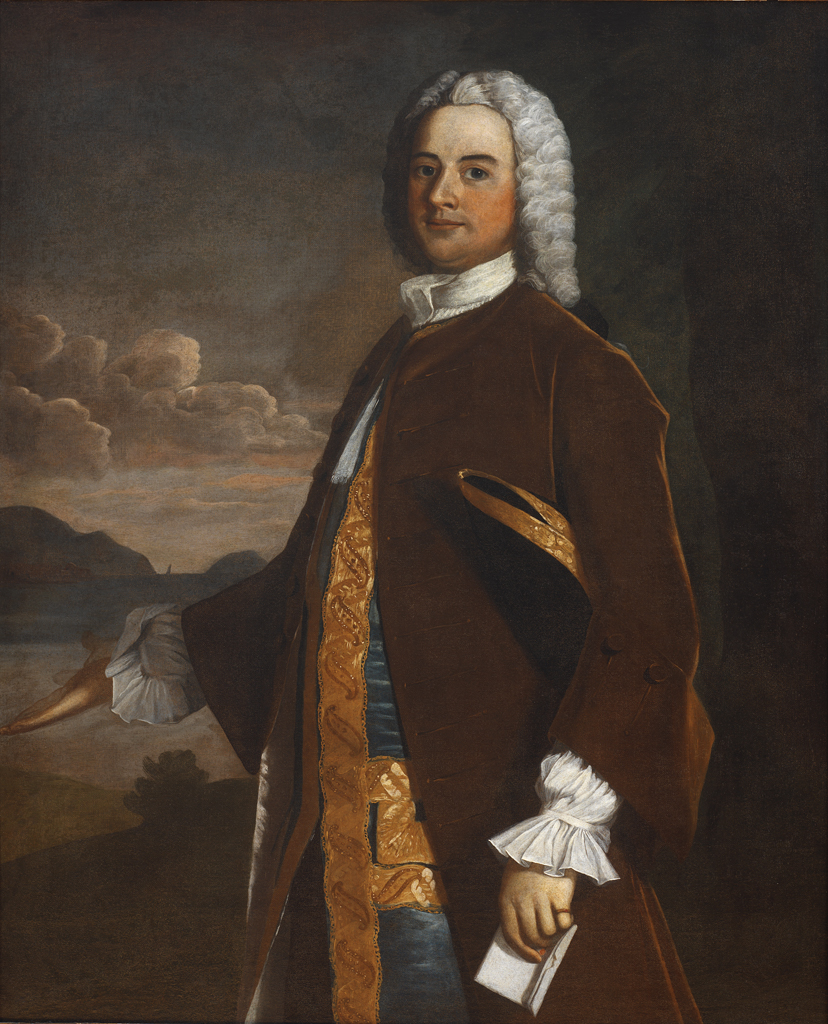

27th and 29th Deputy Governor of the Colony of Rhode Island and Providence Plantations
- In office 1743–1745
- Governor: William Greene Sr.
- Preceded by: William Greene Sr.
- Succeeded by: William Robinson
- In office 1746–1747
- Governor: William Greene Sr.
- Preceded by: William Robinson
- Succeeded by: William Robinson

Personal details
- Born: December 30, 1687 Providence, Rhode Island
- Died: 1750 (aged 62–63) Newport, Rhode Island
- Spouse(s): Anne Almy; Sarah Redwood
- Children: first wife (all died as infants): Joseph, Christopher, Joseph, William *second wife: Sarah, Joseph, Benjamin, Abraham, William, Amey, Alice, Mehitable, Mary
- Occupation: Merchant, Deputy Governor

Joseph Whipple Jr. (December 30, 1687 – 1750) was a wealthy merchant in the Colony of Rhode Island and Providence Plantations, and a Deputy Governor of the colony.

== Life ==
The son of Col. Joseph Whipple Sr. who was also a merchant, Whipple was born in Providence, the third of 12 children. He was a ship-owner, dealing in many goods including slaves, and he often traded illicitly with the Spanish and French who were at war with the British. He was considered the wealthiest member of his extended family of merchants, though the full value of his estate is not found in the public record.

In addition to being very wealthy, he married into wealth as well. His first wife, Anne Almy, bore four of his children, all of whom died as infants, she dying less than two weeks after her last child died. He then married Sarah Redwood, the daughter of probable business partner, Abraham Redwood. Redwood was a merchant, ship-owner, slave-owner and philanthropist who had a large and profitable plantation on Antigua in the West Indies. He was the founder of the Redwood Library in Newport. With Sarah, Whipple had nine children, the second of whom, Joseph III became Deputy Governor at a very young age, following his father's death. Whipple's will was dated May 28, 1750, and proved on July 2 following, suggesting that he died in June 1750.

== See also ==
- List of lieutenant governors of Rhode Island
- List of colonial governors of Rhode Island
- Colony of Rhode Island and Providence Plantations
