= Samuel J. Potter =

American politician, Rhode Island (1753–1804)

Samuel John Potter

United States Senator from Rhode Island
- In office March 4, 1803 – September 26, 1804
- Preceded by: Theodore Foster
- Succeeded by: Benjamin Howland

1st Lieutenant Governor of Rhode Island
- In office 1800–1803
- Governor: Arthur Fenner
- Preceded by: George Brown
- Succeeded by: Paul Mumford
- In office 1790–1799
- Governor: Arthur Fenner
- Preceded by: Daniel Owen
- Succeeded by: George Brown

Personal details
- Born: June 29, 1753 South Kingstown, Rhode Island
- Died: September 26, 1804 (aged 51) Washington, D.C.
- Party: Democratic-Republican

Samuel John Potter (June 29, 1753 – September 26, 1804) was a United States senator from Rhode Island and was a prominent Country Party anti-Federalist leader.

== Early life ==
Potter was born in South Kingstown on June 29, 1753. He was one of seven children born to John Potter (1724–1787) and, his second wife, Elizabeth (née Hazard) Potter (1729–1806). Before his parents marriage, his father was married to Mary Hazard, his mother's elder sister.

His paternal grandparents were Ichabod Potter III and Sarah (née Robinson) Gardiner. His maternal grandparents were Mary (née Robinson) Hazard and Stephen Hazard, a Justice of the Inferior Court of Common Pleas.

== Career ==
Potter completed preparatory studies, studied law, and was admitted to the bar and practiced. He was deputy governor of Rhode Island from 1790 to 1799 (during which time the office was renamed lieutenant Governor) and again from 1800 to 1803. He was also a presidential elector in 1792 and 1796.

Potter was elected as a Democratic-Republican to the U.S. Senate and served from March 4, 1803, until his death in 1804.

== Personal life ==
On September 10, 1788, Potter married Ann Nancy Segar in South Kingstown. Ann was a daughter of Joseph Segar and Mary (née Taylor) Segar. Together, they were the parents of:

- Isaac Fenner Potter (1796–1883), who married Sally Ennis in 1839.

Potter died in Washington, D.C., on September 26, 1804. He was interned in the family burial ground, Kingston (formerly Little Rest), Washington County, Rhode Island.

== See also ==
- List of members of the United States Congress who died in office (1790–1899)

U.S. Senate
Political offices
Preceded by Daniel Owen	Lieutenant Governor of Rhode Island; 1790-1799	Succeeded by George Brown
Preceded by George Brown	Lieutenant Governor of Rhode Island; 1800-1803	Succeeded by Paul Mumford
Preceded by Theodore Foster	U.S. senator (Class 1) from Rhode Island; March 4, 1803 – September 26, 1804; Served alongside: Christopher Ellery	Succeeded by Benjamin Howland
