= 1802 Rhode Island gubernatorial election =

- April 21, 1802
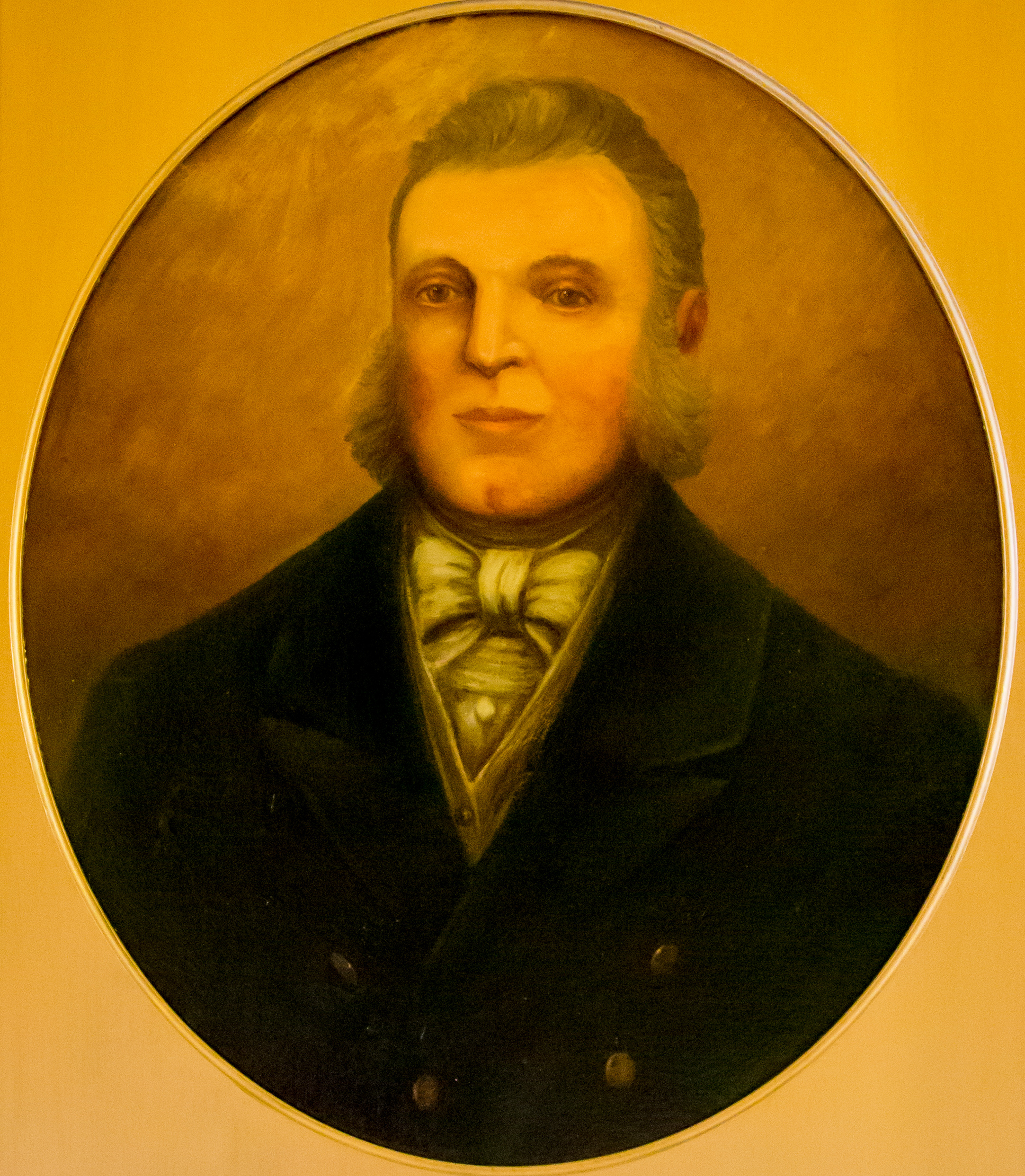

Nominee	Arthur Fenner	William Greene
Party	Democratic-Republican	Federalist
Popular vote	3,802	1,934
Percentage	66.28%	33.72%
- County results Fenner: 50–60% 60–70% 70–80%
Governor before election
Arthur Fenner
Democratic-Republican
Elected Governor
Arthur Fenner
Democratic-Republican

The 1802 Rhode Island gubernatorial election was an election held on April 21, 1802, to elect the governor of Rhode Island. Arthur Fenner, the incumbent governor and Democratic-Republican candidate, beat the Federalist candidate William Greene with 66.28% of the vote.

== General election ==
=== Candidates ===
- Arthur Fenner, incumbent governor since 1790
- William Greene, former governor

=== Results ===
1802 Rhode Island gubernatorial election
Party	Candidate	Votes	%	±%
Democratic-Republican	Arthur Fenner (incumbent)	3,802	66.28%	
Federalist	William Greene	1,934	33.72%	
Majority		1,868	32.57%	
Democratic-Republican hold		Swing		

=== County results ===
County results
County	Arthur Fenner Democratic-Republican		William Greene Federalist		Total votes
County	#	%	#	%	Total votes
Bristol	161	57.3%	120	42.7%	281
Kent	532	53.9%	455	46.1%	987
Newport	695	61.7%	432	38.3%	1,127
Providence	1,546	70.6%	645	29.4%	2,191
Washington	868	75.5%	282	24.5%	1,150
Totals	3,802	66.3%	1,934	33.7%	5,736
