= Elisha Brown =

39th Deputy Governor of the Colony of Rhode Island and Providence Plantations
- In office 1765–1767
- Governor: Samuel Ward
- Preceded by: Joseph Wanton Jr.
- Succeeded by: Joseph Wanton Jr.

Personal details
- Born: 25 May 1717 Providence, Rhode Island
- Died: 20 April 1802 (aged 84) North Providence, Rhode Island
- Spouse(s): Martha Smith; Hannah (Barker) Cushing
- Occupation: Deputy Governor

Elisha Brown (25 May 1717 – 20 April 1802) was a deputy governor of the Colony of Rhode Island and Providence Plantations. He was the son of James and Mary (Harris) Brown, and the great grandson of early Rhode Island settler and Baptist minister Chad Brown. Brown was a member of the General Assembly, and possessed a large property, which was lost during the financial difficulties of the mid-18th century. During the Ward-Hopkins controversy, he sided with Samuel Ward, and during Ward's term as governor from 1765 to 1767, Brown was selected as his deputy governor.

Later in life, Brown moved to Wenscutt, located in North Providence, Rhode Island, and became a member of the Society of Friends. He had first married Martha, the daughter of John and Deborah (Angell) Smith, and a great granddaughter of both colonial president Gregory Dexter as well as Roger Williams' associate Thomas Angell. Following her death, he married Hannah Cushing, the widow of Elijah Cushing, and the daughter of James Barker.

He was the uncle of wealthy businessman John Brown and anti-slavery activist Moses Brown.

== Ancestry ==
Most of Brown's known ancestry is found in Austin's Genealogical Dictionary of Rhode Island.

Ancestors of Elisha Brown

8. Chad Brown (died before 1650)
4. John Brown (1630 - c. 1706)
9. Elizabeth Sharparowe (died after 1650)
2. James Brown (1666–1732)
20. Robert Hulme
10. Obadiah Holmes (1607–1682)
21. Katherine Johnson
5. Mary Holmes (died after 1690)
11. Catharine Hyde (died after 1682)
1. Elisha Brown (1717–1802)
12. William Harris (1610–1681)
6. Andrew Harris (1635–1686)
13. Susannah (died after 1682)
3. Mary Harris (1671–1736)
28. Henry Tew
14. Richard Tew (died c. 1673)
7. Mary Tew (1647 - after 1688)
30. William Clarke
15. Mary Clarke (died after 1687)

== See also ==
- List of lieutenant governors of Rhode Island
- List of colonial governors of Rhode Island
- Colony of Rhode Island and Providence Plantations
