= Zenas Work Bliss =

Rhode Island politician

Zenas Work Bliss (January 10, 1867 – January 10, 1957) served as Lieutenant Governor of Rhode Island from 1910 until 1913 under Governor Aram J. Pothier.

== Early life ==
Bliss was born in Johnston, Rhode Island, on January 10, 1867. He was the son of Medal of Honor recipient Major General Zenas Bliss and his wife, Martha Nancy (Work) Bliss. He graduated from the Massachusetts Institute of Technology in 1889.

== Career ==
Bliss pursued a career in real estate and lived at 238 Armington Street in the Edgewood neighborhood of Cranston, Rhode Island. He was married on October 26, 1892 to Lydia Collins Kelly (1869-1950).

Bliss was elected as a Republican to the Rhode Island House of Representatives in 1902 and served from 1903 to 1909. He was chairman of the House Finance Committee from 1904 to 1909. In 1909 he was elected Lieutenant Governor of Rhode Island and served from 1910 to 1913 under Governor Aram J. Pothier. He then served as chairman of the Rhode Island State Tax Commission from 1912 to 1935.

== Memberships ==
He was a Unitarian and a member of the American Economic Association, the American Political Science Association and the Freemasons. He was also a hereditary companion of the Loyal Legion by right of his father's service as an officer in the Union Army during the American Civil War.

== Honors ==
He received an honorary Master of Arts (AM) from Brown University in 1916 and an honorary Doctor of Science (D. Sc.) from Rhode Island State College in 1919. Bliss Hall, housing the College of Engineering at the University of Rhode Island was named in his honor.

== Death ==
Lieutenant Governor Bliss died in Cranston on his 90th birthday, January 10, 1957. He was interred at Swan Point Cemetery in Providence, Rhode Island. A widower, he was survived by his son, Brown University professor and provost Zenas Randall Bliss II (1898-1993).

== Sources ==
- Who Was Who in America. Volume III. 1951 - 1960. (pg. 83)

Political offices
Preceded by Arthur W. Dennis	Lieutenant Governor of Rhode Island; 1904–1905	Succeeded by Roswell B. Burchard
