= Hunter House (Newport, Rhode Island) =

Historic house in Rhode Island, United States

- U.S. National Register of Historic Places
- U.S. National Historic Landmark
- U.S. National Historic Landmark District – Contributing property
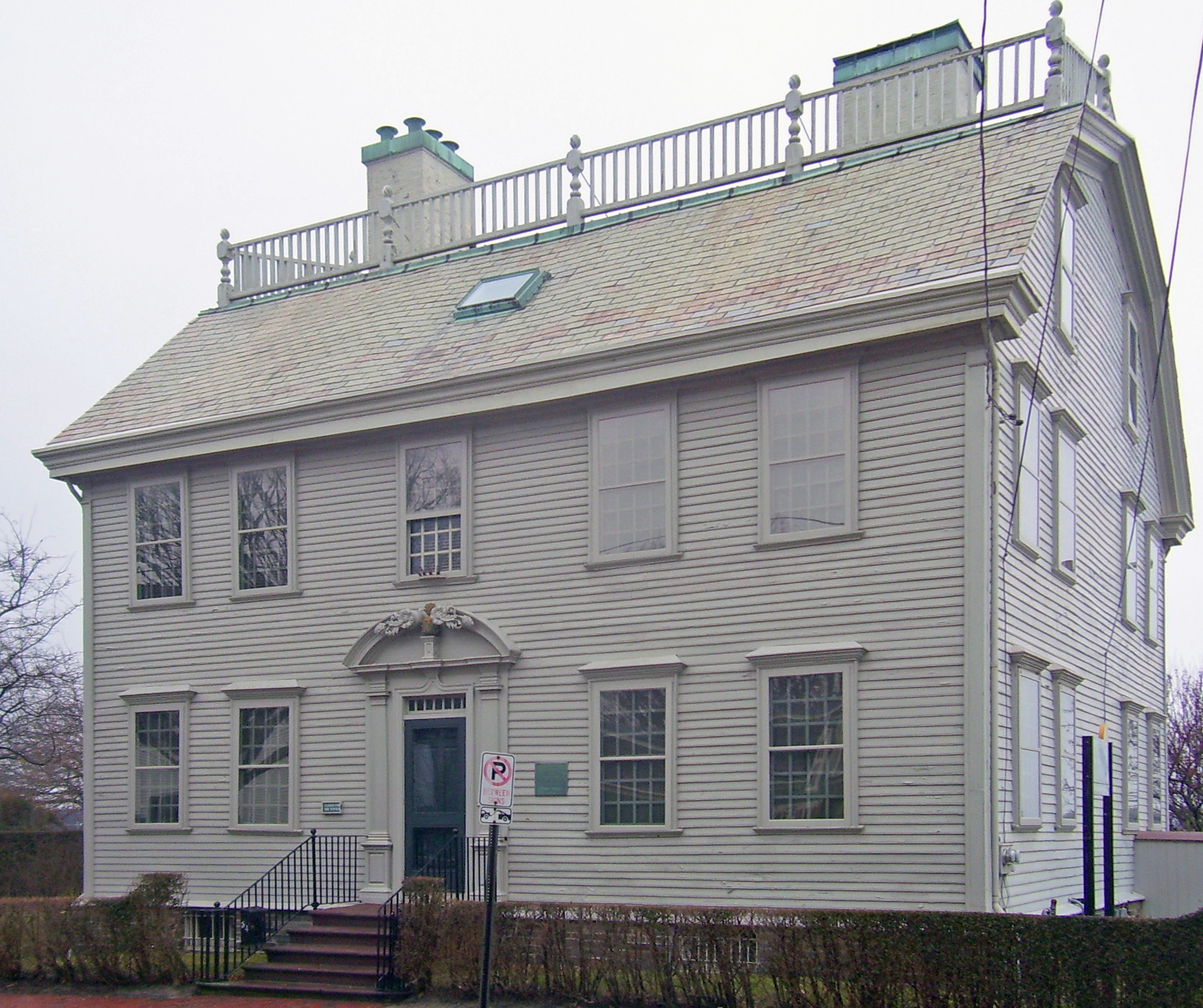
- Front elevation of house in 2008

- Location within Rhode Island
- Location: Newport, RI
- Coordinates: 41°29′33.19″N 71°19′18.14″W
- Built: 1748
- Architectural style: Georgian
- Part of: Newport Historic District (ID68000001)
- NRHP reference No.: 68000003

Significant dates
- Added to NRHP: November 24, 1968
- Designated NHL: November 24, 1968
- Designated NHLDCP: November 24, 1968

Hunter House (1748) is a historic house in Newport, Rhode Island. It is located at 54 Washington Street in the Easton's Point neighborhood, near the northern end of the Newport Historic District.

== History ==
The original portion of Hunter House was built in 1748 for Colonial Deputy Governor Jonathan Nichols Jr. This large 2½-story house has a balustraded gambrel roof and heavy stud construction. In 1756, the property was sold to Colonel Joseph Wanton Jr., who was a deputy governor of the colony and a merchant. Wanton enlarged the house by adding a south wing and a second chimney, transforming the building into a formal Georgian mansion with a large central hall.

Wanton remained a Loyalist during the American Revolution, and General William West ordered him to be imprisoned in Providence and tried by the legislature. He ultimately fled Newport when the British left the city. Local legend has it that space was at a premium aboard British ships when Loyalists were fleeing Newport, but Wanton had his own ship filled with goods and merchandise in preparation for what he hoped would be a short exile. However, the captain of the ship set sail while Wanton was ashore bidding farewell to his wife and turned over the ship to the Patriots in Providence as a prize of war, thus gaining the captain and crew a share of the prize money while simultaneously depriving Wanton of his wealth. The house was then used as the headquarters of Admiral de Ternay, commander of the French fleet when French forces stayed in Newport in 1780.

After the war, Senator and Ambassador William Hunter bought the house and transformed it into a formal Georgian Colonial mansion with a large central hall. The house was purchased in 1945 to prevent its demolition, leading to the formation of the Preservation Society of Newport County, and it was designated a National Historic Landmark on November 24, 1968. It is currently open for limited public tours.

The house displays period furnishings by Townsend and Goddard, paintings (including one by Gilbert Stuart), and a restored 18th-century garden. It is also known for its woodwork, including a carved pineapple over the doorway, a symbol of welcome throughout Colonial America. During the restoration, cabinetry that had been made in Newport was recovered from as far away as Scotland and installed in the house. Ralph Carpenter supervised the furniture restoration which includes "floor-to-ceiling paneling framed with bolection moldings, intricately twisted balusters on the stairs, eighteenth-century Delft tiles around many of the fireplaces, pilasters with Corinthian capitals, and marbleizing and grain painting throughout."

== See also ==
- List of National Historic Landmarks in Rhode Island
- National Register of Historic Places listings in Newport County, Rhode Island

== Gallery ==
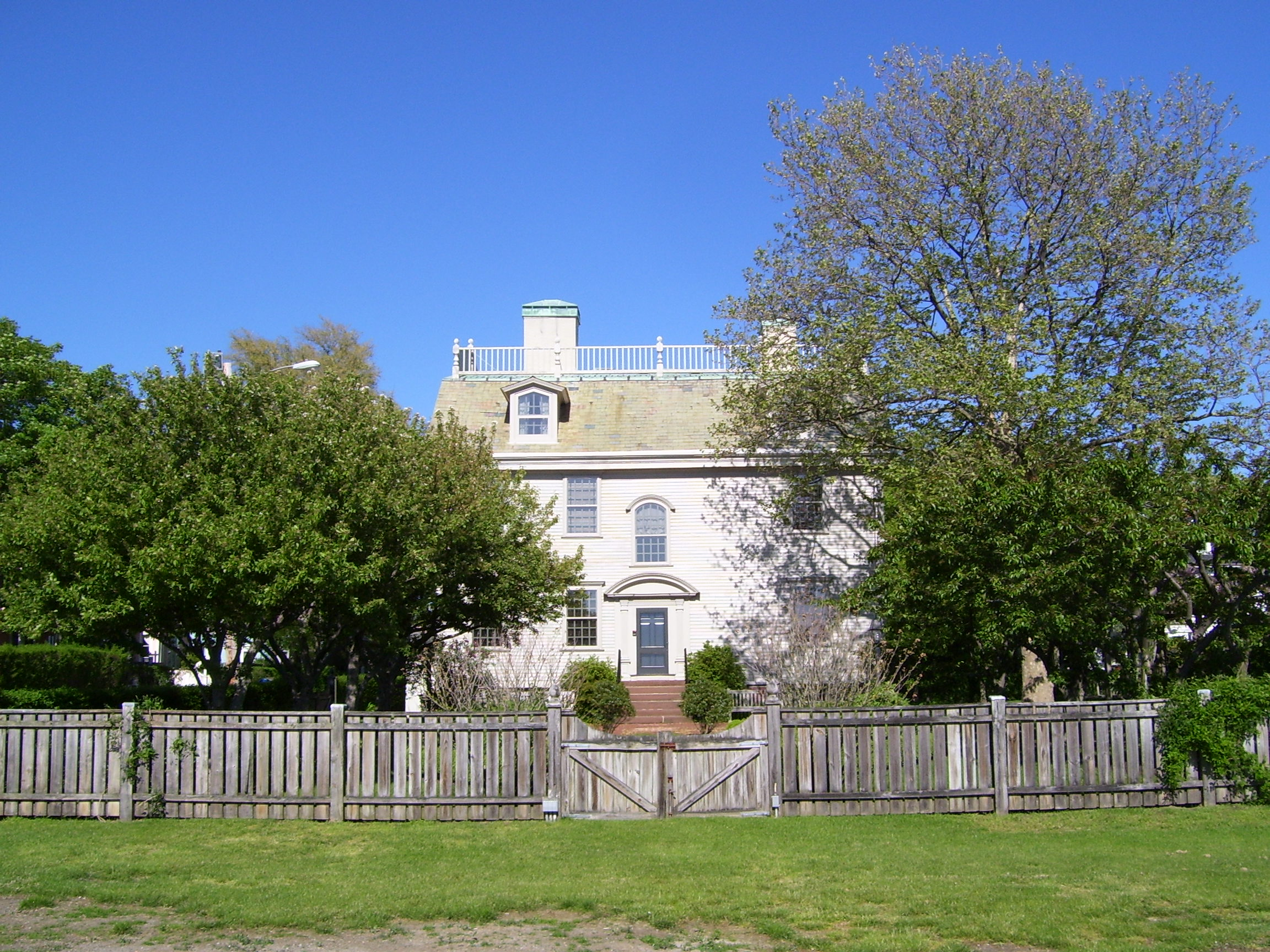
Hunter House from the water side

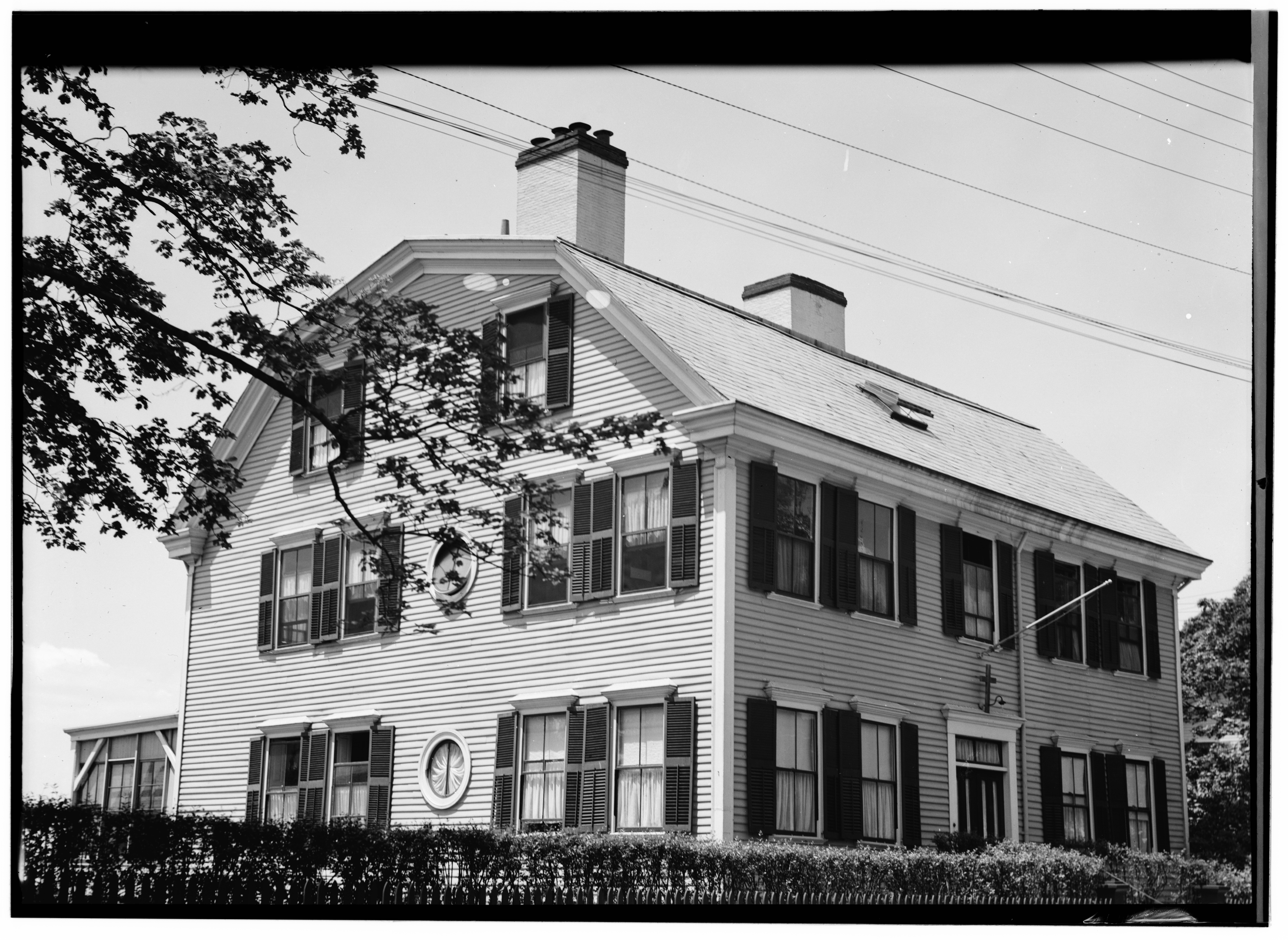
Northwest Elevation, 1937

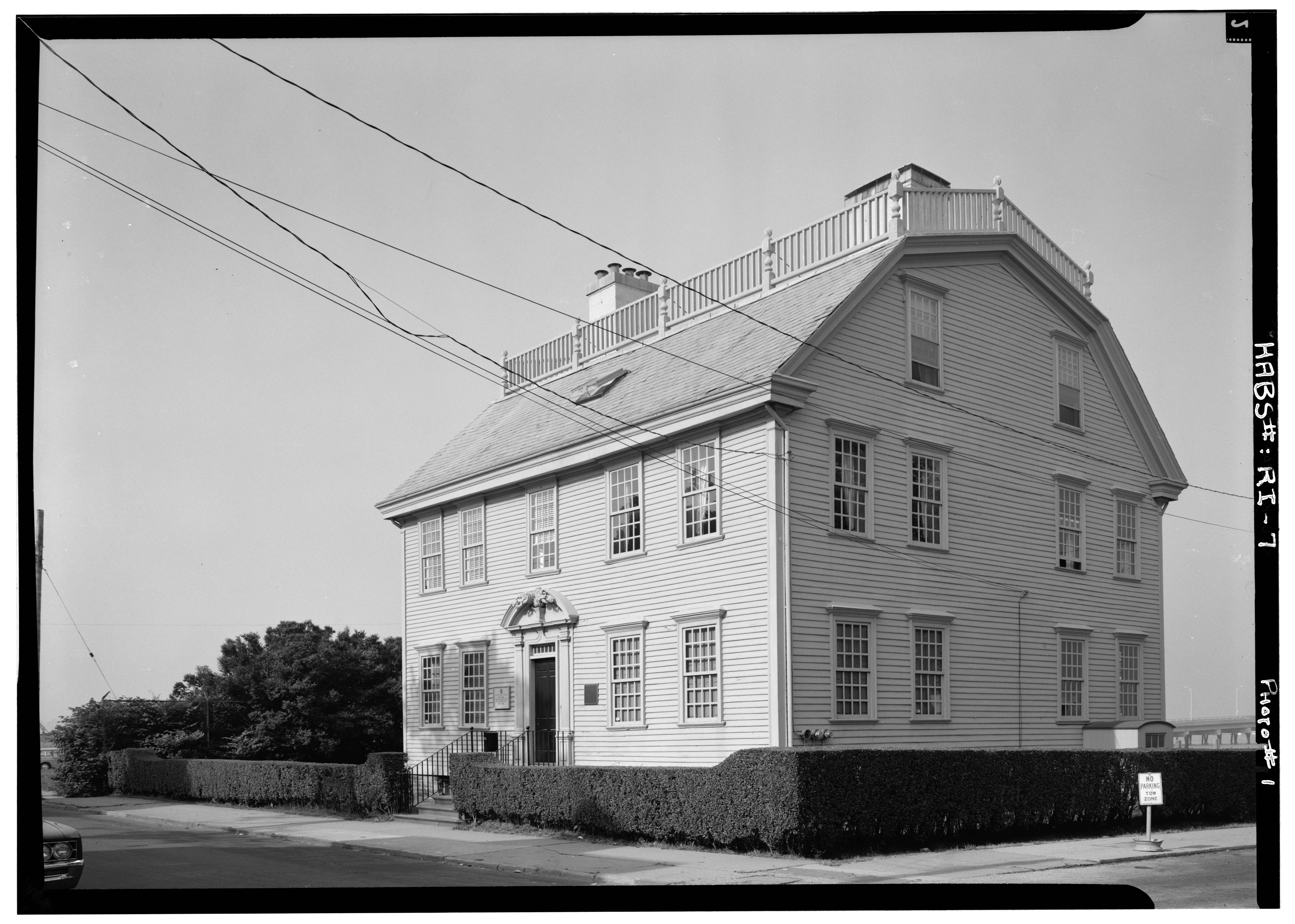
Northeast Elevation, 1971

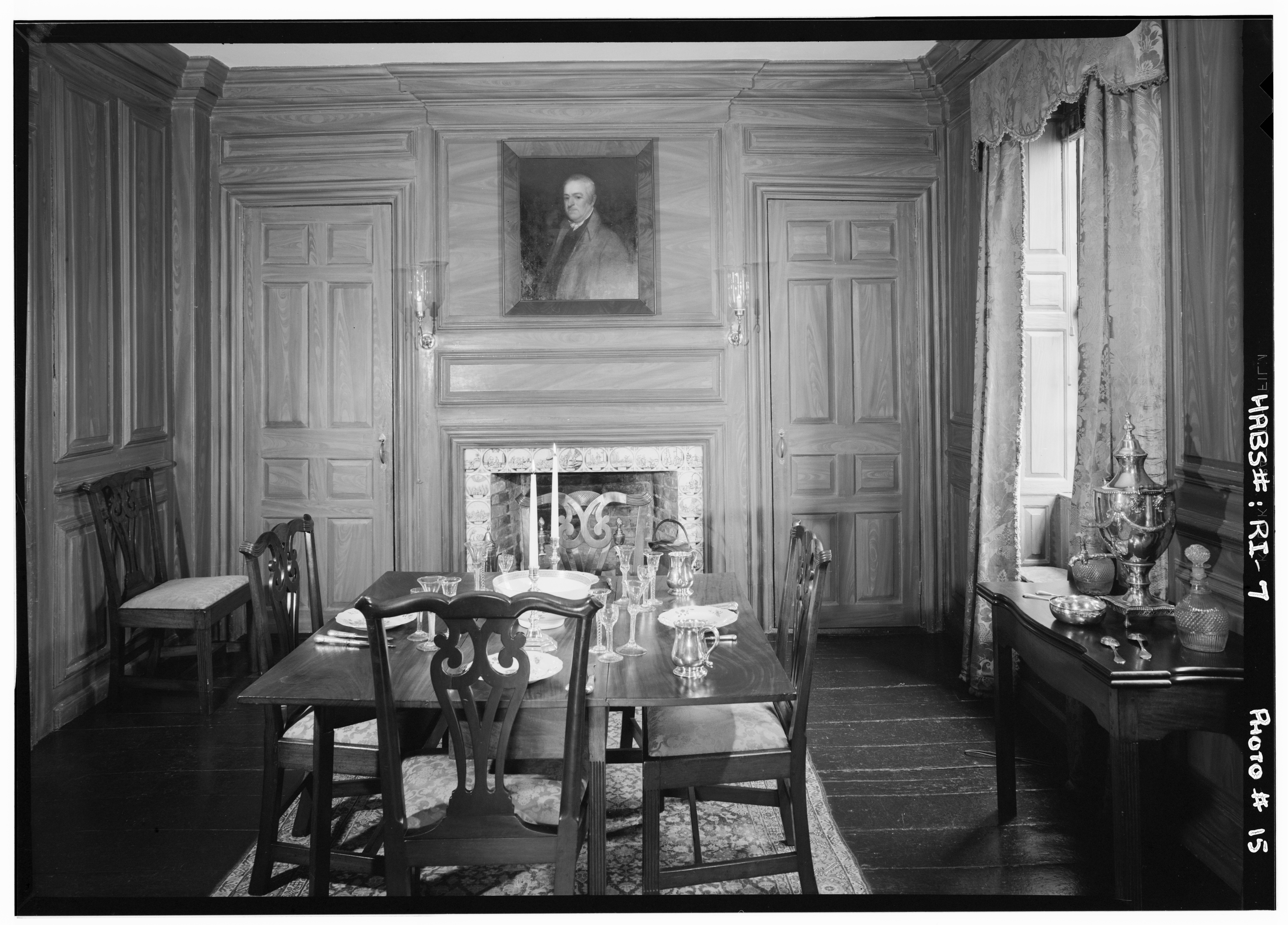
Southwest room, 1971

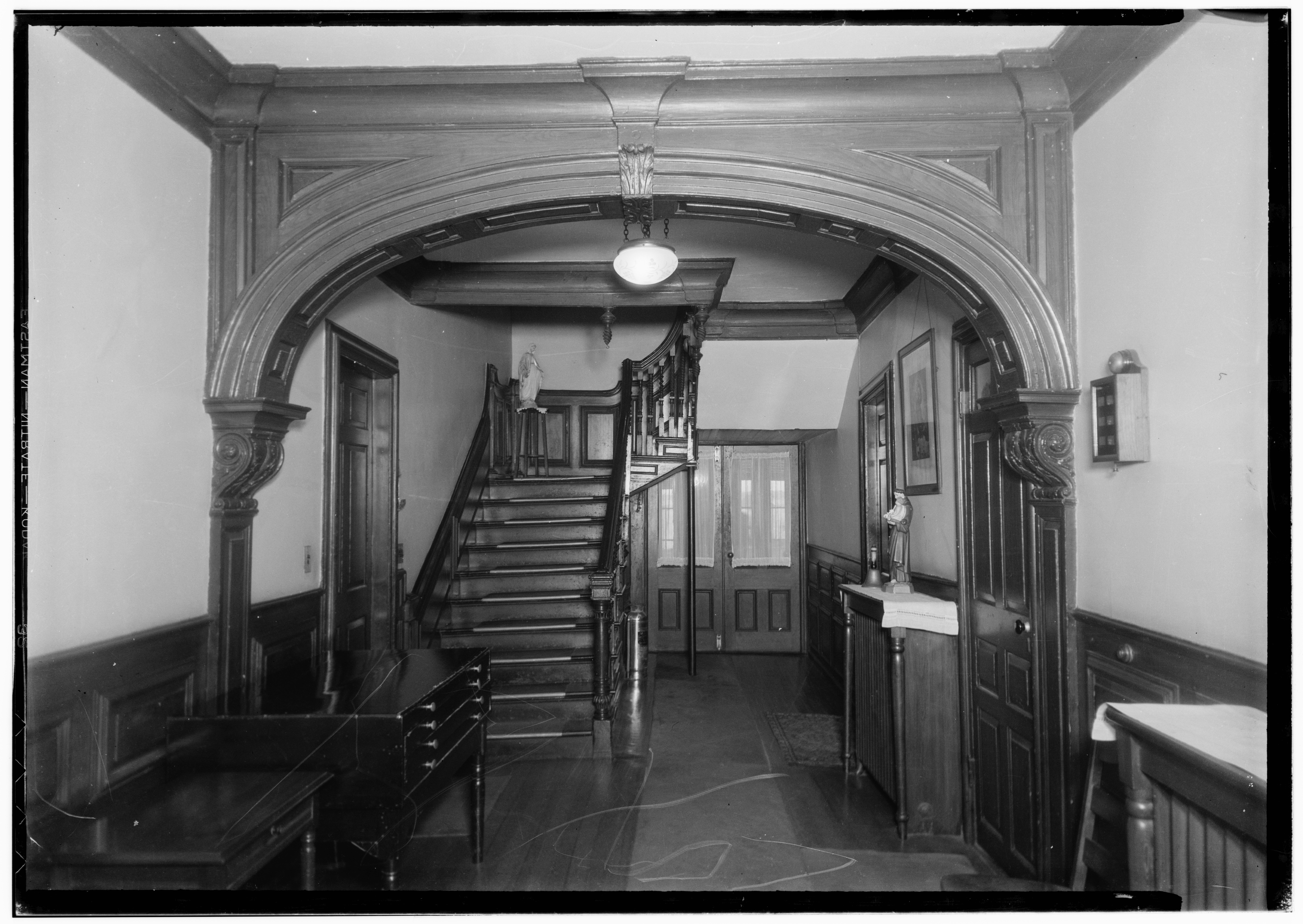
Entrance hall, 1937

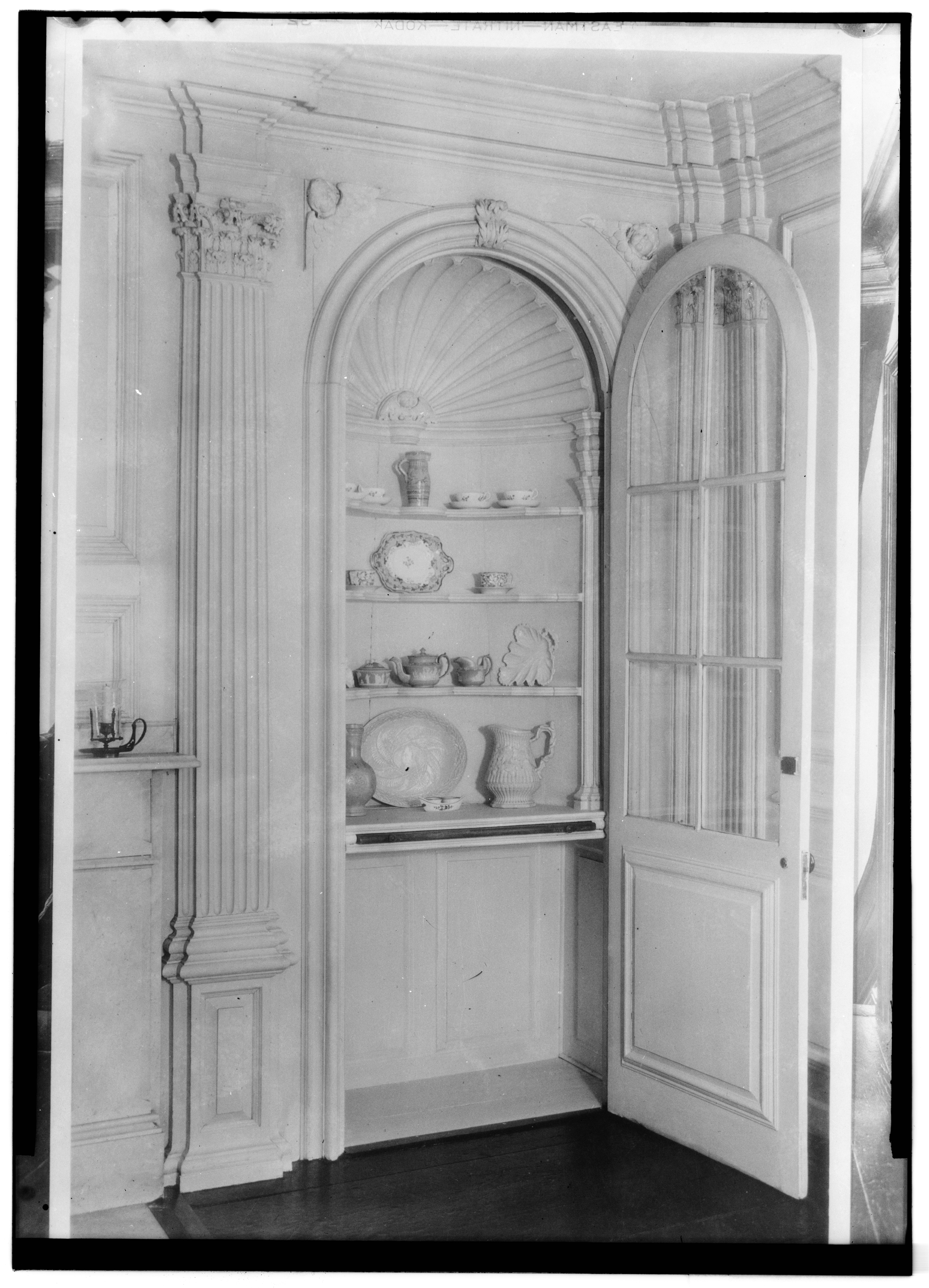
Cupboard in northeast parlor

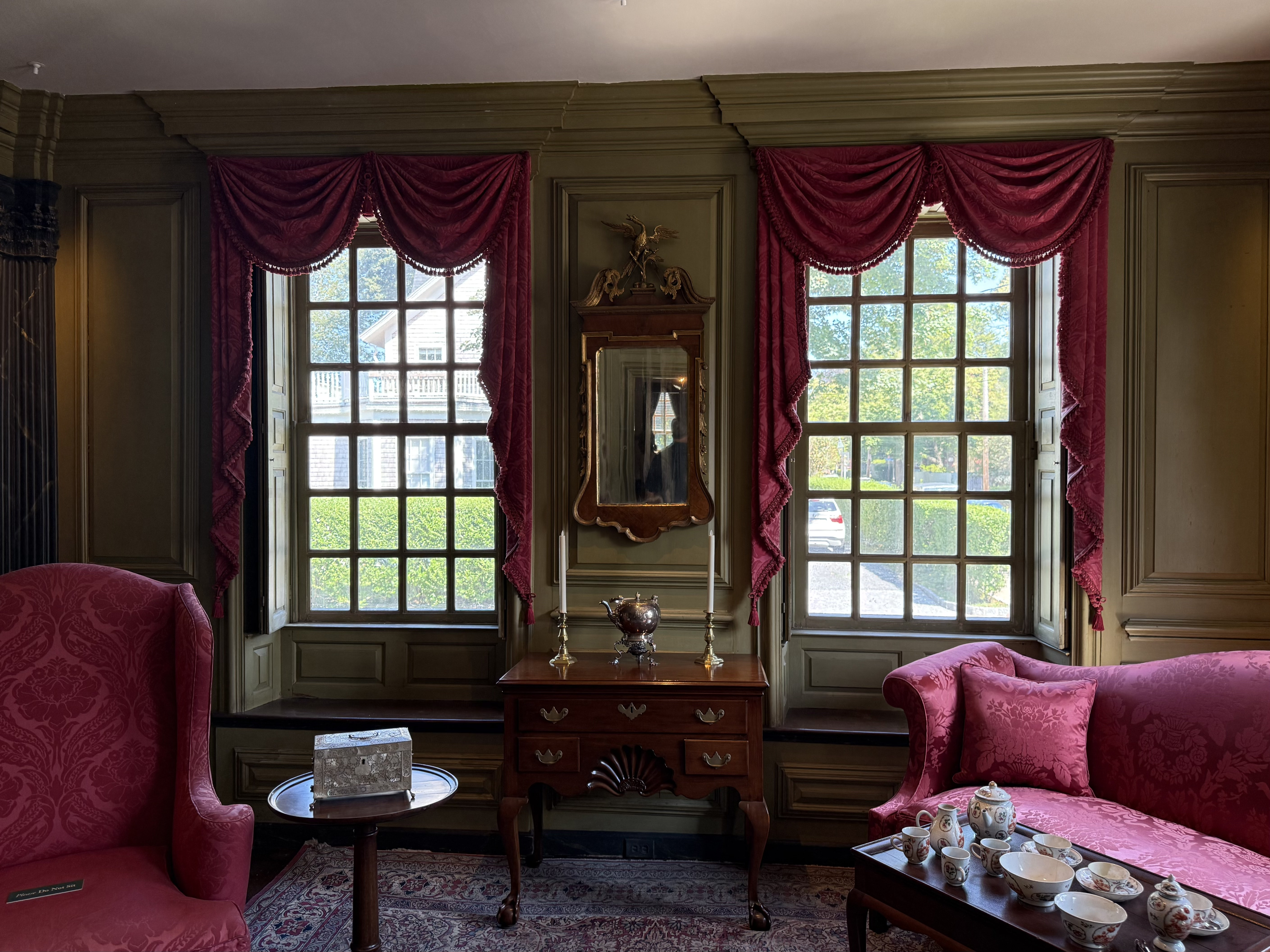
Northeast room, 2025

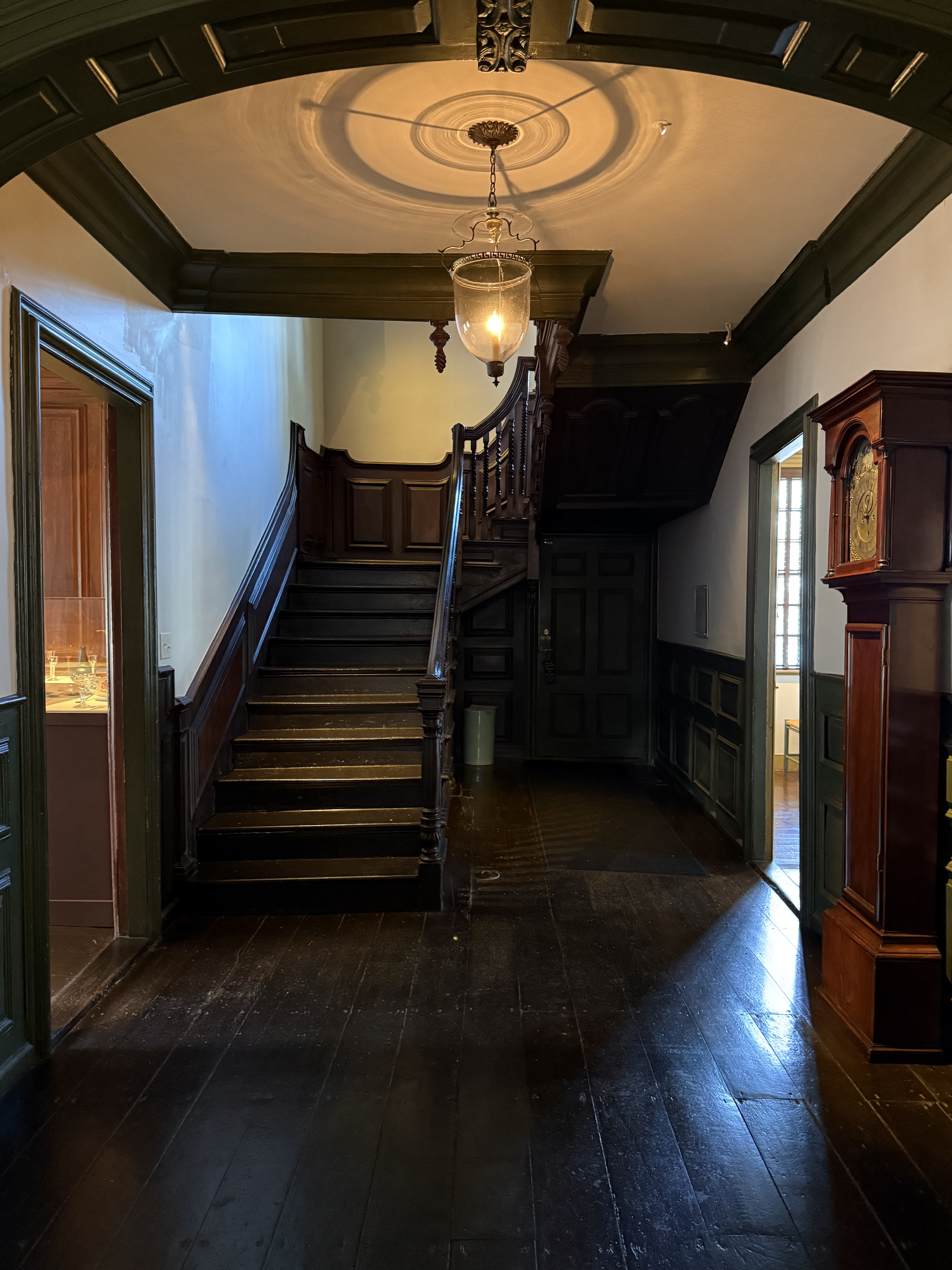
Entrance hall, 2025
