= Joseph Whipple III =

33rd Deputy Governor of the Colony of Rhode Island and Providence Plantations
- In office 1751–1753
- Governor: William Greene, Sr.
- Preceded by: Robert Hazard
- Succeeded by: Jonathan Nichols, Jr.

Personal details
- Born: July 3, 1725 Newport, Rhode Island
- Died: 1761 (aged 35–36) Newport, Rhode Island
- Occupation: Merchant, Deputy Governor

Joseph Whipple III (July 3, 1725 – 1761) was a merchant in the Colony of Rhode Island and Providence Plantations, and a Deputy Governor of the colony.

The son of Deputy Governor Joseph Whipple Jr. who was a very wealthy merchant, Whipple was born in Newport, the second of nine children. He must have had very good political connections because he became Deputy Governor aged 25, but two years later he became financially insolvent, and was forced to give up his position in 1753. He had to sell the farm left to him in his father's will and liquidate other properties to pay his debts. Many ship owners went bankrupt in the middle of the 18th century. The use of paper money got part of the blame for this, but the protracted war with Spain and France had a major impact on commerce. The young and inexperienced Whipple had not yet developed the business acumen to avert these financial difficulties.

After resigning his position as Deputy Governor in 1753, Whipple led a short and anguished life. In 1761, his obituary in the local newspaper, the Newport Mercury, stated "Joseph Whipple, former Dep.Govr. Facted, became intemperate, and was drowned from the Point Bridge, while returning from the theatre on the Point." He is not known to have ever married, nor have any children.

== See also ==
- List of lieutenant governors of Rhode Island
- List of colonial governors of Rhode Island
- Colony of Rhode Island and Providence Plantations
