= John Gardner (Rhode Island governor) =

American judge (1697–1764)

35th & 37th Deputy Governor of the Colony of Rhode Island and Providence Plantations
- In office 1754–1755
- Governor: William Greene
- Preceded by: Jonathan Nichols Jr.
- Succeeded by: Jonathan Nichols Jr.
- In office 1756–1764
- Governor: Stephen Hopkins; William Greene; Samuel Ward
- Preceded by: Jonathan Nichols Jr.
- Succeeded by: Joseph Wanton Jr.

6th Chief Justice of the Rhode Island Supreme Court
- In office May 1756 – May 1761
- Preceded by: Stephen Hopkins
- Succeeded by: Samuel Ward

Personal details
- Born: September 17, 1697 Newport, Rhode Island
- Died: January 1764 (aged 66) Newport, Rhode Island
- Occupation: Merchant, Assistant, General Treasurer, Chief Justice, Deputy Governor

John Gardner (September 17, 1697 – January 1764) served for more than eight years as the deputy governor of the Colony of Rhode Island and Providence Plantations, and was also a Chief Justice of the colony's Superior Court.

== Ancestry ==
John Gardner was the son of Joseph and Catharine (Holmes) Gardner of Newport, and the grandson of George Gardiner who was an early settler of Portsmouth in 1638. One of his great grandfathers was Obadiah Holmes, a Baptist minister in Newport, who was severely whipped in Boston for his religious views and activism; and another was Randall Holden who was a supporter of the dissident minister Anne Hutchinson and who signed the Portsmouth Compact establishing the first government in the Rhode Island colony. One of his great great grandmothers was Frances Latham, the wife of William Dungan, who has been called "the mother of governors," reputed to have had 14 descendants who were governors, deputy governors, or spouses of governors.

== Political life ==
Gardner became a freeman in Newport in 1722 and was an assistant from 1732 to 1737. In 1737 he was on a committee with members from other colonies to help settle the disputed boundary line between New Hampshire and Massachusetts. Four years later he was on another committee to ascertain if two additional companies could be raised for the defense of the colony, and to determine if a fort should be erected on Goat Island for defense of the port. In 1744 he had the rank of Colonel, and was appointed commissary-general. In 1743 he was elected general treasurer, and held this office until 1748, when he once again became an assistant. In 1754 he was elected to the office of deputy governor of the colony, serving for one year, after which Jonathan Nichols Jr. was elected. Nichols died during his second year in office, and Gardner was selected to replace him. Gardner then served in this office for seven more years until his death in January 1764. Simultaneously with his role as deputy governor, Gardner was also chosen as the colony's sixth chief justice of the Superior Court, a position he held for five years.

== Family ==
Coat of Arms of John Gardner

Gardner married on October 23, 1720, Frances Sanford (born January 13, 1702), the daughter of John Sanford and Frances Clarke. The couple had 11 children. Frances Sanford was a great granddaughter of two early Rhode Island governors. One of these was John Sanford, who served briefly as governor of the Rhode Island towns of Portsmouth and Newport, just prior to the reunification of the colony following the Coddington Commission. The other great grandfather was Jeremy Clarke who served for one year as President of the colony from 1648 to 1649.

Ann Gardner, the daughter of John Gardner and Frances Sanford, was married twice. Her second husband was Solomon Southwick, the publisher of the Newport Mercury and a prominent advocate for the Patriot cause in the American Revolution.

== Ancestry ==
Most of the given ancestry of Gardner is found in John O. Austin's Genealogical Dictionary of Rhode Island.

Ancestors of John Gardner (Rhode Island governor)

4. George Gardiner (c.1610-c.1677)
2. Joseph Gardner (c.1669-1726)
10. Robert Ballou (died 1668)
5. Lydia Ballou (died before 1722)
11. Susanna (died after 1668)
1. John Gardner (1697-1764)
24. Robert Hulme (born 1578)
12. Obadiah Holmes (1610-1682)
25. Katherine Johnson
6. John Holmes (1649-1712)
13. Katherine Hyde (died after 1682)
3. Catharine Holmes (1673-1758)
14. Randall Holden (c.1612-1692)
7. Frances Holden (1649-1679)
30. William Dungan (died 1636)
15. Frances Dungan (c.1630-1697)
31. Frances Latham (1610-1677)

== See also ==
- List of lieutenant governors of Rhode Island
- List of colonial governors of Rhode Island
- List of chief justices of the Rhode Island Supreme Court
- Colony of Rhode Island and Providence Plantations
