= George Brown (Rhode Island politician) =

American politician

2nd Lieutenant Governor of Rhode Island
- In office 1799–1800
- Governor: Arthur Fenner
- Preceded by: Samuel J. Potter
- Succeeded by: Samuel J. Potter

Personal details
- Born: January 10, 1746 South Kingstown, Rhode Island
- Died: June 19, 1836 (aged 90)
- Spouse: Hannah Robinson (m. 1768; died 1822)
- Children: 9
- Parent(s): Robert Brown; Sarah Franklin Brown

George Brown (January 10, 1746 – June 19, 1836) was a Rhode Island politician and judge who served as a justice of the Rhode Island Supreme Court from May 1796 to June 1799, and as the first lieutenant governor of Rhode Island from 1799 to 1800.

== Early life ==
Brown was born in South Kingstown, Rhode Island, on January 10, 1746. He was the eldest of four sons born to Robert Brown, Esq. and his first wife, Sarah (née Franklin) Brown, who married in 1745. His younger brothers were William, John and Franklin Brown.

Some sources indicate Brown's mother, Sarah Franklin was a relative of Benjamin Franklin.

== Career ==
Like his father Robert, George was an attorney at law in Rhode Island. He served as a representative in the Rhode Island General Assembly and in 1796 was elected by the Legislature as the second justice of the state supreme court, holding that office until 1799. From 1799 to 1800, Brown served as the lieutenant governor of Rhode Island under Governor Arthur Fenner. Brown defeated the incumbent lieutenant governor Samuel J. Potter, served his term and was in turn defeated by Potter who succeeded him.

Brown owned a nearly four hundred acre farm in South Kingstown, which "formerly constituted one of the most eligible tracts of the Hazards' Boston Neck estates." The head farmer on his estate was John Perry, father of Robinson Perry, and a cousin of Commodore Oliver Hazard Perry.

== Personal life ==
On April 24, 1768, Brown was married to Hannah Robinson (1751–1822) in Narragansett, Rhode Island. Hannah was the daughter of William Robinson and Hannah (née Brown) Robinson and the granddaughter of William Robinson who served as the 28th and 30th Deputy Governor of the Colony of Rhode Island and Providence Plantations. George and Hannah were the parents of nine children together, including:

- Elizabeth Brown (1769–1855), who married Benjamin Robinson in 1791.
- George Brown (d. 1864), who married Mary Brown (d. 1842).
- Abby Brown (d. 1852)
- William Brown (1776–1824), who married Ann Dockray (1779–1845).
- Sarah Brown (1778–1804), who married John J. Watson (1774–1852) in 1798.
- Ann Brown (1783–1872)
- Hannah Brown (1785–1872), who married Rowse Babcock (1773–1841) in 1801.
- John Brown (1792–1833), who married Mary Elizabeth Robinson (1794–1866).

Brown died on June 19, 1836, and was buried in River Bend Cemetery in Westerly, Rhode Island.

Political offices
Preceded by Samuel J. Potter	Lieutenant Governor of Rhode Island; 1799-1800	Succeeded by Samuel J. Potter
