= Ralph Carpenter =

American conservationist, furniture expert (1909–2009)

Ralph Emerson Carpenter Jr. (October 6, 1909 – February 2, 2009) was a conservationist, Colonial furniture expert and author. A descendant of the noted Carpenter founding family of colonial Rhode Island, for more than a half century, he was actively involved in the restoration of some of Newport, Rhode Island's defining structures.

== Biography ==
Carpenter was born on October 6, 1909, in Woonsocket, Rhode Island and was a descendant of William Carpenter who founded Providence, Rhode Island in 1636 along with Roger Williams. He spent his summers in his youth at the family's home in Matunuck, across Narragansett Bay from Newport. He attended Cornell University, graduating in 1931 with a degree in mechanical engineering. He graduated from Cornell University in 1931 with a degree in mechanical engineering, but became an insurance and investment banking executive in New York City, retiring as senior vice president of a securities firm in 1978.

=== Business career ===
After an offer of employment from Alcoa was retracted during the Great Depression, he took employment selling life insurance in Toledo, Ohio before moving to New York City. There he would go from building to building trying to sell insurance, but there was little interest.

Carpenter became a pension plan consultant, obtaining Bristol-Myers as a customer and later becoming partner at Reynolds and Company, an investment bank.

=== Antiques ===
Carpenter developed an interest in antiques that began as a way to acquire inexpensive furniture to fill his Scarsdale, New York apartment. He would visit dealers in Manhattan, purchasing items crafted by George Hepplewhite and Thomas Sheraton.

His 1954 book, The Arts and Crafts of Newport, Rhode Island, 1640-1820, helped bring attention to American Colonial-era cabinetmakers to public attention.

He continued his search for antiques, first keeping them in a warehouse and then constructing a custom-built house in Scarsdale in the 1950s to accommodate the collection. He sold the house and moved to Newport in the 1970s.

=== Historic renovations ===
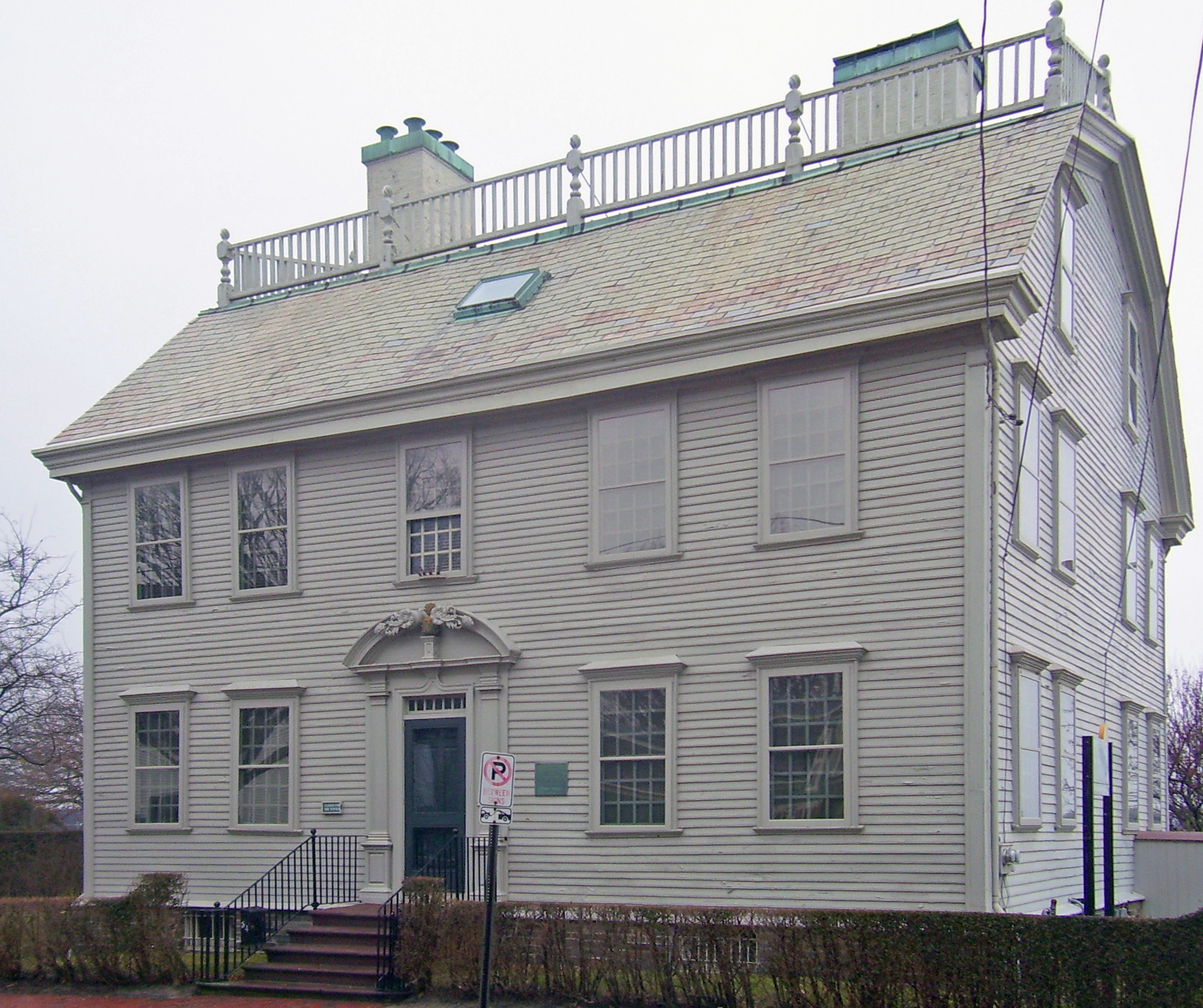
Front elevation of Hunter House in Newport, Rhode Island.

In the 1940s, while antiques-hunting in New England, he revisited the city and was dismayed by the rundown appearance of many of its buildings. After the Hunter House was purchased in 1945 to forestall its destruction, Carpenter was appointed to oversee the restoration of the building by the nascent Preservation Society of Newport County. As part of the restoration effort, Carpenter acquired furniture from Goddard and Townsend, two of the great cabinetmaking families of the area. Morrison Heckscher called the house "a brilliant restoration that gets better with age, and that book of his, written with great intelligence, simplicity and clarity, is one I still turn to 50 years later."

He was asked to reconstruct the Wayside Inn in Sudbury, Massachusetts following a destructive fire in 1955. He also renovated other Newport structures, including the 1673 White Horse Tavern, the 1726 Trinity Church, the Redwood Library and Athenaeum built from 1748–1750 and the 1762 Brick Market, later home to the Museum of Newport History.

=== Post-retirement ===
In retirement, he used his expertise in and encyclopedic knowledge of the decorative arts and antiques to become a senior American decorative arts consultant, a position he held for 30 years.

He was hired by Christie's in 1978, serving as a consultant on decorative arts and antiques. He played a pivotal role in the acquisition of the Nicholas Brown desk-case, which sold for a $12.1 million in 1989 to Harold Sack, a record for a piece of American furniture that stood at the time of Carpenter's death.

Carpenter established the Newport Symposium in 1992, so that art experts could gather on an annual basis to discuss issues of interest. In 1999, his accomplishments were honored with the Henry Francis du Pont Award for the Decorative Arts from the Winterthur Museum, Garden and Library.

To the end of his life, he was an active collector, historian and preservationist, purchasing items that would be appropriate for the many Newport buildings he restored.

== Books ==
Two of his books, The Arts and Crafts of Newport, Rhode Island, 1640-1820, published in 1954, and The Fifty Best Historic American Houses, Colonial and Federal, published in 1955, are credited with bringing American colonial design international recognition.

=== Death ===
Carpenter died at age 99 on February 2, 2009 in Newport. He was survived by his second wife, the former Roberta Lowy; a daughter; a grandchild; and three great-grandchildren. His 1932 marriage to Cynthia Ramsey ended in divorce.
