= William Ellery Sr. =

Rhode Island colonial deputy governor

31st Deputy Governor of the Colony of Rhode Island and Providence Plantations
- In office 1748–1750
- Governor: William Greene
- Preceded by: William Robinson
- Succeeded by: Robert Hazard

Personal details
- Born: 31 October 1701 Bristol, Province of Massachusetts Bay
- Died: 10 March 1764 (aged 62) Newport, Colony of Rhode Island and Providence Plantations
- Resting place: Common Burial Ground
- Spouse: Elizabeth Almy
- Children: Benjamin, William, Ann, Christopher
- Occupation: Merchant, Judge, Assistant, Deputy Governor

William Ellery Sr. (31 October 1701 – 15 March 1764) was a merchant, slave trader, and politician in the Colony of Rhode Island and Providence Plantations during the mid-18th century.

== Biography ==
He was the third of nine children born to the Hon. Benjamin Ellery and Abigail Wilkins of Gloucester and Bristol, Massachusetts, and Newport, Rhode Island. He graduated from Harvard College in 1722, and in the same year was married to Elizabeth Almy, the daughter of Job Almy and Ann Lawton of Newport. He became a wealthy merchant in Newport, and in time served in a number of civic capacities. From 1738 to 1740 he served as a Newport Justice of the Inferior Court of Common Pleas and General Sessions of the Peace. He later served as an assistant and Deputy Governor of the colony from May 1748 to May 1750.

William and Elizabeth had six children, four of whom grew to maturity. His second son, William Ellery, became a prominent Newport lawyer, was a member of the Continental Congress, and one of Rhode Island's two signers of the United States Declaration of Independence.

== Involvement in the Transatlantic Slave Trade ==
Letters preserved in the Ellery Letter-Book and voyage records in the Trans-Atlantic Slave Trade Database reveal detailed instructions Ellery issued to slave ship captains, and provide insight into the mechanics of human trafficking from New England.

In 1746, Ellery co-owned the sloop Anstis with fellow merchant Philip Tillinghast and sent it to West Africa under Captain Pollipus Hammond. Ellery instructed Hammond to trade New England goods for “forty or fifty Negroes,” preferably “mere Boys and Girl[s]” and “some Men,” but “no very small Children.” If the African trade proved unprofitable, Hammond was directed to proceed to Barbados and sell the enslaved people there, retaining “eight likely boyes to bring home.”

A subsequent voyage in 1749, while Ellery was Deputy Governor, followed a nearly identical pattern aboard the brig Success, this time solely owned by Ellery. The invoice for that voyage, dated January 4, 1749, lists a cargo valued at over £13,600 and consisting largely of rum—14,147 gallons in 130 hogsheads—along with pork, beef, flour, sugar, tar, tobacco, and menhaden. These goods were typical of the so-called “triangle trade,” in which enslaved Africans were exchanged for American commodities in Africa and then sold for profit in the Americas.

According to the Trans-Atlantic Slave Trade Database, the Anstis embarked 83 individuals and landed 69 in Rhode Island in 1746. The Success embarked 118 and disembarked 103 in 1749. Ellery's instructions to Hammond emphasized discretion, urging the captain to use his “prudent management relating [to] our slaves.”

== Death and burial ==
Ellery died on 10 March 1764 and was buried in the Common Burial Ground in Newport.

== See also ==
- List of lieutenant governors of Rhode Island
- List of colonial governors of Rhode Island
