= Robert Hazard (politician) =

32nd Deputy Governor of the Colony of Rhode Island and Providence Plantations
- In office 1750–1751
- Governor: William Greene
- Preceded by: William Ellery, Sr.
- Succeeded by: Joseph Whipple, III

Personal details
- Born: 12 September 1702 South Kingstown, Rhode Island
- Died: 1751 (aged 48–49) South Kingstown, Rhode Island
- Spouse: Esther Stanton
- Children: Joseph, Elizabeth, Esther, Stephen, Robert, Samuel, Hannah, Joshua, Stanton
- Occupation: Deputy, Deputy Governor

Robert Hazard (12 September 1702 – 1751) was a deputy governor of the Colony of Rhode Island and Providence Plantations.

== Early life ==
Hazard was the son of Stephen Hazard of South Kingstown in the Rhode Island colony, his grandfather was Robert Hazard of Portsmouth, Rhode Island, and his great grandfather was Thomas Hazard who settled in Portsmouth by way of Boston. Hazard was a first cousin of George Hazard who was an earlier deputy governor of the colony.

== Career ==
Robert Hazard became a freeman of South Kingstown in 1722. In 1734, he became a Deputy in Rhode Island's General Assembly, which position he held through 1749. In 1750, he was elected Deputy Governor of the colony, serving for less than a full one-year term, from May 1750 until his death in 1751.

Hazard lived at Point Judith, at the southern extreme of South Kingstown, on land that he inherited from his father.

== Personal life ==
He married Esther, the daughter of Joseph and Esther (Gallup) Stanton. Together, they were the parents of nine children, including Joseph, Elizabeth, Esther, Stephen, Robert, Samuel, Hannah, Joshua, Stanton.

His eldest son, Joseph Hazard, married Hannah Nichols, the daughter of Deputy Governor Jonathan Nichols.

== See also ==
- List of lieutenant governors of Rhode Island
- List of colonial governors of Rhode Island
