= Arthur W. Dennis =

American politician

Arthur Wellington Dennis

Lieutenant governor of Rhode Island
- In office 1909–1910
- Governor: Aram J. Pothier
- Preceded by: Ralph Watrous
- Succeeded by: Zenas Work Bliss

Personal details
- Born: April 11, 1846 Providence, Rhode Island
- Died: November 19, 1920 (aged 74) Providence, Rhode Island
- Resting place: Swan Point Cemetery
- Party: Republican
- Spouse: Anne Isabel Smith
- Education: New York University, Brooklyn Law School
- Profession: manufacturer

Arthur Wellington Dennis (April 11, 1846 – November 19, 1920) served as Speaker of the Rhode Island House of Representatives from 1906 to 1907, and Lieutenant Governor of Rhode Island from 1909 to 1910.

== Biography ==
Dennis was born in Providence, Rhode Island and attended Providence High School. During the Civil War, he served as a clerk to the provost marshal in Salem, Oregon from 1863 to 1864.

Returning to Providence in 1865, Dennis was in the clerical service of J. L. Aldrich, cotton merchants.

On September 26, 1866, Mr. Dennis married Anne Isabel Smith, who was the daughter of Simri and Sarah (Fuller) Smith. They became the parents of a daughter, Hope Ann Dennis, and a son, John Rhodes Dennis. Anne Dennis died on August 7, 1918.

From 1884 to 1893 he was agent for the firm of Woodward & Stillman, of New York. In 1893 he founded and was elected treasurer of the Elmwood Mills, manufacturers of shoe laces, and held that position until 1912, when he was elected president of the International Braid Company, which made boot, shoe and corset lacings. He maintained the International Braid Company in a profitable state, and occupied a leading position among business leaders in Rhode Island.

Dennis was also a director of the Lawton Spinning Company, and a director of the National Exchange Bank of Providence, R. I.

== Political career ==
Mr. Dennis, a Republican, was active in politics in Providence for many years. During the year 1888-89 he was president of the Providence Common Council. In 1900 he was elected a member of the Board of Aldermen.

Dennis served as the speaker of the Rhode Island House of Representatives from January 1906 to January 1907. In 1908 he was elected to a one year term as lieutenant governor. He served from January 1909 to January 1910.

== Memberships and interests ==
Dennis was a member of the First Light Infantry Regiment of the Rhode Island Militia.

He was a member of the Rhode Island Society of Sons of the American Revolution, of which he was president from 1904 to 1905 and was governor of the Rhode Island Society of Colonial Wars.

He was also a vice-president of the Rhode Island Society for the Prevention of Cruelty to Animals, a past master of What Cheer Lodge, Ancient Free and Accepted Masons, past high priest of Providence chapter, Royal Arch Masons and was past eminent commander of Calvary Commandery, Knights Templar. He was a member of the Pomham and West Side clubs.

Dennis was interested in historical research, and had a valuable collection of early Colonial relics and furniture.

== Death ==
Lieutenant Governor Dennis died in 1920 and was buried in Swan Point Cemetery in Providence.

Political offices
Preceded by Ralph Watrous	Lieutenant Governor of Rhode Island; 1909–1910	Succeeded by Zenas Work Bliss
