= Gideon Wanton =

American treasurer and plantation governor

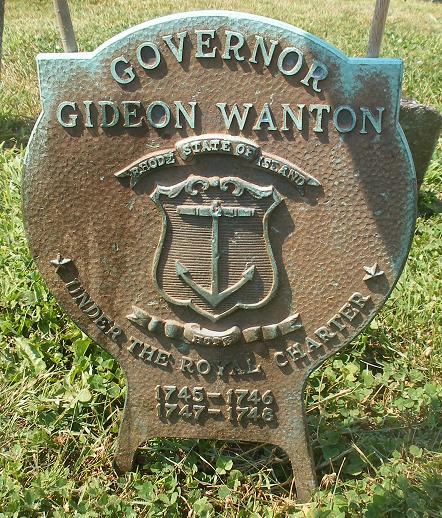
- Gideon Wanton grave medallion

24th and 26th Governor of the Colony of Rhode Island and Providence Plantations
- In office 1745–1746
- Preceded by: William Greene
- Succeeded by: William Greene
- In office 1747–1748
- Preceded by: William Greene
- Succeeded by: William Greene

Personal details
- Born: October 20, 1693 Tiverton, Rhode Island
- Died: September 12, 1767 (aged 73) Newport, Rhode Island
- Resting place: Friends' Burial Ground, Newport
- Occupation: Treasurer, governor

Gideon Wanton (October 20, 1693 – September 12, 1767) was a governor of the Colony of Rhode Island and Providence Plantations who served for two separate one-year terms. His father was Joseph Wanton, a shipbuilder in Tiverton, and his mother was Sarah Freeborn, the daughter of Gideon and Sarah (Brownell) Freeborn. One of his great grandfathers was William Freeborn, who signed the Portsmouth Compact, becoming a founder of Portsmouth in the Rhode Island colony. Both of Wanton's parents were Quakers, and both were public speakers within the denomination.

Wanton was admitted as a freeman to Newport in 1718, and had an active business life. Being fiscally minded, he was elected to the office of general treasurer in 1733, to which office he continued until 1744. While he was treasurer, his uncle William Wanton was the governor of the colony and his uncle John Wanton was the deputy governor. A big controversy existed in the colony at the time on whether to use paper currency or hard currency (coin). Wanton was an advocate of paper currency, and as treasurer he issued 264,000 pounds in bills of credit.

In 1745 and again in 1747, Wanton was elected as the governor of the colony, each time for a one-year term. During his two short terms the British were fighting the French, and a good part of the war was being carried out in the American colonies. The Wantons were Quakers, who generally abrogated war, but John Bartlett, the editor of the Rhode Island Colonial Records wrote, "although Mr. Wanton was a Quaker, he was a belligerent one, and fully equal to the emergency..." Most of the dealings of his two administrations concerned military and naval affairs such as raising troops, equipping privateers, and supplying war materiel.

Following his terms in office, Wanton kept active mostly in his dealings within the Friends (Quaker) society. He died on September 12, 1767, and was buried in the Friends' Burial Ground, sometimes called Governor's Cemetery, on Tilden Street in Newport.

== See also ==
- List of colonial governors of Rhode Island
- Colony of Rhode Island and Providence Plantations
