= John Collins (Continental Congress) =

American Founding Father and politician

3rd Governor of Rhode Island
- In office May 3, 1786 – May 5, 1790
- Preceded by: William Greene, Jr.
- Succeeded by: Arthur Fenner

Delegate to the Continental Congress from Rhode Island
- In office 1778–1780
- In office 1782–1783

Personal details
- Born: June 8, 1717 Newport, Colony of Rhode Island, British America
- Died: March 4, 1795 (aged 77) Newport, Rhode Island, U.S.
- Spouse: Mary Avery

John Collins (June 8, 1717 – March 4, 1795), was an American politician and a Founding Father of the United States who, as a member of the Continental Congress, signed the Articles of Confederation. He was the third governor of the U.S. state of Rhode Island from 1786 to 1790.

== Early life ==
Born in Newport in the Colony of Rhode Island and Providence Plantations, John Collins was the son of Samuel and Elizabeth Collins.

== Political life ==
John Collins stood forth as a staunch advocate for the independence of the Thirteen Colonies. As an admirer of George Washington, Collins was selected by the governor of Rhode Island in 1776 to carry a letter to Washington informing him of the condition of the colony and soliciting counsel upon the best method to adopt for its defense. In 1778, Collins represented Rhode Island in the Second Continental Congress. He served in the Second Continental Congress until he was superseded by William Ellery in May of 1781. Collins was, however, re-elected in 1782 and held his position until 1783.

In 1782, Collins was made bearer to the President of Congress of a statement of Rhode Island's reasons for rejecting the Impost Act. During the American Revolution, Rhode Island was mainly an agricultural area, and as such opposed the restrictions of a national government. The state's agricultural interests vigorously advocated a paper currency. Collins espoused their cause; in 1786 was elected governor. During his term in office, the issuance of paper money—which had been ceased at intervals since 1750—was resumed. It was provided by law that should any creditor refuse to accept the bills of the state the debtor might secure a discharge by depositing the amount of his debt with one of the judges of the state superior court or the court of common pleas. This law led to the suit of Trevett vs. Weeden, which resulted in a decision looking toward the right of courts to declare legislative enactments unconstitutional.

== Rhode Island's ratification of the U.S. Constitution ==
When Washington was inaugurated as President of the United States on April 30, 1789, Rhode Island was one of only two of the thirteen original states (along with North Carolina) to not have ratified the United States Constitution and was, technically speaking, an independent nation with Collins as it chief of state. Anti-Federalist elements in Rhode Island vigorously fought against the calling of a convention to decide upon entering the Federal Union, but on January 17, 1790, gave its sanction to such a call by a majority of one vote in the General Assembly. This vote was cast by Collins, who had come to realize the importance of a Federal connection. The vote cost him his popularity and the governorship. He left office on May 5, 1790. The Rhode Island General Assembly ratified the United States Constitution on May 29. Later, in 1790, Collins was elected to the 1st Congress, yet he did not take his seat.

== Personal life ==
John Collins was married to Mary—the daughter of John Avery of Boston. His daughter Abigail married John Warren. Collins died at Newport and was buried on his farm, "Brenton Neck", near Brenton Point. His grandson and namesake, John Collins Covell (1823–1887), was a principal of the Virginia School for the Deaf and the Blind and West Virginia Schools for the Deaf and Blind. The Rhode Island Society of the Sons of the Revolution holds an annual observance of Rhode Island Independence Day (May 4) at Governor Collins' grave. John Collins was a close friend of Benjamin Franklin when he was young. Collins and Franklin unfortunately broke off their friendship after trouble due to money, as detailed in The Autobiography of Benjamin Franklin 1771-1790.

== Notes ==
Political offices
Preceded by William Greene	Governor of Rhode Island; 1786–1790	Succeeded by Arthur Fenner
