= Joseph Wanton Jr. =

American politician

38th and 40th Deputy Governor of the Colony of Rhode Island and Providence Plantations
- In office 1764–1765
- Governor: Stephen Hopkins
- Preceded by: John Gardner
- Succeeded by: Elisha Brown
- In office 1767–1768
- Governor: Stephen Hopkins
- Preceded by: Elisha Brown
- Succeeded by: Nicholas Cooke

Personal details
- Born: February 8, 1730 Newport, Rhode Island
- Died: August 6, 1780 (aged 50) Manhattan, New York
- Resting place: Trinity Wall Street Church, Manhattan, New York
- Occupation: Privateer, Deputy Governor

Joseph Wanton Jr. (1730–1780) was a Loyalist, merchant, Deputy Governor of Rhode Island in 1764 and 1767, and owner of Hunter House in Newport, Rhode Island.

== Early life and career ==
Wanton was born to Governor Joseph Wanton and Mary Winthrop Wanton of Newport on February 8, 1730. He graduated from Harvard University in 1751 and was involved with privateers during the French and Indian War, possibly where he attained the title of colonel. Wanton's first wife Abigail Honeyman died in 1771; they had 7 children. He was elected Deputy Governor of Rhode Island in 1764 and 1767.

== Loyalist during Revolutionary War ==
Wanton was a loyalist during the American Revolution. He was accused of treason and imprisoned by Rhode Island General William West while the British occupied Narragansett Bay in 1776. When the British occupied Newport, Wanton raised troops for the Loyalist cause. In 1780, his property (Hunter House) was confiscated, and he fled Newport when the Americans reoccupied the city. Wanton likely died in New York in 1780 after fleeing there with the British. In 1781, his widow Sarah Brenton Wanton unsuccessfully petitioned the State of Rhode Island to return the confiscated Wanton properties in Newport, Jamestown, Prudence Island, and Gould Island.

== See also ==
- Hunter House
