= Arthur Fenner =

American politician (1745–1805)

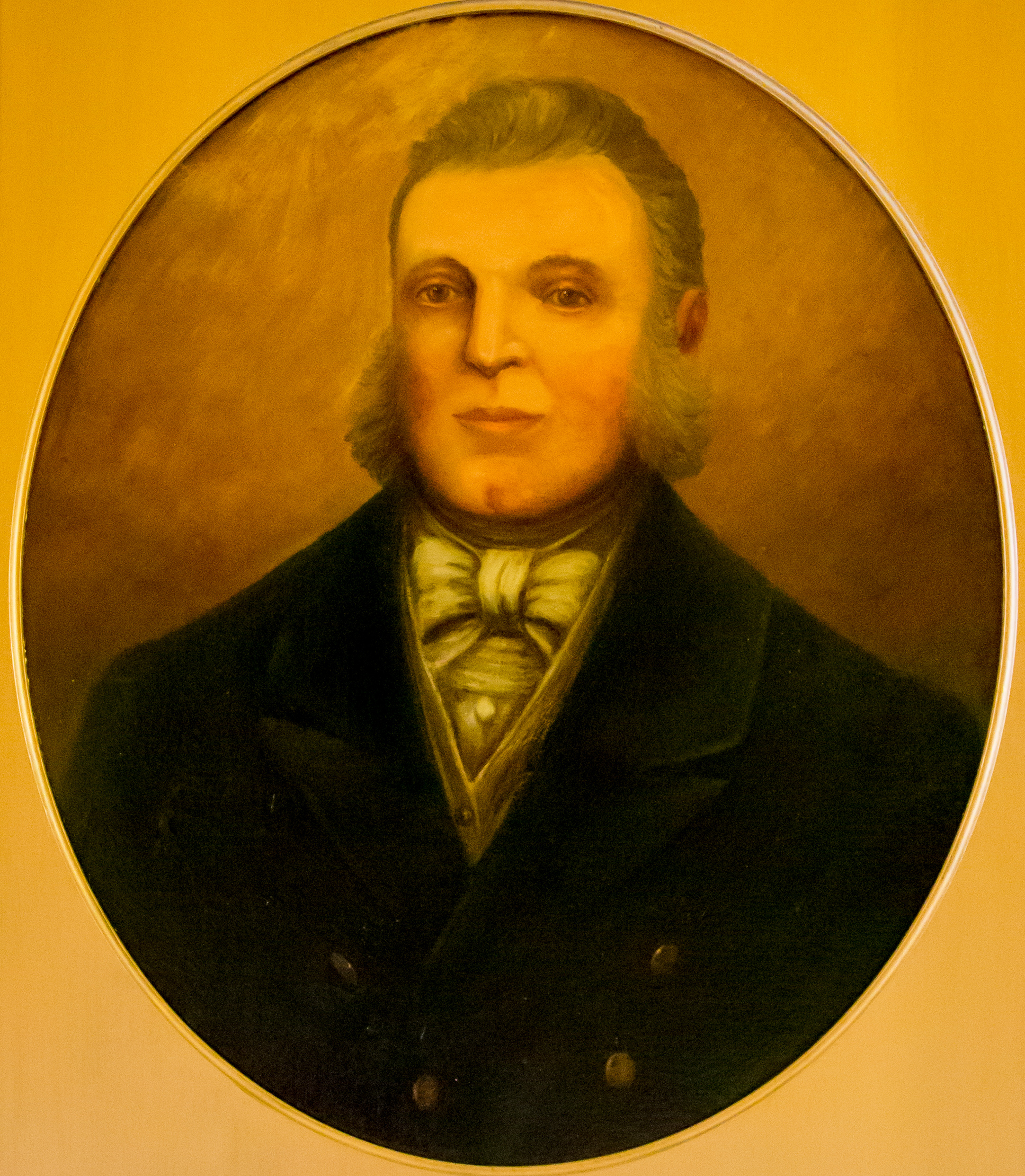

4th Governor of Rhode Island
- In office May 5, 1790 – October 15, 1805
- Lieutenant Governor: Samuel J. Potter; George Brown; Samuel J. Potter; Paul Mumford
- Preceded by: John Collins
- Succeeded by: Henry Smith

Personal details
- Born: December 10, 1745 Providence, Colony of Rhode Island, British America
- Died: October 15, 1805 (aged 59) Providence, Rhode Island, U.S.
- Resting place: North Burial Ground
- Party: Country Party
- Spouse: Amey Comstock

Arthur Fenner (December 10, 1745 – October 15, 1805) was an American politician who served as the fourth governor of Rhode Island from 1790 until his death in 1805. He has the ninth longest gubernatorial tenure in post-Constitutional U.S. history at 5,641 days, and the longest uninterrupted one. Fenner was a prominent Country Party (Anti-Federalist) leader. Around 1764, Fenner joined several others as a petitioner for the chartering of the College in the English Colony of Rhode Island and Providence Plantations (the original name for Brown University).

== Early life ==
Fenner was born in 1745 to a prominent family in Providence, Rhode Island, in the Colony of Rhode Island and Providence Plantations, the eleventh of twelve children. His parents were Arthur Fenner, Jr. (October 17, 1699 – January 21, 1788) and Mary Olney (September 30, 1704 – March 18, 1756). The Fenner family owned a wharf known as Fenner's Wharf, where the Gaspee Affair occurred in 1772. The wharf was located near what is now 155 South Main Street in Providence.

His ancestor Captain Arthur Fenner (1622–1703) had been a member of the Town Council, an associate of Roger Williams, and fought in King Philip's War.

During the American Revolution he served as a lieutenant in Hitchcock's Regiment in 1775 during the Siege of Boston. He then served as a captain in Babcock's/Lippitt's Regiment of Rhode Island state troops in 1776. For many years before becoming governor, Fenner served as the clerk of the Court of Common Pleas.

== Governorship ==
He served as governor of Rhode Island from 1790 to 1805 and died in office. Fenner was governor of Rhode Island when it became the last of the thirteen states to ratify the Constitution on May 29, 1790. The following quote is from the Dictionary of American Biography:

In March 1790, the contest between Federalists and Anti-Federalists in Rhode Island reached its height, (and) the long-delayed convention to decide upon the adoption of the Constitution (had) been called, (with) Governor Collins having become unpopular in consequence. (With the elections approaching,) Deputy-Governor Owen was offered the governor-ship by the Anti-Federalists, but declined to serve. 'A movement,' says Arnold, 'was made in Providence to form a coalition party. The Newport committee united with them in proposing (to put on the ballot) Arthur Fenner, an Anti-Federalist. The Anti-Federalists triumphed, and on May 5, 1790, the general assembly declared Fenner governor and Samuel J. Potter deputy-governor.

Opposition to entering the Union was so strong, … (that a vote to adopt the Constitution) was delayed until the last week in May, and when on the 29th, a decision was reached, the vote stood thirty-four to thirty-two in favor of adopting the Constitution.

Governor Fenner was very popular, and continued in office, serving at the time of his death.

Significant events during Fenner's time in office:

- George Washington visited Rhode Island (August 1790)
- The Providence Bank was established (1791)
- The Weybosset Bridge was rebuilt (1792)
- The Blackstone Canal was begun (February 1796)
- President John Adams visited Providence (1797)
- The Great Fire on the west side of South Main Street, opposite the foot of Planet Street, did $300,000 worth of damage (January 21, 1801)

== Personal life ==
Coat of arms of Arthur Fenner

Fenner married Amey Comstock (c. 1749 – September 5, 1828, in her 80th yr.), daughter of Gideon Comstock of Smithfield, Rhode Island.

His son, James Fenner, gave up his position as a US senator to be elected governor two years after his father's death. James served from 1807 to 1811, from 1824 to 1831, and from 1843 to 1845. Arthur and Amey Fenner were members of the First Baptist Church in America, at Providence. They had five children:

1. Arthur Fenner Jr. (November 9, 1766 – September 27, 1837); fifer in various companies; lived at Fairfield, New York, in 1827; married Lydia Sabin (born 1766), daughter of Thomas Sabin, on December 8, 1787; they had Harriet Elizabeth (February 7, 1805 – May 2, 1829)
2. Amy (February 16, 1769 – May 7, 1772, age 3)
3. James Fenner (January 22, 1771 – April 17, 1846); Governor of Rhode Island, married Sarah Jenckes
4. Joseph (c. 1773 – July 18, 1797, in Providence, age 24)
5. Sally (1778 – August 21, 1794, at Newport, age 16)

Party political offices
| First | Country nominee for Governor of Rhode Island; 1790, 1791, 1792, 1793, 1794, 1795, 1796, 1797, 1798, 1799, 1800, 1801, 1802, 1803, 1804, 1805 | Succeeded by Henry Smith |
Political offices
| Preceded by John Collins | Governor of Rhode Island; 1790–1805 | Succeeded by Henry Smith |
