= Robert Knight (industrialist) =

American industrialist and philanthropist

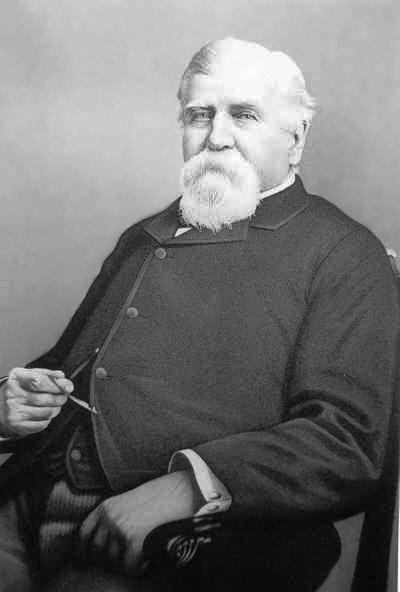
Robert Knight, c. 1891

Robert Knight (8 January 1826 – 26 November 1912) was a New England industrialist and philanthropist, who was a partner with his brother Benjamin Knight in B. B. & R. Knight and was one of the largest textile manufacturers in the world when he died in 1912. He co-founded the clothing brand Fruit of the Loom, now owned by Warren Buffett's Berkshire Hathaway.

== Early life ==
Knight was born in Old Warwick, Rhode Island, on January 8, 1826, to Stephen Knight and Weltham Brayton. After moving to Cranston, Rhode Island, Knight's father put Robert to work in the Cranston Print Works when he was eight years old. Knight later worked in Coventry, Rhode Island, for Elisha Harris until he was 17 years old working for $1.25 per week. In 1843 Knight began working for his brother Benjamin as a store clerk. Two years later with the help of a friend, Knight studied for a year and a half at Pawcatuck Academy in Westerly, Rhode Island, after which he taught school in Exeter, Rhode Island, for four months.

== Manufacturing career ==
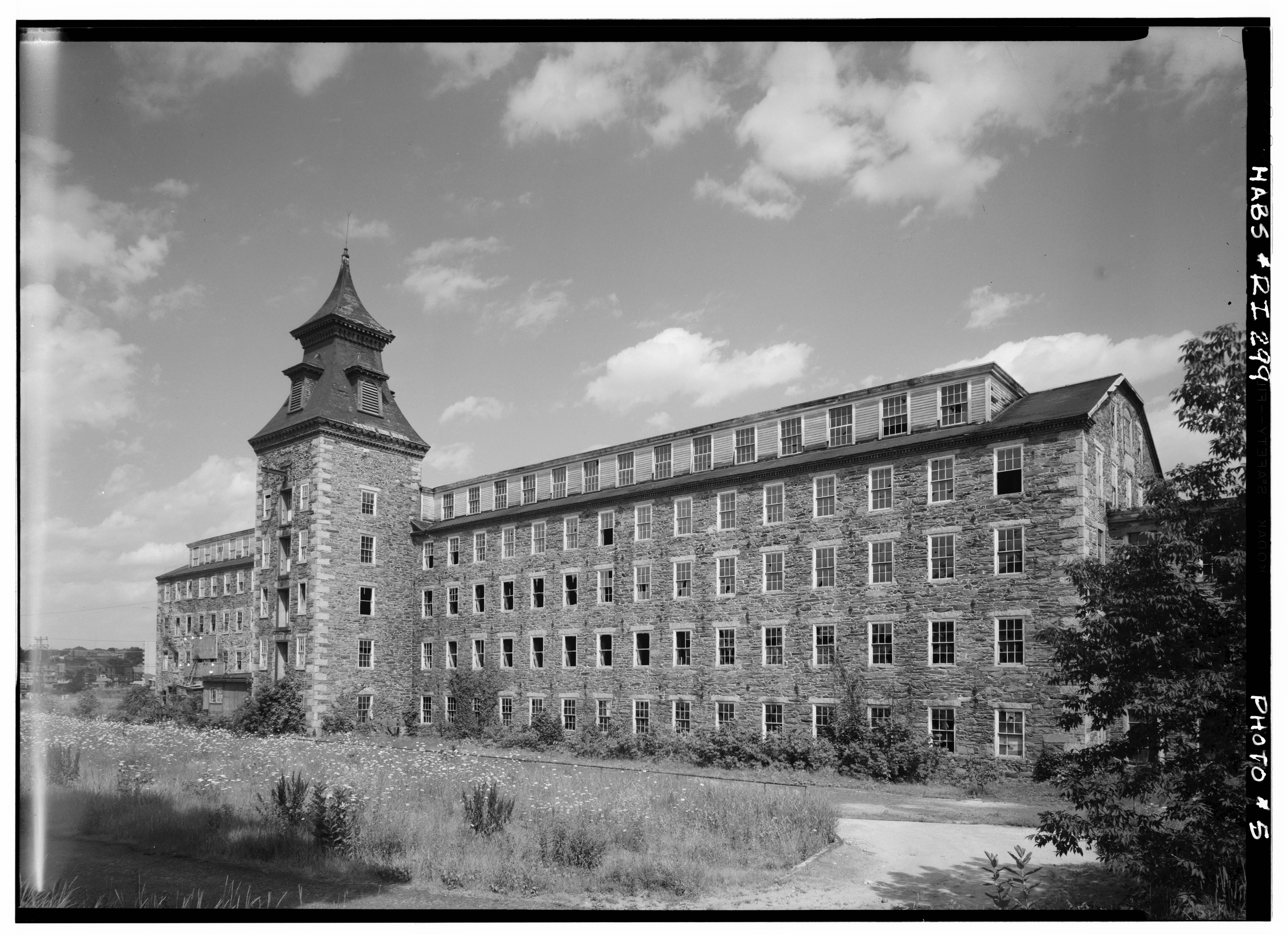
The Clinton Mill in Woonsocket, Rhode Island was one of many Rhode Island mills owned by the Knight brothers

In 1846 Knight was employed by John Hopkins Clarke as a clerk in his factory store at Arnold's Bridge, now Pontiac, Rhode Island. After Clark was elected to the U.S. Senate, Knight and a partner purchased the business and became owners of the Pontiac Mills. In 1852 Knight with his brother, Benjamin Knight formed B. B. and R. Knight a manufacturing and grain firm. Later along with other partners, they formed and purchased numerous manufacturing operations in New England. The brothers also became involved in the banking and insurance industries. The Knights built employee housing, mill villages, and donated funds to build various denominations of churches for the mill workers. In 1851 Knight formed Fruit of the Loom and trademarked the well known fruit trademark in the 1870s soon after the trademark registry was established. By his death in 1912, the New York Times listed Knight as the largest cotton manufacturer in the world.

The company purchased the Dedham Manufacturing Company on Mother Brook in Dedham, Massachusetts in 1877.

== Knight Memorial Library ==
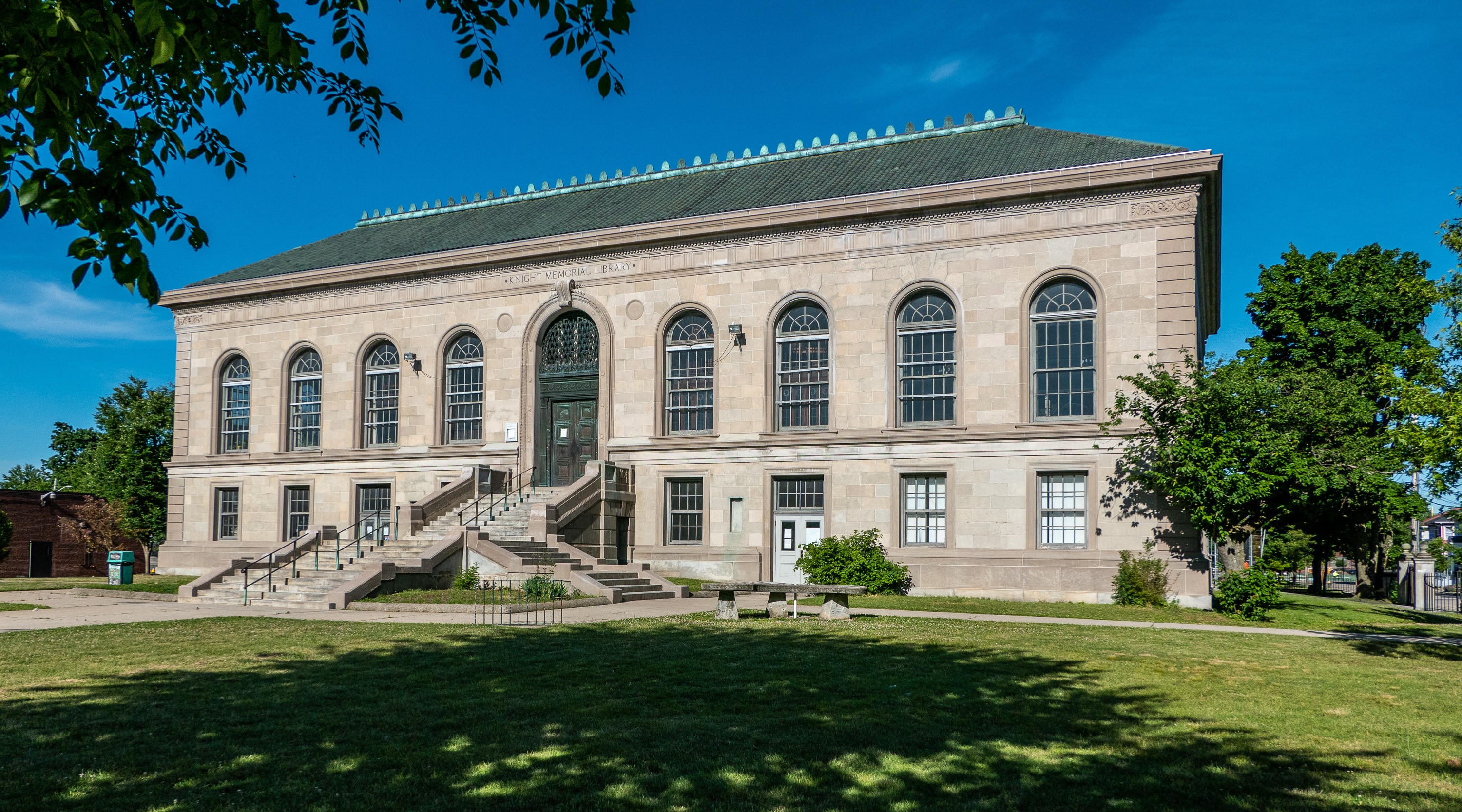
Knight Memorial Library

Knight lived with his wife Josephine and family in the Elmwood neighborhood of Providence, Rhode Island. In 1924, Knight's children financed the construction of a library on property belonging to his estate. The library was operated by the Elmwood Public Library Association, and the building maintained by the Knight family. In 1962, library management was turned over to the Providence Public Library, and in 2011 the building was transferred to the city.

Knight's Elmwood Avenue mansion was demolished in 1963.

== See also ==
- Fruit of the Loom
- Benjamin Knight
- Knight Estate
- River Point, Rhode Island
- Royal Mill Complex
- Lippitt Mill
- Pontiac Mills
- Valley Queen Mill
