= Charles Hawkins =

Charles Hawkins may refer to:

- Charles Hawkins (cricketer) (1817–1846), English cricketer
- Charles Edward Hawkins (1802–1837), Commander of the First Texas Navy during the Texan Revolution
- Charles G. Hawkins (1887–1958), Liberal party member of the Senate of Canada
- Charles R. Hawkins (born 1943), former American politician
- Charles Hawkins (Medal of Honor) (1834/1835–1908), American Navy seaman
