= Pontiac, Rhode Island =

Village in Rhode Island, United States

Coordinates: 41°44′N 71°29′W

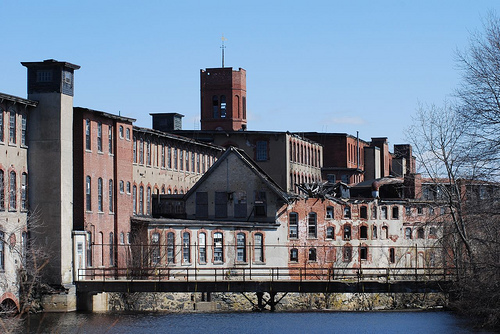
Pontiac Mills is listed on the National Register of Historic Places

Pontiac is a historic village in Warwick, Rhode Island, United States and part of the Pawtuxet River Valley.

== History ==
Native Americans referred to the area as "Papepieset" or "Toskiounke." After arriving in 1642, the early English settlers called the area "Great Weir" because fishing weirs were used to catch fish near the falls. After a bridge was constructed in the locality, the area became known as "the great bridge near the weir," and eventually " Capt. Benjamin Greene's bridge" then "Arnold's bridge." After Senator John Hopkins Clarke purchased the water rights, the region assumed the name of "Clarksville." After purchasing the area, the Pontiac Manufacturing Company named the area "Pontiac" after Chief Pontiac a Northwestern Indian chief. Allegedly, "Mr. Clark, while out in Michigan, saw the picture of the old chief, Pontiac, and on his return had it engraved, to be used as a label on his goods. The name gradually became attached to the village after he left, though many continued to call it " Arnold's Bridge." In 1863 Benjamin Knight and Robert Knight, two brothers, built the Pontiac Mills in the village.

== See also ==
- List of Registered Historic Places in Rhode Island
- New York, Providence and Boston Railroad, operated the Pontiac Branch Railroad to the village
- Pontiac Mills
- 1922 New England Textile Strike
