= Benjamin Knight =

American industrialist, philanthropist (1813–1898)

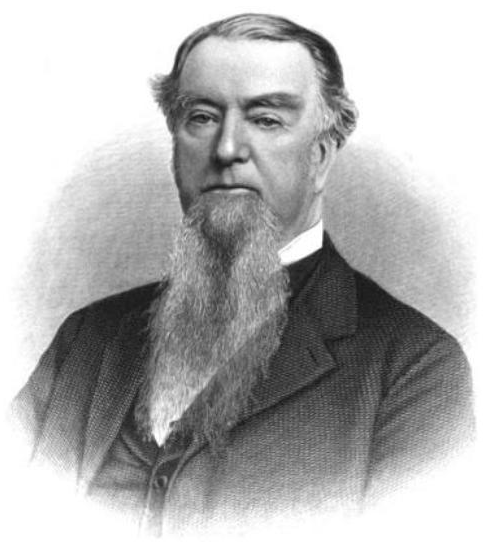
- Born: Benjamin Brayton Knight; October 3, 1813; Cranston, Rhode Island
- Died: June 4, 1898 (aged 84); Providence, Rhode Island
- Burial place: Swan Point Cemetery
- Spouses: Alice W. Collins (m. 1842; died 1850) Phebe A. Slocum (m. 1851)
- Children: 5
- Parents: Stephen Knight; Weltham Brayton
- Relatives: Sophia Amelia (sister); Jeremiah (brother); Mary Briggs (sister); Anna (sister); Elizabeth (sister); Robert (brother); Stephen Albert (brother); Dexter Newton (brother)

Signature
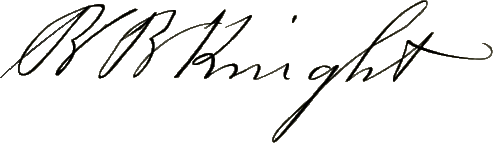

Benjamin Brayton Knight (1813–1898) was a New England industrialist and philanthropist, who was a partner with his brother Robert Knight in the B. B. & R. Knight Company and was one of the largest textile manufacturers in the world when he died in 1898. Knight co-founded the large and famous brand, Fruit of the Loom.

== Biography ==
He was born in Cranston, Rhode Island, on October 3, 1813, to Stephen Knight and Weltham Brayton. Knight worked on the family farm until he was 18 and went to work at Sprague Print Works in Cranston. In 1835, he opened a general grocery store near the print works before returning to farming.

In 1838, he moved to Providence, and founded Winsor, Knight & Company, a grocery business, with Onley Winsor and L. E. Bowen and eventually his brother, Jeremiah Knight, and the firm became B. B. Knight & Co. Knight later partnered with D. T. Penniman as Penniman, Knight & Company in the flour and grain trade in the Amasa Mason Block on Dyer Street Providence, Rhode Island. After buying out Penniman, Knight continued alone for about four years until 1849 when he sold his grocery business to Jeremiah. In 1852 Knight sold half of his flour and grain interest to Robert Knight, another brother. He then purchased from Robert a one-half interest in the Pontiac Mill and Bleachery, and the firm of B. B. and R. Knight was formed. The brothers later began to focus solely on the textile manufacturing. The company became the largest textile manufacturer in the world.

The company purchased the Dedham Manufacturing Company on Mother Brook in Dedham, Massachusetts in 1877.

Benjamin Knight also served as in several political offices, including as a member of the General Assembly and city alderman. Knight also became involved in various banking and insurance companies.

He married Alice W. Collins in 1842, and they had three children. She died on February 8, 1850, and he remarried to Phebe A. Slocum in December 1851. They had two children.

Benjamin Knight died in Providence on June 4, 1898. He was buried at Swan Point Cemetery.

== See also ==
- River Point, Rhode Island
- Royal Mill Complex
- Lippitt Mill
- Valley Queen Mill
