= 1922 New England Textile Strike =

Industry wide labor strike

New England Textile Strike of 1922
- Part of Labor unions
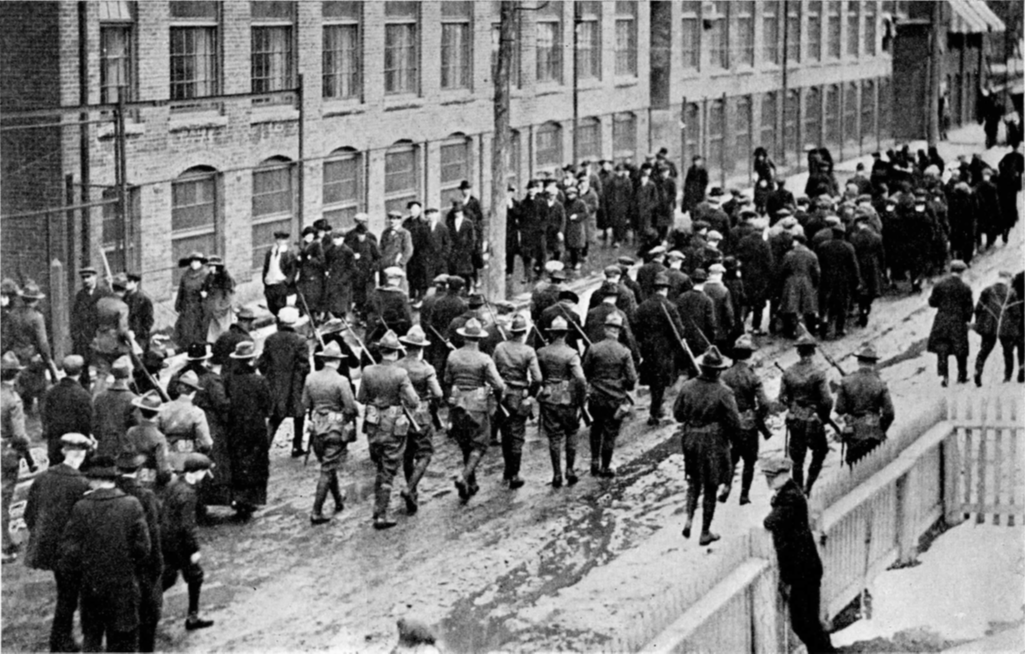
- Militia escorting strikebreakers in Pawtucket, R.I
- Date: January 23, 1922 – November 1922 (104 years ago)
- Location: New England, United States
- Caused by: 20% wage cut Increase in weekly hours
- Result: Reversal of 20% wage cut for most.

Parties
Textile workers; UTW, IWW, and ATW	Textile mill owners; Rhode Island State Guard

Lead figures
Ben Legere (IWW) Fred Harwood (ATW) Thomas F. McMahon (UTW)	William Madison Wood

Number
68,000–85,000	

Casualties and losses
At least 1 to 2 dead, 17 to 50 wounded	

The New England Textile Strike was a strike led by members of the United Textile Workers of America (UTW) principally in the U.S. states of Massachusetts, New Hampshire, and Rhode Island. Throughout the duration of the strike, an estimated 68,000–85,000 workers refused to work. Alongside the UTW, the IWW and ATW played major organizing roles within it, with the strike lasting for around 200 days at most mills.

The UTW and ATW led Rhode Island. The IWW, ATW, and UTW led Massachusetts. Lastly, the UTW completely led New Hampshire.

== Background ==
The strike has its beginnings fourteen months earlier. In December 1920, textile workers in New England accepted a 22.5% percent cut.

This cut in wages was most prominently done by The American Woolen Company, owned by William M. Wood, who announced this reduction across all 50 of the mills in the company in January, 1921. The American Woolen Company was one of the largest textile company within the continental US, controlling 20% of all woolen production in the country.

However, in January 1922 this was pushed further. New England mill owners demanded an additional 20% reduction in wages, while New Hampshire and Rhode Island (Note: In Massachusetts, the law already limited hours to a 48 hour workweek for women and children.) owners specifically attempted to restore the 54 hour week at the same time. This set off a wave of prolonged walkouts which would develop into the New England textile strike.

In Maine, textile workers did not strike, while in Massachusetts workers at a few of the mills decided to more thoroughly organize before striking. In Connecticut, for the two mills where the wage reduction was made, also did not strike. In addition to strikes by workers directly affected by the wage cuts, sympathy strikes also occurred throughout.

Many of the striking workers were not organized into a union before this. More than half of the strikers in Rhode Island did not belong to a union, while in Massachusetts and New Hampshire, three out of four did not have a union. The lack of wage reduction announcements in the highly organized textile cities of Fall River and New Bedford, Massachusetts, also encouraged workers to organize, in order to receive the same protections.

== Strike ==
On January 23, 1922, weavers at the Royal Mill in the Pawtuxet Valley of Rhode Island walked out, shutting down the mills. They then marched through Pawtucket, calling out workers at each mill, with many joining the strike. In the Blackstone Valley the United Textile Workers locals responded to the mill owners' announcements, calling a strike. The non-unionized workers of the Blackstone mills immediately joined after hearing about the UTW local's decision to strike.

By February, the mills of both the valleys were shut down, and the strike had spread to textile firms in Providence, Rhode Island, Lawrence, Massachusetts, and Manchester, New Hampshire. By February 14, 40,000 to 50,000 textile workers were on strike in New England.

The United Textile Workers (UTW) played a major within the broader strike(s), dispatching organizers to many mill towns, both to aid and to claim leadership over the strikes. However, their conservative approach remained criticized by the more radical workers and hindered effectiveness in some cases. During the strike, 18 injunctions were levied against strikers in an attempt to prevent picketing and striking.

By April 1922, according to a column released in the UTW's official magazine The Textile Worker, 85,000 textile workers were out on strike, with 8,000 out in Pawtuxet Mills, 15,000 in Blackstone Valley, 33,000 in New Hampshire mills, 13,000 at Lawrence Mills and 16,000 in the other New England towns.

Strike areas
Rhode Island	Blackstone Valley (Note: Including Central Falls and Cumberland (Berkeley Mill Village, Ashton, Lonsdale))	Pawtucket	Pawtuxet Valley (Note: Including West Warwick (Crompton, River Point, Pontiac, Apponaug, Buttonwoods, Arctic, Phenix, Natick), Harris, and Arkwright)	Providence			
Massachusetts	Lawrence	Lowell	South Attleboro	Methuen	Fitchburg	Ware	
New Hampshire	Manchester	Suncook	Somersworth	Dover	Nashua	Newmarket	Exeter

=== Rhode Island ===
The strike began at the Royal Mill, West Warwick in the Pawtuxet Valley and spread quickly. With the Blackstone Valley quickly following. In the first day, at least 18 plants had gone on strike, by the sixth day 25 plants had closed.

==== Pawtuxet Valley ====
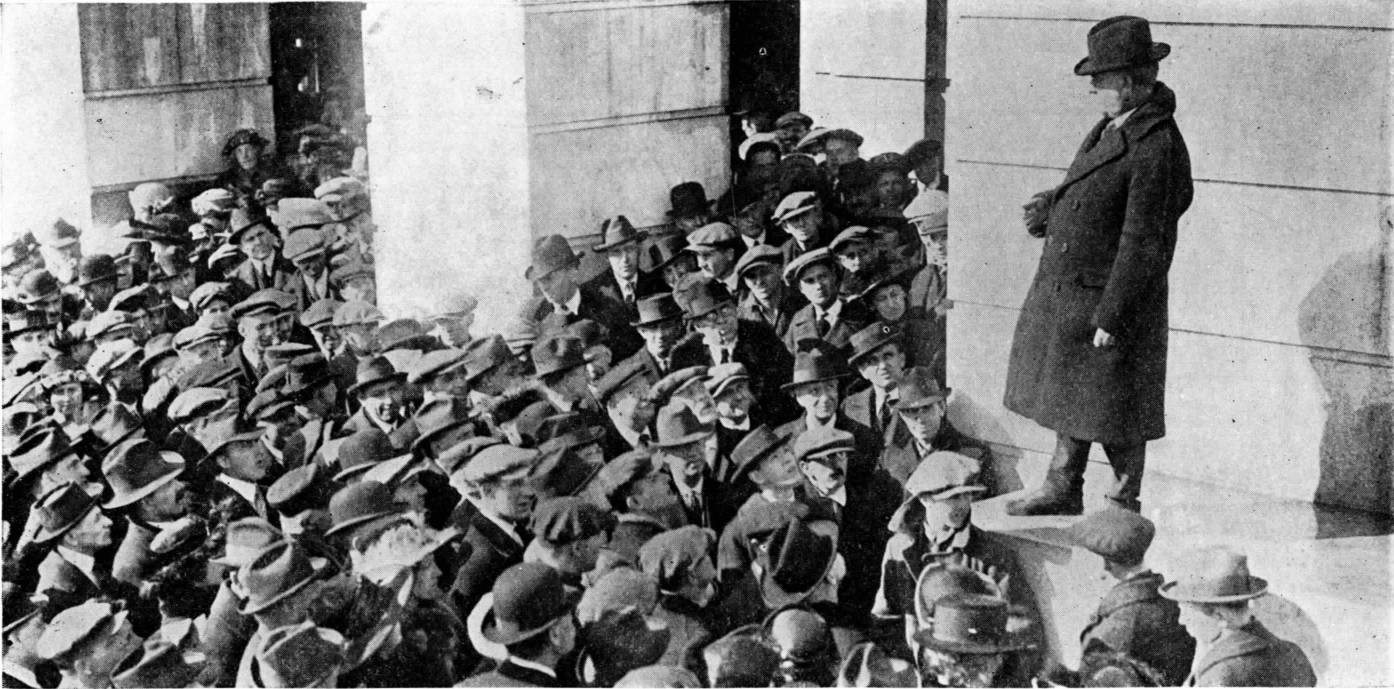
UTW President Thomas F. McMahon addressing textile strikers on capitol steps of Providence, circa March 9, 1922

On April 29, Deputy Sheriffs began serving eviction notices to the families of strikers that occupied company houses within the Pawtuxet Valley. This included the Interlaken Mills in Arkwright and Harris, and the Hope Company Mills in Hope and Phenix.

==== Pawtucket and shooting ====
On the morning of February 21, in Pawtucket, police shot into a crowd of a 1,000 people who had gathered at the plant of the Jenckes Spinning Company. Juan D'Assumpcau, (Note: Incorrectly referred to as Joseph Assuncao in some sources) a nearby grocer clerk, was killed by police fire, and ended up being shot in the backside seven times. 17 others ended up wounded, some from earlier police beatings, and eight from the shots.

A local newspaper from the time gives a higher number of casualties, with two men killed and 50 wounded, ten severely. Another source from the time also claims two people were killed.

Reportedly before the shooting, Pawtucket Mayor Robert A. Kenyon at the plant read the Riot Act out loud. He then told the patrolmen to be careful but to do their duty and to "shoot if necessary". Another account claims Mayor Kenyon fired their pistol up into the air shortly before the shooting occurred.

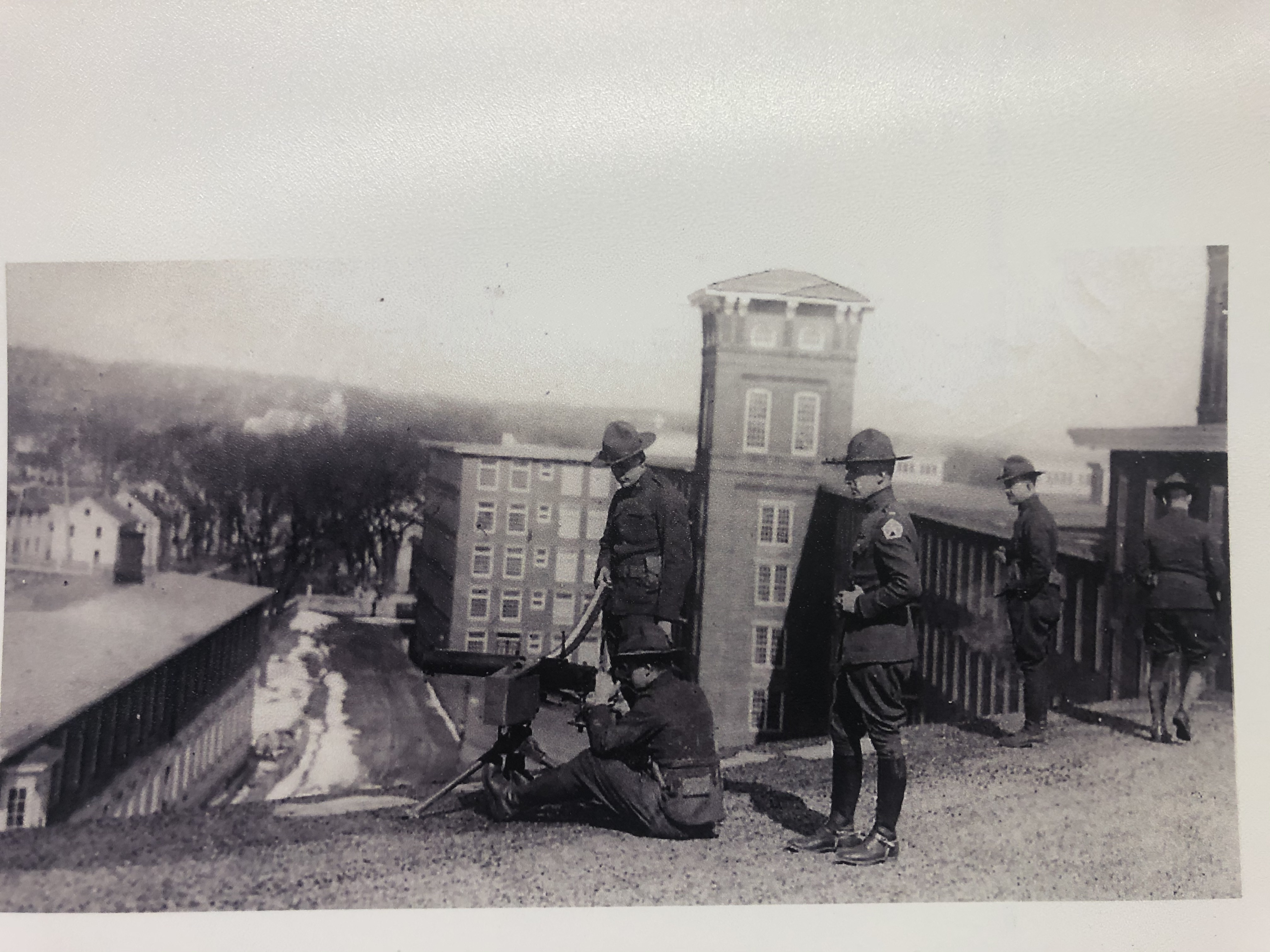
Machine gun on roof of Natick Mill.

On February 23, 5,000–7,000 marched in the funeral procession.

Historical Footage
- Natick Textile Strike (1922)

Following the event, militia (Note: The Cavalry Coast Artillery, the Field Artillery, and the Sanitary Troop of Rhode Island. 49 officers and 912 men.) were called in by Rhode Island governor Emery J. San Souci, with machine guns mounted to the roofs of Pontiac Mill and nearby Natick Mill. They were used to escort strikebreakers. Some were stationed at Pawtucket, while the others were stationed at Crompton, part of the Pawtuxet River Valley.

Later, one silk weaving mill not affected by a wage cut, joined the strike in response to militia soldiers parading around in the mill they worked at.

On June 5, Pontiac Mills started evicting 150 people, 50 families from their mill-owned homes. Latter that afternoon, Rhode Island Judge Justice Tanner issued a restraining order not allowing the eviction of tenants in either Pontiac or Natick. However, It's unclear whether or not this was enforced, with two families in Pontiac and five in Natick already evicted.

=== Massachusetts ===
==== Lowell ====
On February 13, the strike began in Massachusetts starting from two manufacturing mills in Lowell. On July 10, another Lowell Mill joined the strike, and another on July 17.

==== Fitchburg ====
In Fitchburg, 2,400 people worked in cotton textile mills, but only 300 were organized with the ATW. Workers there voted to delay the strike to ally with and organize the other workers not a part of the union. By March 1, now with 900 ATW members, they called the strike.

==== Lawrence ====
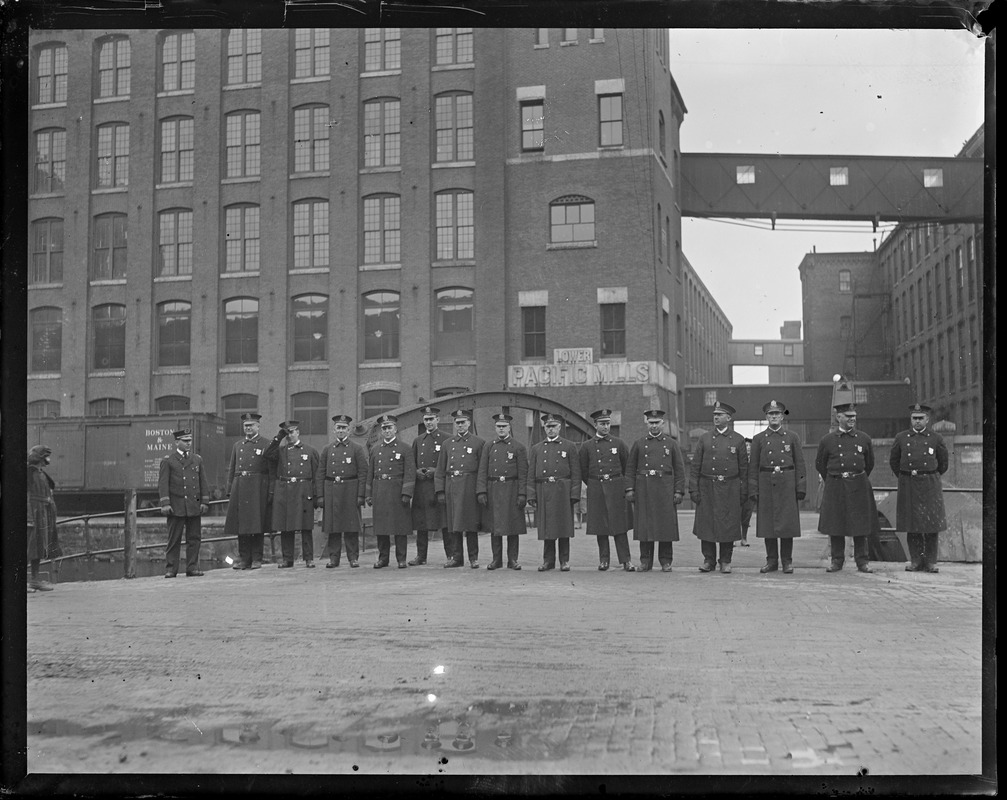
Police guard lower Pacific Mills.

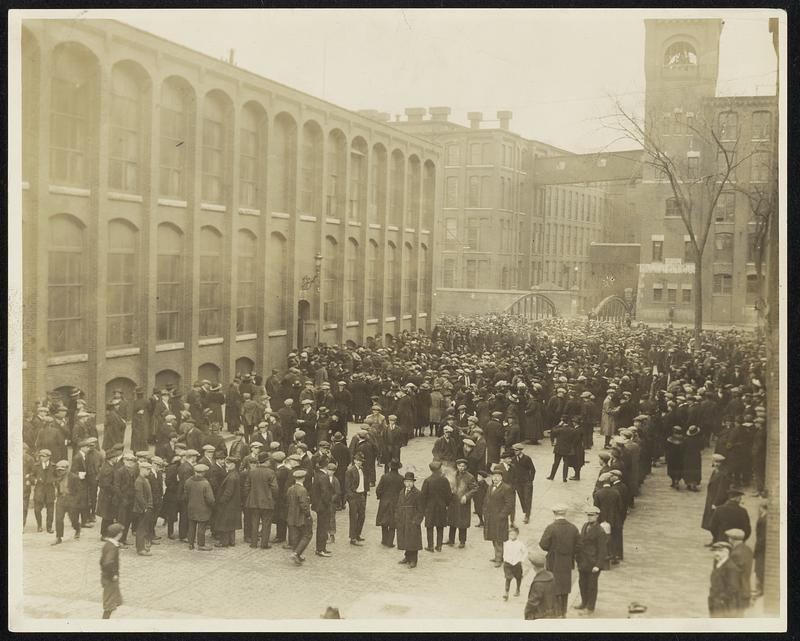
Strikers outside lower Pacific Mills

Lawrence, Massachusetts

On March 27, striking started in Lawrence at seven mills.

The organizing at the mills was contested. As the UTW refused to cooperate with other unions, so the I.W.W. held elections in Lawrence for a fifty-member strike committee.

The I.W.W. played a crucial role in the organizing within Lawrence, mobilizing the mass meetings, rallies, and pickets. The UTW's refusal to cooperate with other unions (I.W.W., Mulespinners, AFL Loomfixer's) weakened the Lawrence mill's strike. At the time Ben Legere, an I.W.W. leader, had proposed a joint strike committee with representatives from each striking union, which the UTW officials refused.

Outside Lawrence, the UTW and ATW broadly and successfully cooperated with each other in organizing the textile mills and supporting the broad strike.

Late in August, it was announced that wages would be restored to their previous levels before the reduction, with back pay, at the Lawrence mills. This was the first break of mill owners, to concede to reversing the wage cut, which caused many other mills to follow suit.

==== Methuen ====
At Methuen, two mills went on strike.

=== New Hampshire ===
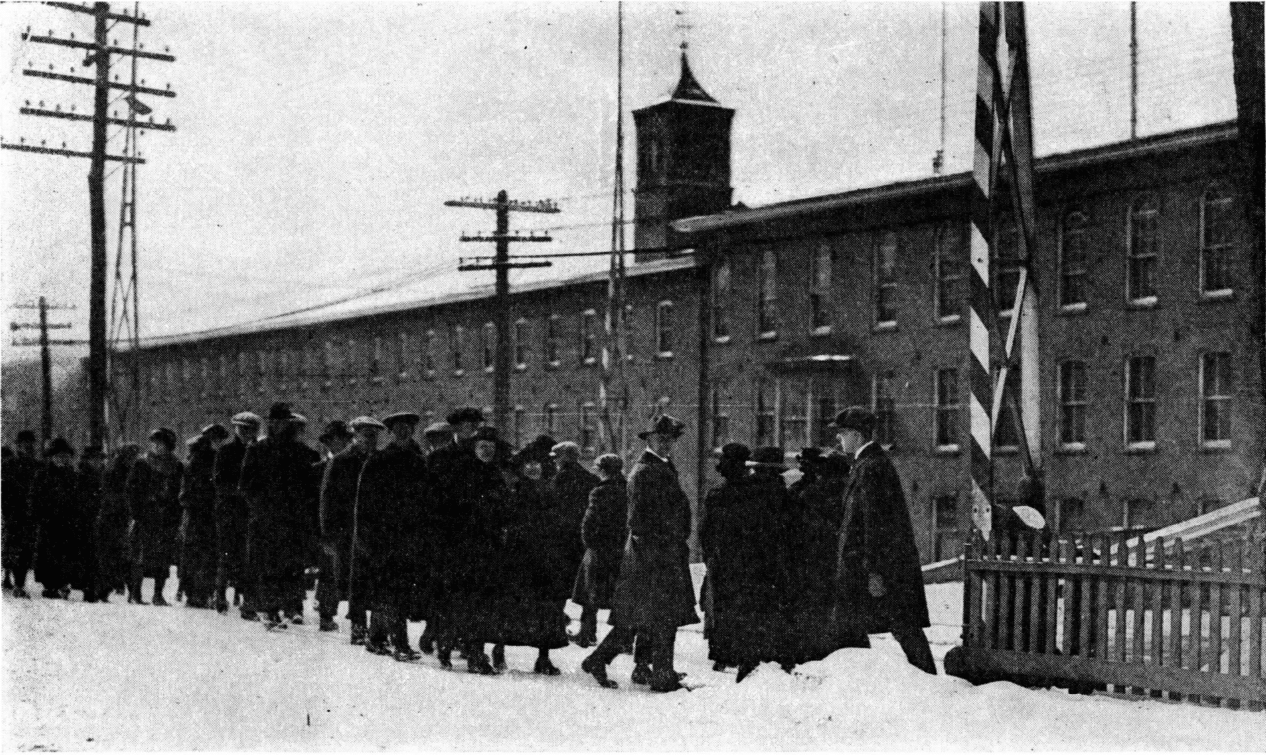
Mid-winter picket line in front of Amoskeag Mill,
Published March 1922

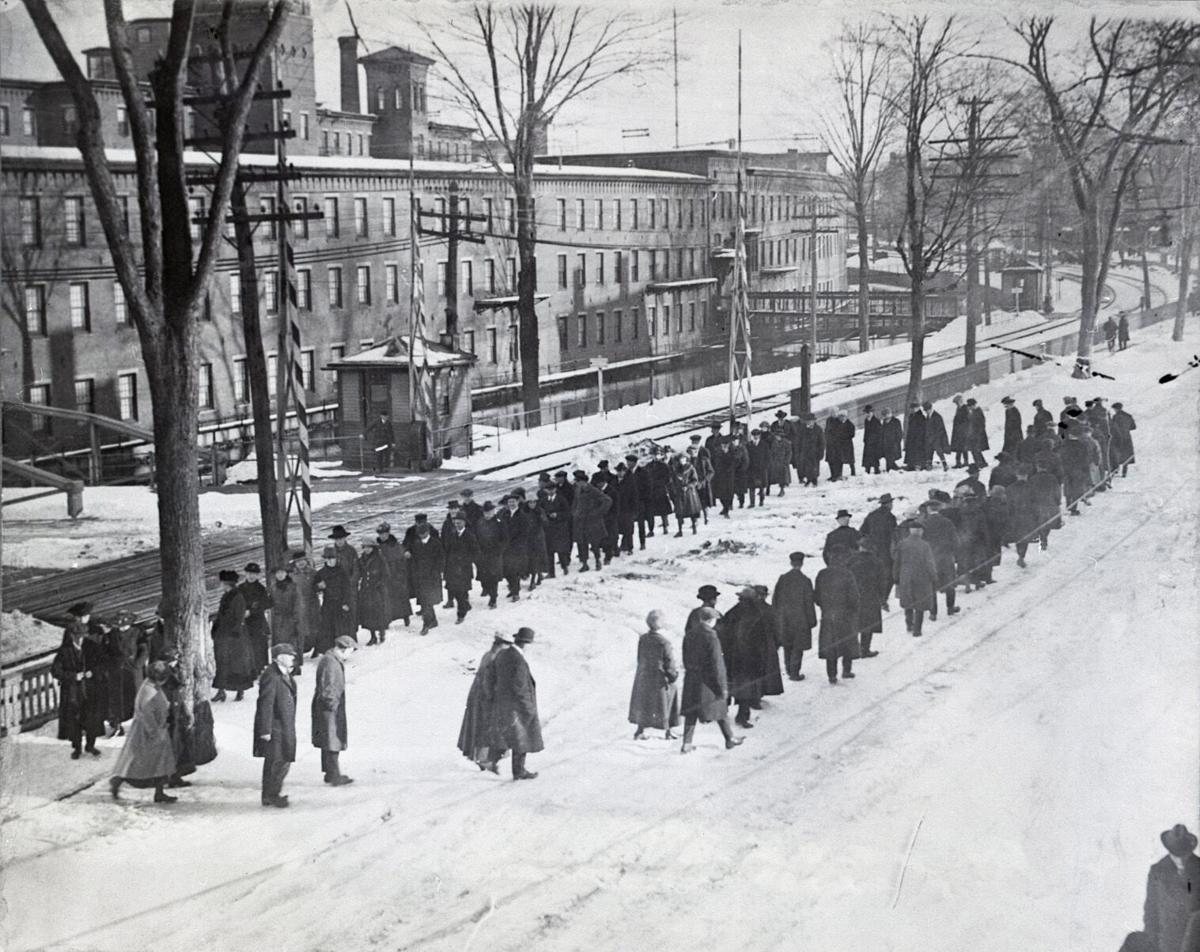
Weavers picketing at Amoskeag mill entrance - March 13, 1922.

On February 2, 1922, Amoskeag Mills announced all departments would receive a pay reduction of 20 percent, with hours increased from 48 to 54 hours per week. With support from the UTW, millworkers decided to strike when the change went into effect on February 13.

On February 13, 14 mills struck with all but three having to close during the strike.

==== Manchester ====
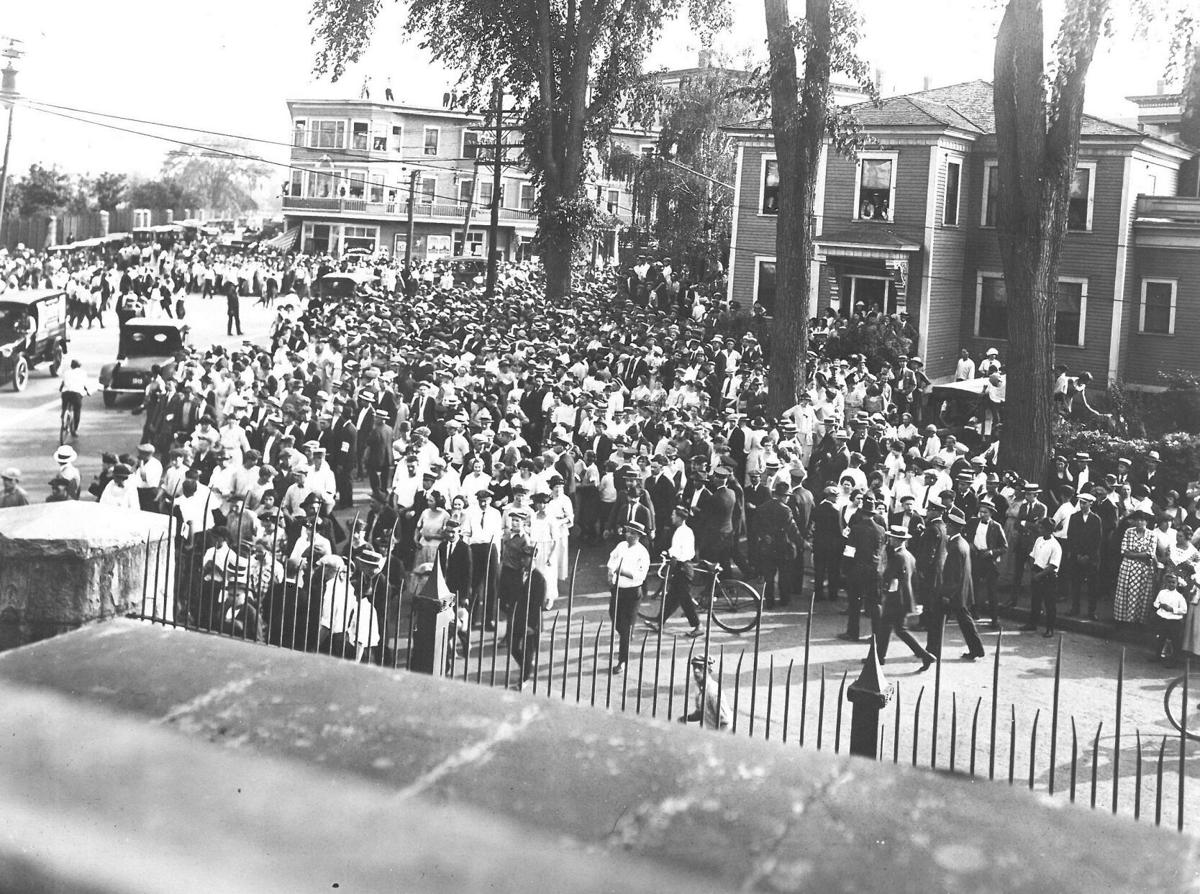
A large crowd in Jutras Square jeering at company operatives leaving Amoskeag's Coolidge Mill.- June 7, 1922

On April 10, several thousand strikers marched in the streets of Manchester. The parade was voted on by its members the night before, during which they also voted to continue striking. The intent of the parade was to be a demonstration of the strike's strength. Strikers carried slogans emphasizing the 48 hour week.

In August, Amoskeag restored the pre-strike wage scale. However, workers continued to strike for a return to the 48-hour week, as well as assurances that strike leaders would not be blacklisted.

On November 26, strikers returned to work with their demands partially unmet. But some hoped that the state House of Representatives—controlled by Democrats for the first time since 1914—would consider enacting a 48-hour law. However, the Republican-controlled Senate defeated the bill.

== See also ==
- Great Railroad Strike of 1922
- UMW General coal strike (1922)
- US Textile Workers' Strike of 1934
