= St. Mary's Church and Cemetery =

St. Mary's Church and Cemetery may refer to:

in the United States

- St. Mary's Episcopal Church (Newton Lower Falls, Massachusetts), listed on the NRHP as St. Mary's Church and Cemetery
- St. Mary's Church and Cemetery (Crompton, Rhode Island), listed on the NRHP in Rhode Island
