= Royal Mill Complex =

- U.S. National Register of Historic Places
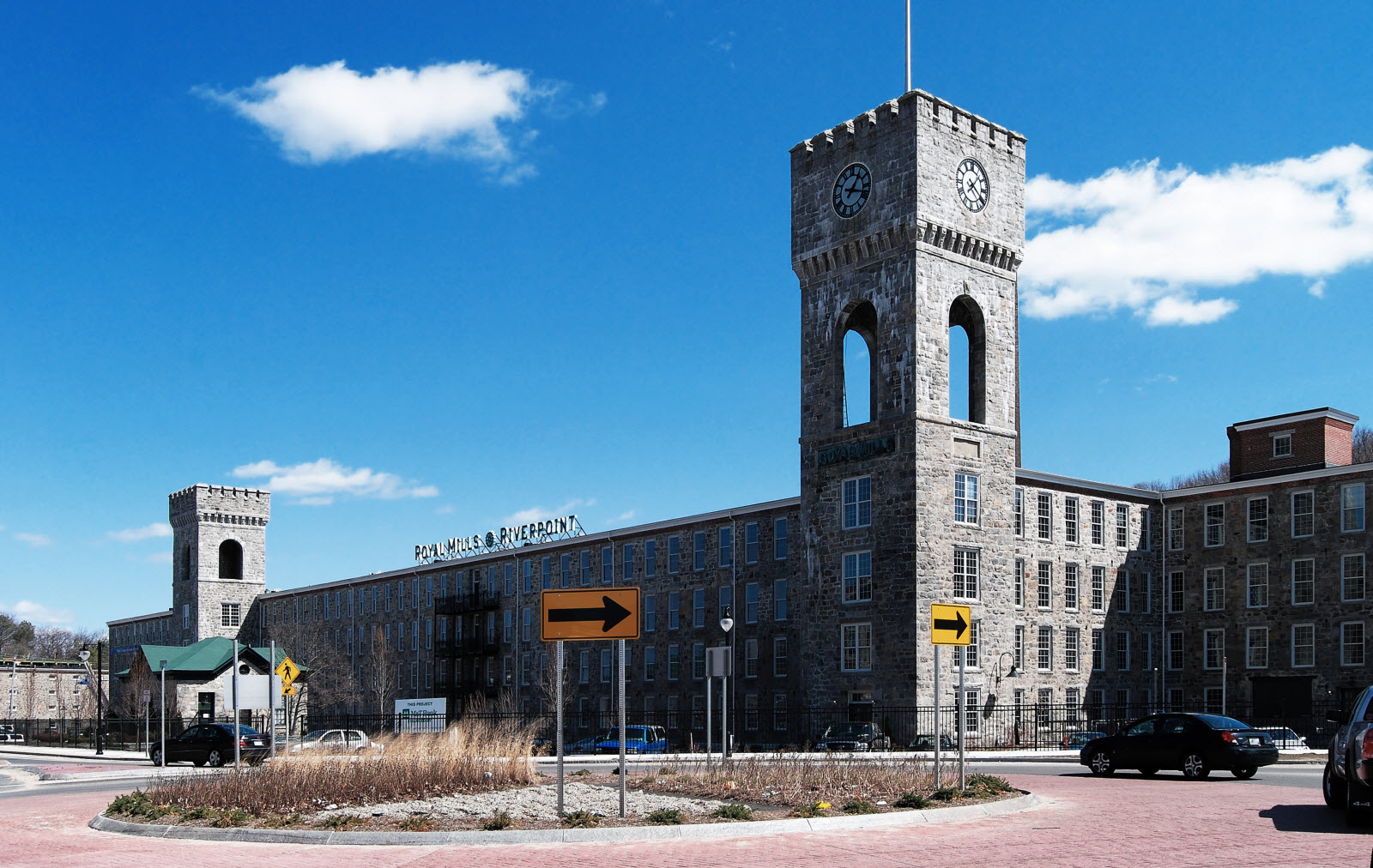
- Royal Mills Apartments

- Location within Rhode Island Location within the United States
- Location: West Warwick, Rhode Island
- Coordinates: 41.71386°N 71.51604°W
- Area: 14 acres (5.7 ha)
- Built: 1890, rebuilt 1920
- Engineer: David M. Thompson (1890)
- Architectural style: Late 19th And 20th Century Revivals
- NRHP reference No.: 04000377
- Added to NRHP: April 29, 2004

The Royal Mill Complex is an historic textile mill site at 125 Providence Street in West Warwick, Rhode Island. The mill complex was listed on the National Register of Historic Places in 2004. It has recently been completely renovated and remodeled into 250 residential apartments. The complex also includes the Ace Dye Works mill on the south side of the river, which has been converted into lofts. A pedestrian skybridge connects the two mills.

== Site history ==
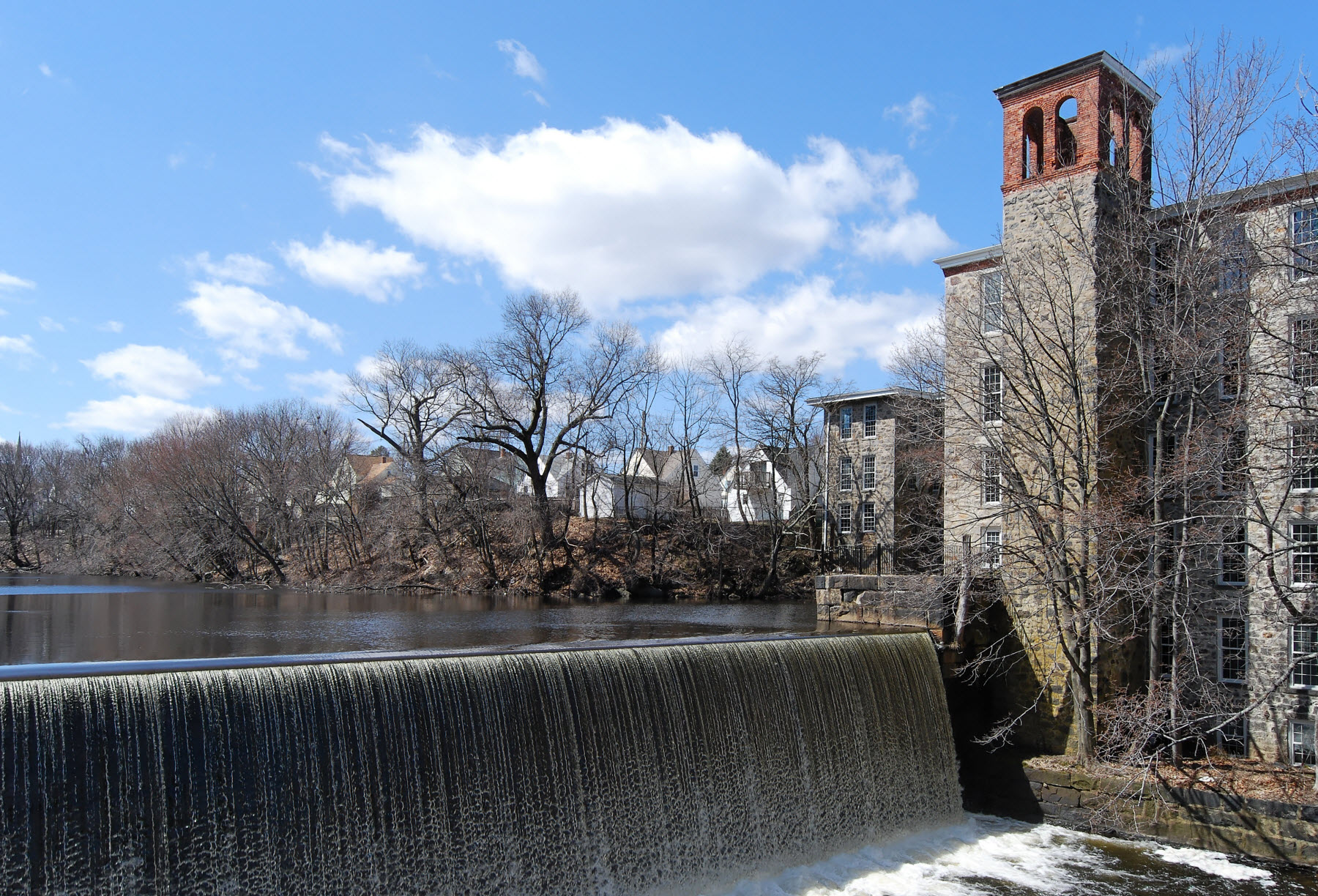
Royal Mills and dam

The complex is located along the banks of the South Branch of the Pawtuxet River in the village of River Point.

The site was first used for industrial purposes by the Greene Manufacturing Company, which built a wooden structure in 1809 and two later stone mills. In 1885, the site was purchased by B.B.& R. Knight Co., one of the largest textile companies in Rhode Island at the time, who marketed their cloth under the Fruit of the Loom label. In 1890, the Knight Company razed the three old mills and built the Royal Mill from local granite. The building was designed by mill engineer David M. Thompson. The new mill would become one of the largest in the company's empire of 22 mills throughout the region.

In 1919, the Royal Mill was destroyed by fire. It was rebuilt a year later in the current configuration, with twin stone towers. In 1921, the Royal Mill was the scene of a huge textile worker strike that lasted 33 weeks. The impact of the strike as well as increased competition from Southern mills led to many mill closures throughout New England during the 1920s. The Royal Mill survived until 1935, when the once mighty B.B.& R. Knight Co. went bankrupt.

Between 1936 and 1946 the site was occupied by Saybrooke Manufacturing Co., which produced wool cloth. After this time, and until 2004 the mill was used by a variety of small companies.

The mill was abandoned and taken over by the town of West Warwick, Rhode Island in 1993, and there was serious consideration for demolishing the structure.

== Conversion ==
In 2004, the Royal Mill was purchased by Struever Bros. Eccles & Rouse, which began a complete renovation of the site, including the adjacent stone dam, now used to produce hydropower. The Royal Mill now contains 250 apartments, and is the focal point of a revitalized riverfront that contains a public walking path along the river.

== See also ==
- National Register of Historic Places listings in Kent County, Rhode Island
- River Point, Rhode Island
- Benjamin Knight
- Mill conversion
