= Crompton (West Warwick) =

Town in West Warwick

Coordinates: 41°41′05″N 71°30′49″W

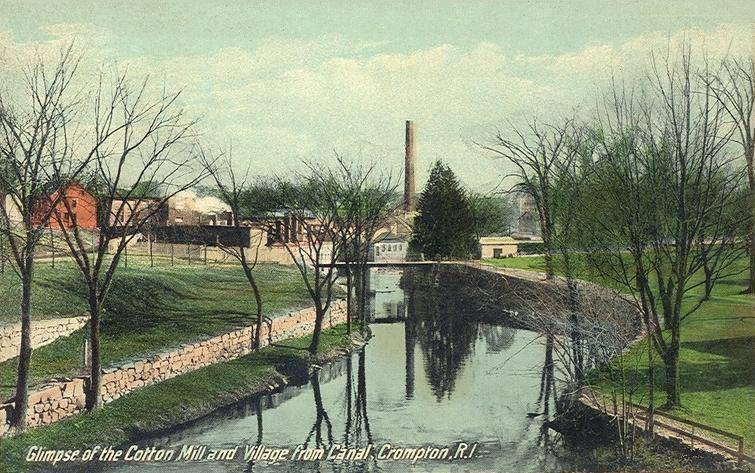
Cotton mill and village in 1917

Crompton is a community in West Warwick, Rhode Island, United States. It is named after Samuel Crompton, inventor of the spinning mule.

The Crompton Mill was set up in 1807, on the east bank of the Pawtuxet River, and is thought to be the first stone mill built in Rhode Island. The original structure still stands on the original site, although extensive modifications to add a further two stories by 1881 were carried out, allowing for the production of corduroy and print cloth at the site.

Crompton is home to Old St. Mary Church, the oldest Roman Catholic church building in the state of Rhode Island, built in 1844.

== See also ==
- 1922 New England Textile Strike

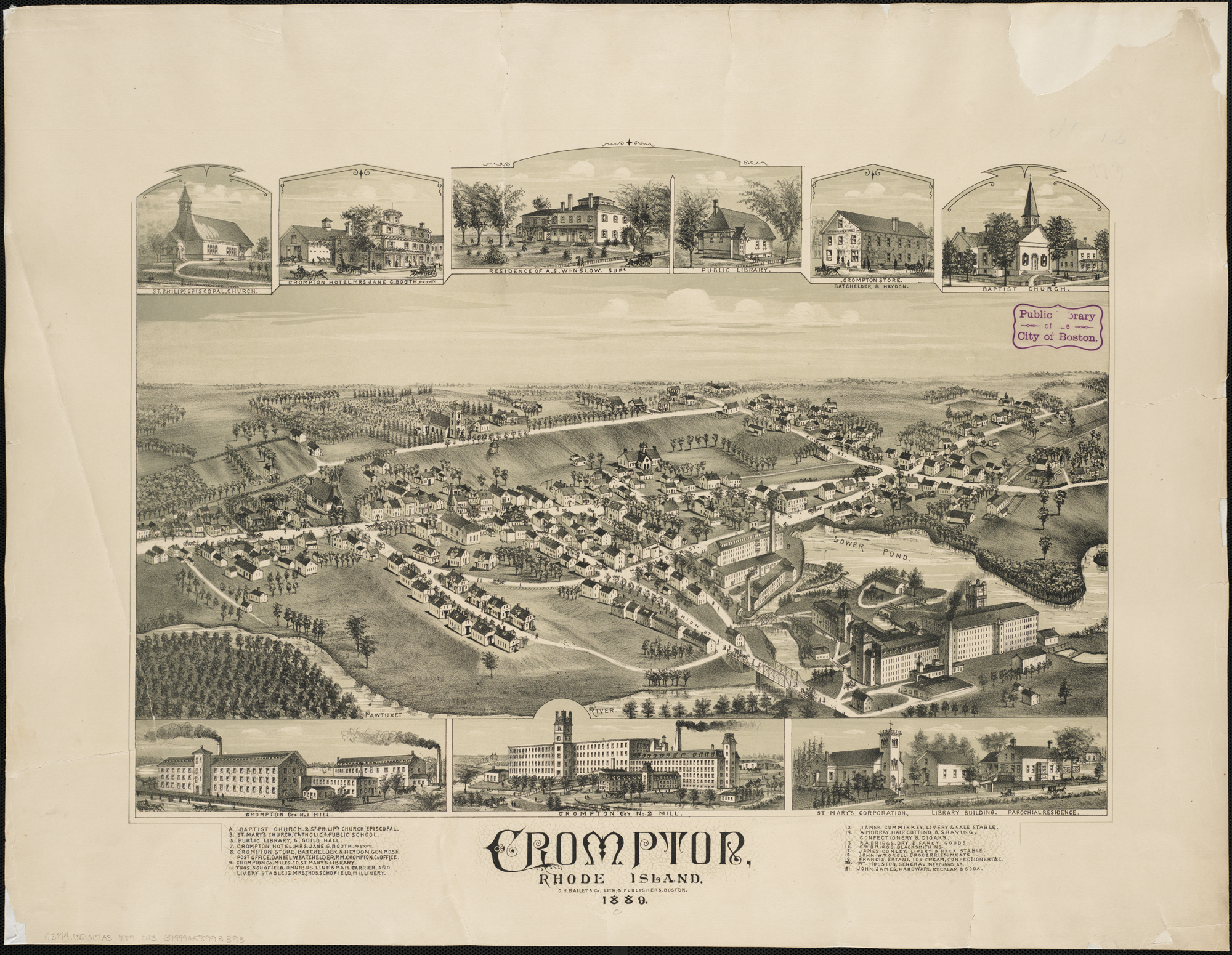
Panoramic map of Crompton from 1889 with a host of landmarks and inset images of some
