= St. Mary's Church and Cemetery (Crompton, Rhode Island) =

Historic church and cemetery in Kent County, Rhode Island, US

- U.S. National Register of Historic Places
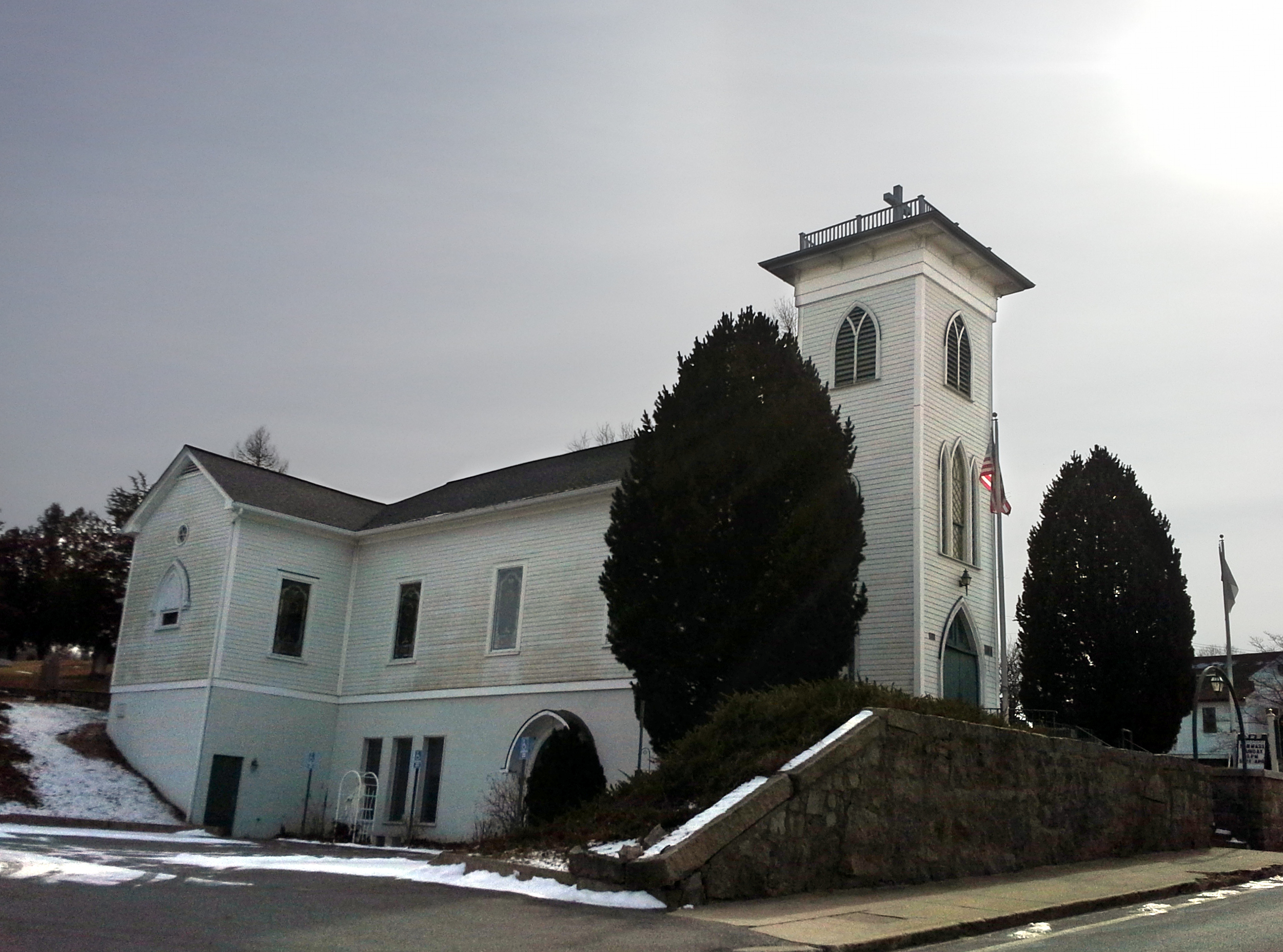

- Location within Rhode Island Location within the United States
- Location: Church Street, West Warwick, Rhode Island
- Coordinates: 41°41′12″N 71°31′08″W
- Built: 1844
- Architectural style: Gothic, Celtic
- Website: https://stmaryswestwarwick.org
- NRHP reference No.: 78000065
- Added to NRHP: November 21, 1978

St. Mary's Church and Cemetery is a historic Roman Catholic church building and cemetery in Crompton, a village of West Warwick, Rhode Island.

== Description ==
The neo-Gothic building was constructed in 1844. The building is the oldest Catholic church still in use in the Roman Catholic Diocese of Providence. The church building was added to the National Register of Historic Places in 1978.

Notable burials include Civil War Medal of Honor recipient Charles Hawkins (1834/35–1908), Pro-football player Frank Maznicki (1920–2013), and MLB player Mike Roarke (1930–2019).

== See also ==
- Catholic Church in the United States
- Catholic parish church
- Index of Catholic Church articles
- National Register of Historic Places listings in Kent County, Rhode Island
- Pastoral care
