= Jenckes Spinning Company =

- U.S. National Register of Historic Places
- U.S. Historic district
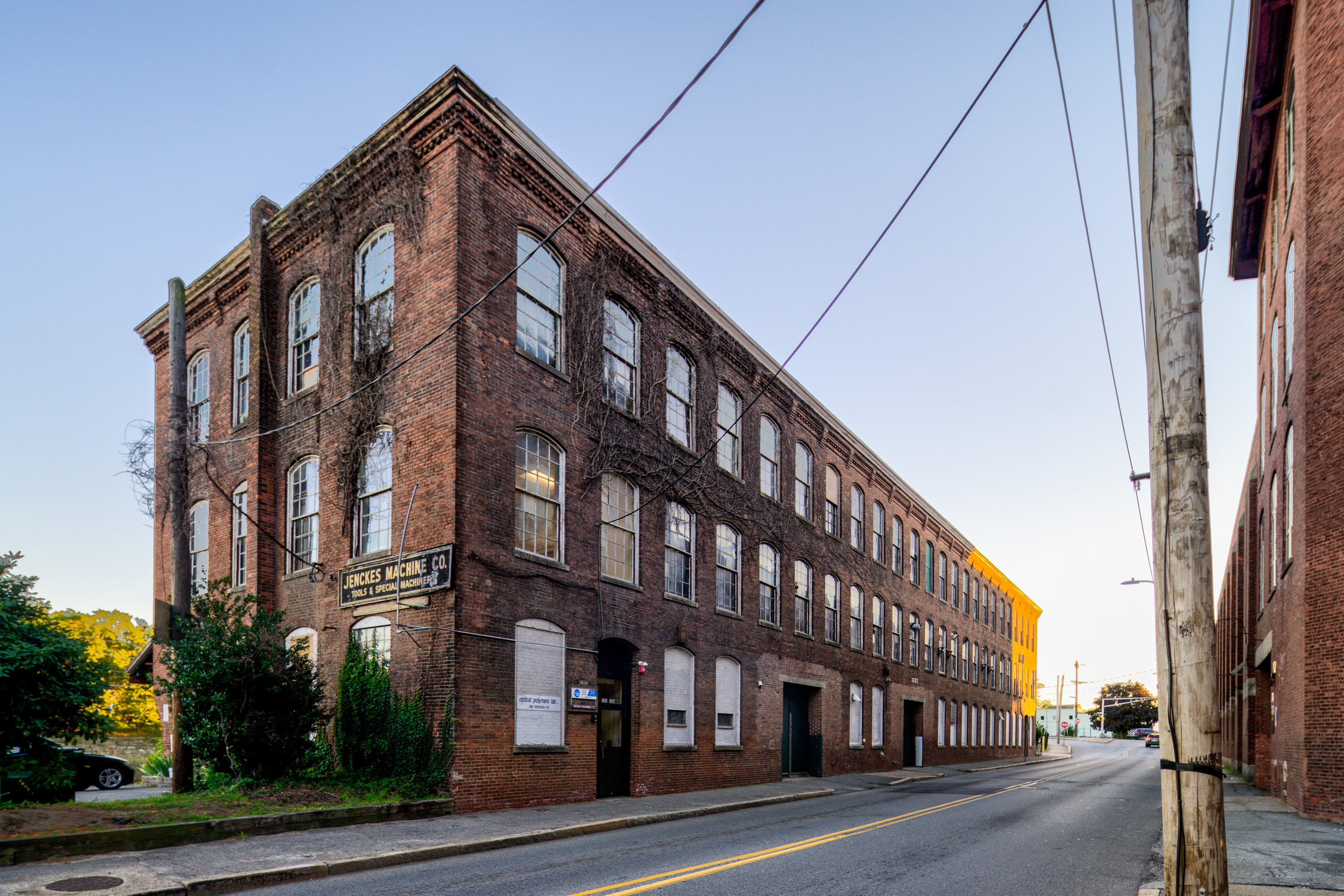

- Location within Rhode Island Location within the United States
- Location: Weeden, Barton, Pine, Lily Pond & Conant Sts., Pawtucket, Rhode Island
- Coordinates: 41°52′43″N 71°23′35″W
- Area: 8 acres (3.2 ha)
- Built: 1883
- NRHP reference No.: 100002059
- Added to NRHP: January 25, 2018

The Jenckes Spinning Company is a historic textile factory complex in Pawtucket, Rhode Island. Located on Conant and Weeden Streets, the complex was developed between 1883 and 1919, and was home to the city's largest employer in the 1910s, producing cotton fabric and fabric for use in automotive tires until 1933. The factory complex was listed on the National Register of Historic Places in 2018.

== Description and history ==
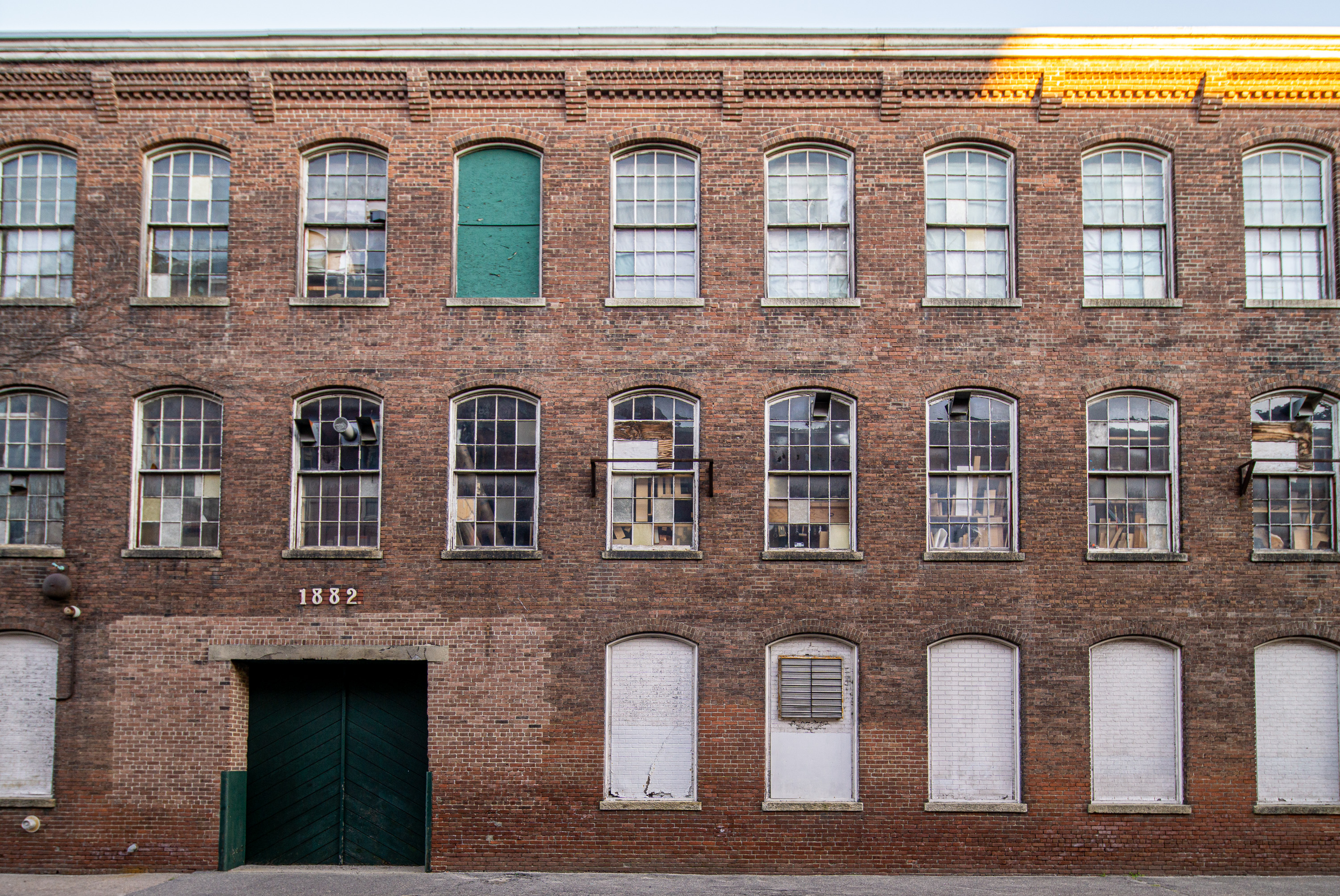
Jenckes Spinning Company windows

The Jenckes Spinning Company factory is located about 0.5 miles (0.80 km) west of downtown Pawtucket, on 8 acres (3.2 ha) in the shape of a rectangle with one corner cut off. It is bounded by Conant, Pine, and Weeden Streets, and includes nine buildings, seven of which are historically significant. All are of brick construction typical of late 19th and early 20th century textile mills, and range in height from one to six stories. Notable architectural features include the sawtooth roof on the facility's former weaving sheds, which front on Weeden Street.

In 1872, Edwin Jenckes, by then a successful supplier of equipment to textile manufacturers in Walpole, Massachusetts and Pawtucket, established a company with textile maker Nathaniel Hicks, as a vehicle for the manufacture of patented ring travellers. In 1883, the company took on the name "E. Jenckes Manufacturing Company", and acquired a portion of the land now making up the plant. The company's earliest buildings were built that year, but were demolished in 1915-16. The company was successful in manufacturing textile-making equipment, and soon expanded into textile production itself. In the 1910s, the company developed a heavy cotton duck fabric that could be dipped in rubber for use in automotive applications. The company was closed down in the 1930s after a series of acquisitions, and the property was purchased by the city and subdivided for other uses.

== See also ==
- 1922 New England Textile Strike § Jenckes Spinning Company killing
- National Register of Historic Places listings in Pawtucket, Rhode Island
