= Exquisite Form =

American clothing brand

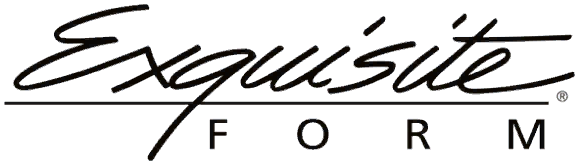
- Product type: Lingerie, undergarment
- Current owner: Fruit of the Loom (Berkshire Hathaway)
- Country: U.S.
- Introduced: 1945; 81 years ago
- Markets: Worldwide
- Previous owners: Exquisite Form Industries; Bestform Group; VF Corporation
- Tagline: "Trusted by real women since 1945"
- Website: exquisiteform.com

Exquisite Form is an American clothing brand for women's intimates, particularly bras and shapewear for full-figured women. The brand is owned by Vanity Fair Brands, a division of Fruit of the Loom.

The brand began in 1945 with the founding of Exquisite Form Industries Inc. in New York City. Its principal products at the time were brassieres, garter belts and girdles.

== History ==
The company was founded in 1945 in New York City. It was founded with the help of its head designer Lillian Hunau, who also had a special wiring and bust shaping patent which began featuring in bras the following year. 1945 was also the year Exquisite Form became one of the first major brassiere companies to advertise in Ebony Magazine.

With the growth in business came growth in marketing. By the end of the 1950s, Exquisite Form's advertising budget grew to over $2 million for television advertising. By 1959, the company was doing product placement in movies with a multimillion-dollar campaign for the movie Happy Anniversary.

Rudi Gernreich and the "No Bra"

Austrian-born American fashion designer Rudi Gernreich preferred that his designs should be worn braless. In October 1964, Gernreich collaborated with Exquisite Form to create "No Bra". The bra was made of sheer fabric without underwires or lining of any kind. Unlike contemporary bras, his design allowed breasts to assume their natural shape, rather than being molded into an aesthetic ideal.

It was a soft-cup, light-weight, seamless, sheer nylon tricot and elastic bra only available for small-breasted women. It came in three sheer colors: powder puff, black, and white, and in sizes 32 to 36, A and B cups. It had a single hook in the back.

The No Bra was a big departure from the sculpted, bullet-shaped bosom of the previous decade. It was quite similar to the original bra of the 1920s and like the first modern bra invented by Mary Phelps Jacob, two handkerchiefs attached to a band and tied around the chest. Gernreich's no-bra was little more than that. Both the 1920s and the 1960s celebrated the stick-like figure of adolescence, and with that meant small, flat breasts.

His minimalist bra revolutionized brassiere design, initiating a trend toward more natural shapes and soft, sheer fabrics.

The retail success of the No Bra was followed in 1965 with the next design, a "no-side" bra to accommodate dresses with deep armholes. It had a narrow stretch band around the torso that allowed women to wear open-sleeved garments without displaying a bra band. The sheer cups were cut part of the bias and part of the half-bias. He also produced a "No Front" maillot design with a deep, plunging front for slit-to-the-waist necklines, and a "No-Back" long-line version that was anchored using contoured stretch-waistband that allowed a woman to wear a backless dress.

Fully Product Line

In 1970, Exquisite Form registered and launched their trademark "Fully" line of bras, focusing the brand on more full-figured products.

== Acquisitions ==
Bestform Group

In 1996, following bankruptcy of Exquisite Form Industries, the Bestform Group purchased the Exquisite Form label.

VF Corporation

In 1998, VF corporation bought the Bestform Group, including the Bestform, Exquisite From and Lily of France brands. This bolstered their portfolio of intimates brands that, at the time, consisted of only Vanity Fair and Vassarette.

Fruit of the Loom

In 2007, in a cash deal valued at $350 million, Fruit of the Loom purchased the entire Vanity Fair Brands intimate apparel division from VF Corporation.

== See also ==
- Bras N Things
