= River Point, Rhode Island =

United States historic community

Coordinates: 41°43′01″N 71°31′02″W

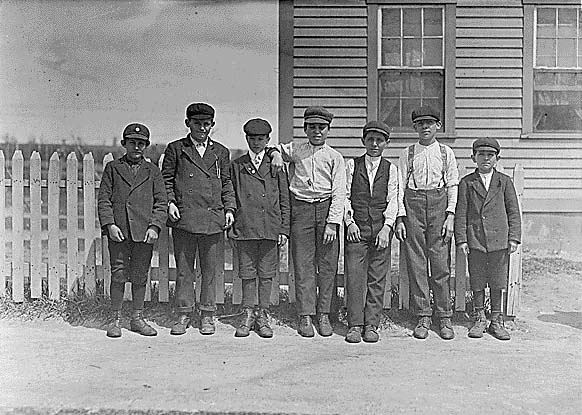
Some of the sweepers and mule room boys working in Valley Queen Mill. April 1909. Photographed by Lewis Hine.

River Point, in West Warwick, Rhode Island, United States, is a community made up of mill houses and three mills – the Valley Queen Mill, the Royal Mill and the Cotton Shed. Built in 1834 by the Greene Company, the Valley Queen Mill is the oldest of the three buildings. It originally operated as a cotton factory, producing coarse cotton cloths under the Greene Company name.

In 1888, B.B.& R. Knight Company, the textile giant that made Fruit of the Loom products, purchased the Valley Queen Mill. Over the next couple of years, they built the Royal Mill and the Cotton Shed. B.B. & R. Knight was a complete textile operation with combing, spinning and weaving facilities.

In 1922, its textile mills were temporarily shut down by the New England Textile Strike over an attempted wage cut and hours increase.

In 1931, the McIver Family, which owned The Original Bradford Soap Works, bought the Valley Queen Mill from the bankruptcy proceedings related to winding down the business affairs of the B.B. & R. Knight Company. In the 1960s, the Howland family took over the business. Under the leadership of the Howland family, today The Original Bradford Soap Works manufactures high quality bar soaps and soap bases in the Valley Queen Mill building.

In 1936, the Royal Mill was purchased by the Saybrooke Manufacturing Company. They produced wool fabrics for over 10 years. The mill then changed hands several times and the Royal Mill and Cotton Shed eventually sold to the Barrish Family which owned Ace Dyeing and Finishing.

When Ace Dyeing and Finishing went bankrupt in the 1990s, the state/town took over both the Royal Mill and the Cotton Shed for overdue taxes. Eventually, they enticed the Struever Brothers to convert the Royal Mill into apartments and more recently they convinced the Thundermist Medical Center to relocated to the Cotton Shed.

The name Riverpoint is derived by virtue of the fact that the North and South branches of the Pawtuxet River merge into a single river at the point immediately behind the Valley Queen Mill, which continues to be the home of Bradford Soap Works.

== Gallery ==
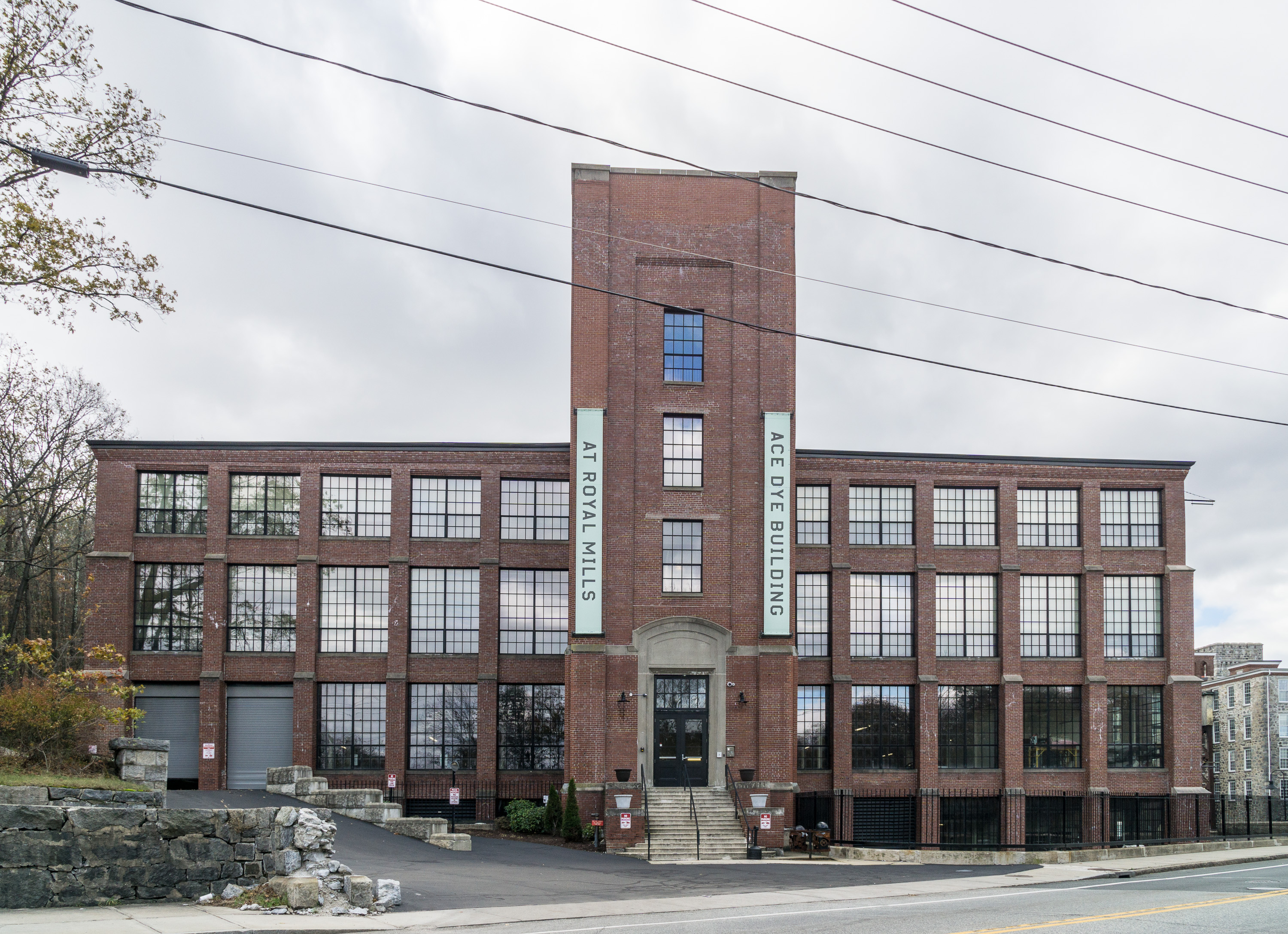
Ace Dye Building

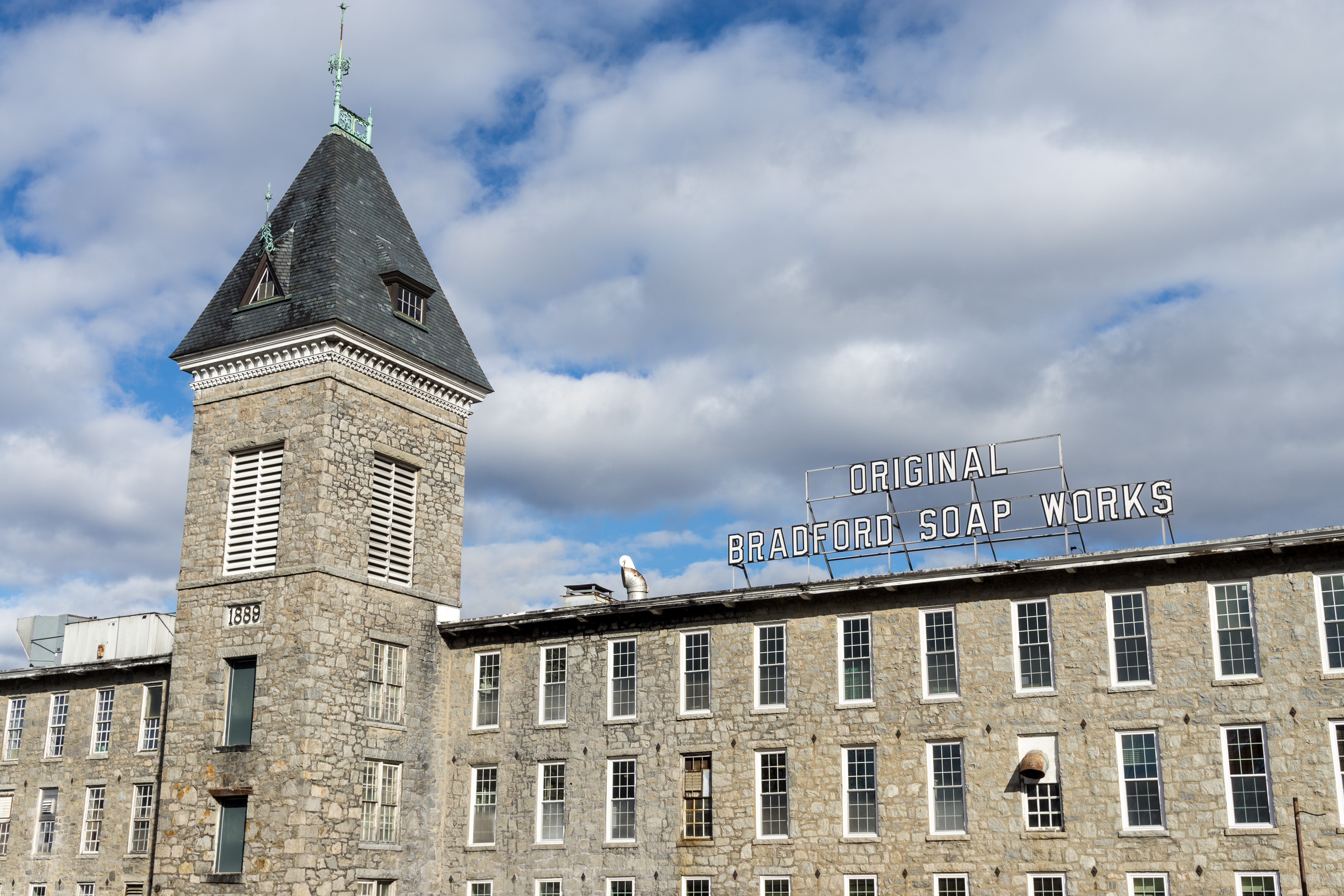
The Original Bradford Soap Works in the Valley Queen Mill

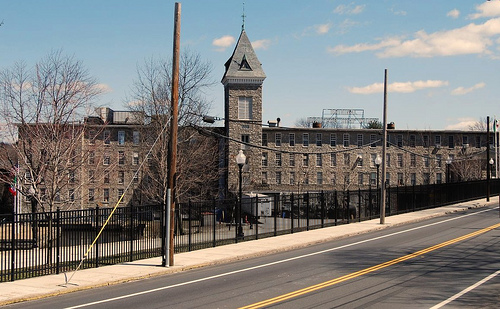
Valley Queen Mill

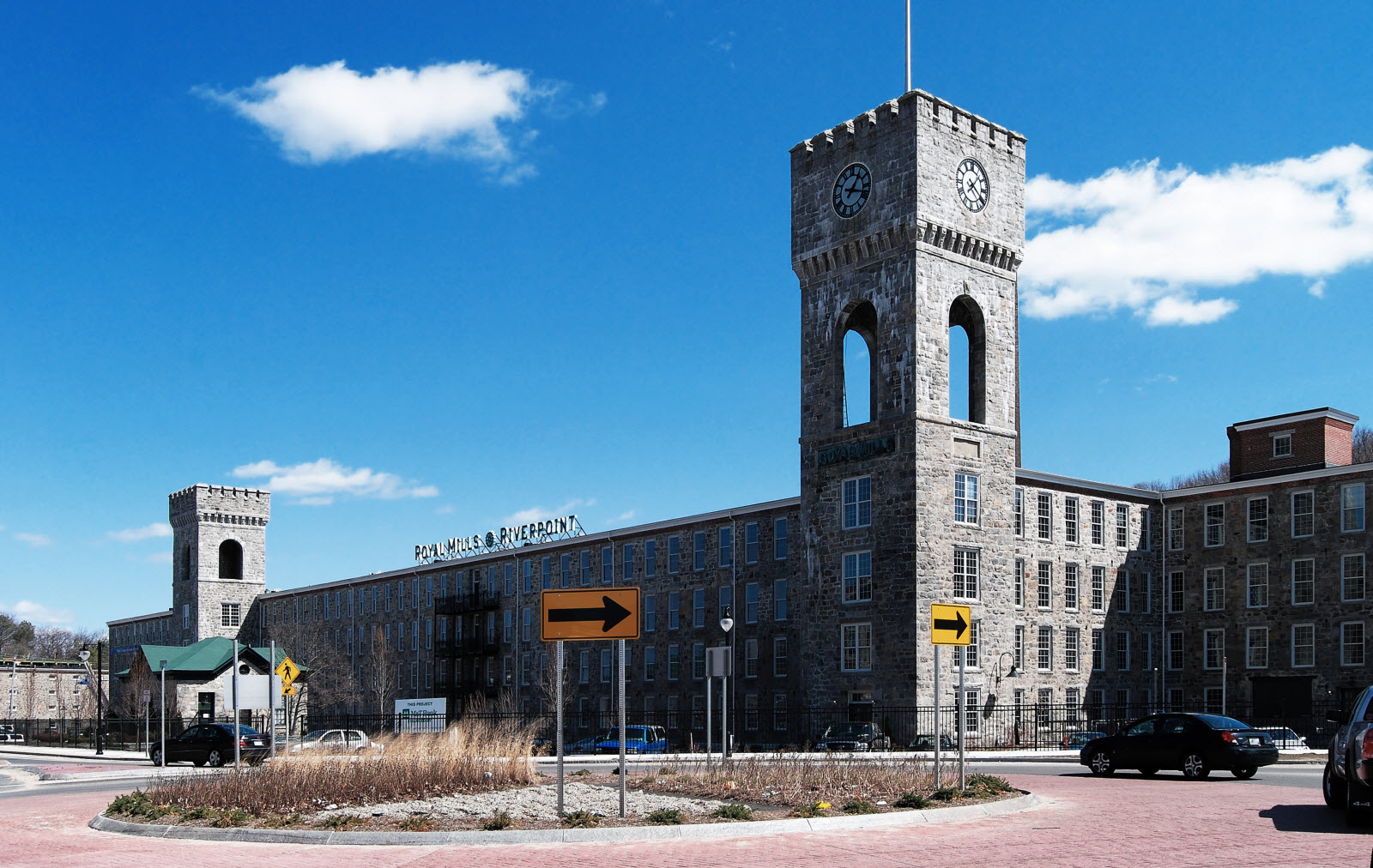
Royal Mills

== See also ==
- Royal Mill Complex
