= Blackstone Manufacturing Company Historic District =

Historic district in Massachusetts, United States

- U.S. National Register of Historic Places
- U.S. Historic district
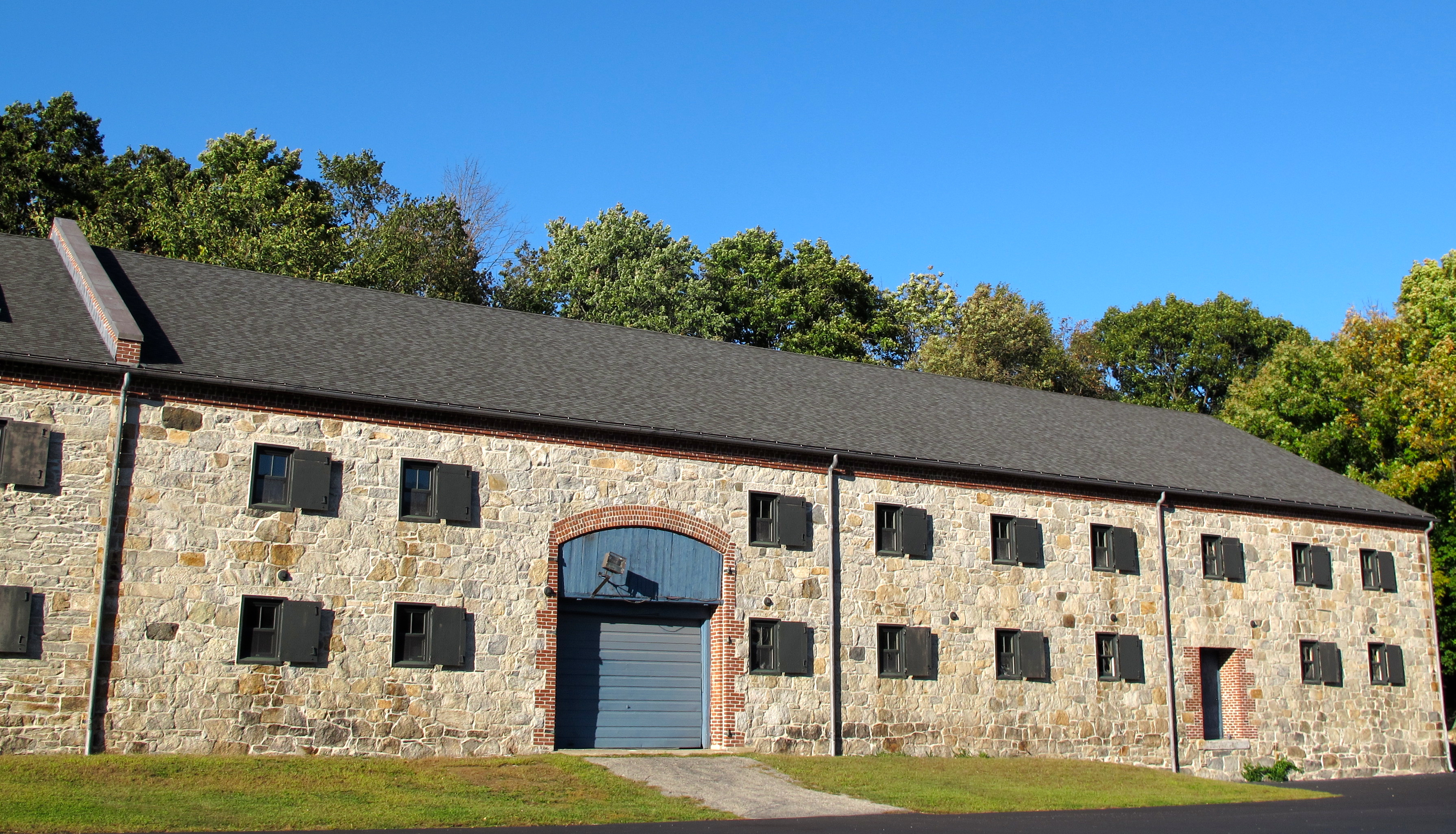

- Location within Massachusetts Location within the United States
- Location: Roughly the area surrounding Butler, Canal, Church, County, Ives, Main, Mendon, Old Mendon, and School Sts., Blackstone, Massachusetts
- Coordinates: 42°0′58″N 71°32′41″W
- Area: 30 acres (12 ha)
- Architectural style: Greek Revival, Italianate, Queen Anne
- NRHP reference No.: 95001038
- Added to NRHP: August 25, 1995

The Blackstone Manufacturing Company Historic District encompasses the "New City" or "High Rocks" area of Blackstone, Massachusetts, an industrial village associated with the Blackstone Manufacturing Company, which began operations in 1809. It includes an area roughly surrounding Butler, Canal, Church, County, Ives, Main, Mendon, Old Mendon, and School Streets. The district includes a wide variety of worker housing, as well as a granite storehouse, the only surviving company structure. The district was added to the National Register of Historic Places in 1995.

== Description and history ==
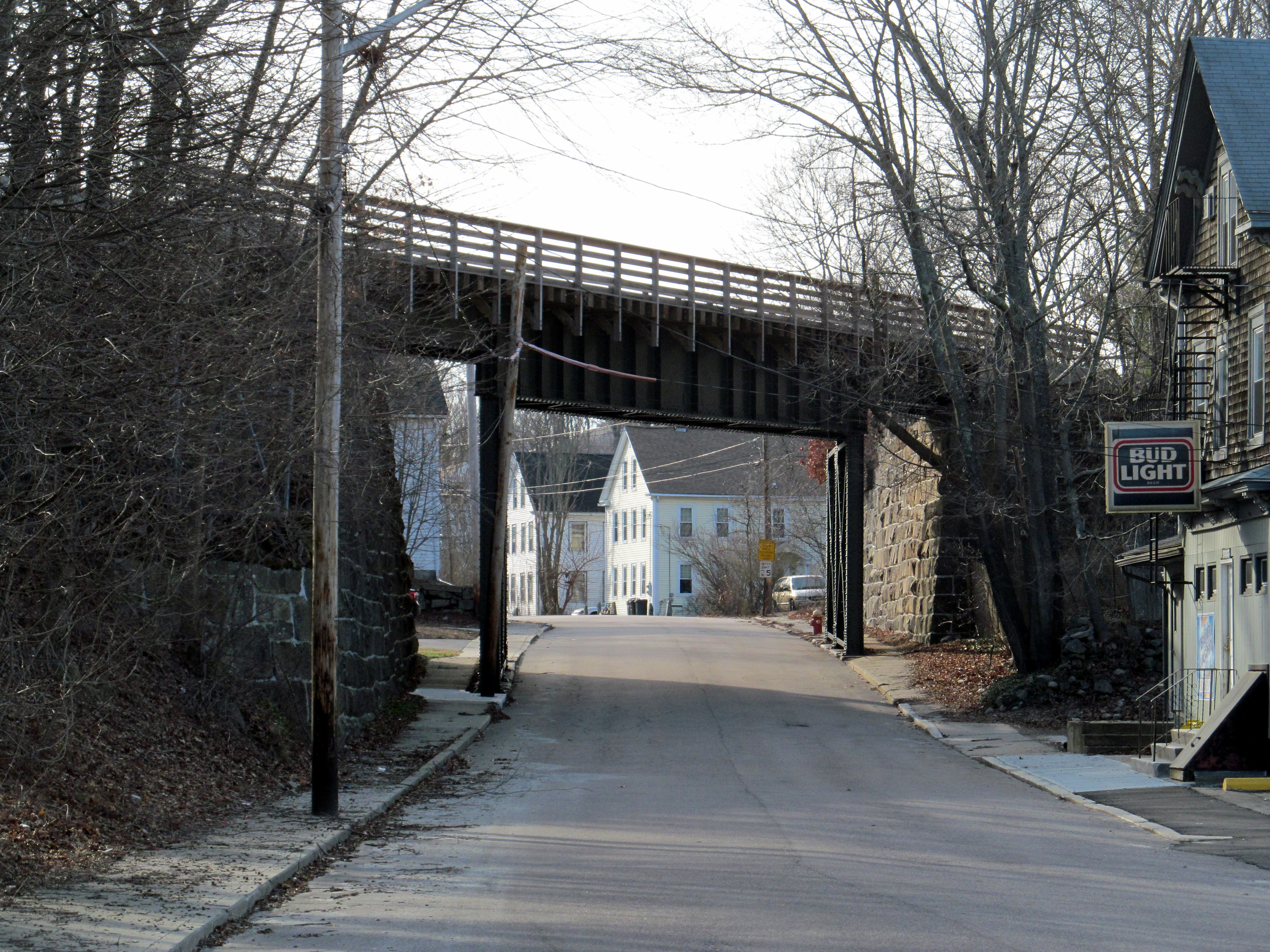
Southern New England Trunkline Trail bridge over Canal Street, one of four railroad bridges in the district

The Blackstone Manufacturing Company was founded in 1808 by investors from Providence, Rhode Island, and was one of several such companies that developed the Blackstone River industrially. Its early growth was instrumental in the growth of Blackstone Village in the 19th century. The company owned much of the land in the village, building it out as a company town, providing housing, a school and church, and other services for its workers. Its mill was located at the end of what is now called Old Mendon Street, and included one of the first mills built anywhere in the United States after the Slater Mill in Pawtucket. The complex now survives mainly as archaeological remnants, including filled-in raceways and other features. The company remained in independent operation until 1924, when it was acquired by the Lonsdale Company.

The historic district occupies an irregular area roughly bounded on the north by Main Street and the east by Bridge Street. The eastern portion of this area is where the mill complex was located, and to its west lies a small grid of streets that were built out by the company with housing. Most of this housing took the form of tenements housing anywhere from two to six units, built with wood frames and originally finished in clapboards. There were a few single-family residences built by the company, as well as the Blackstone Inn, built about 1920, the 1836 Greek Revival Congregational Church, and two school buildings.

== See also ==
- 1922 New England Textile Strike
- National Register of Historic Places listings in Worcester County, Massachusetts
