= Valley Queen Mill =

- U.S. National Register of Historic Places
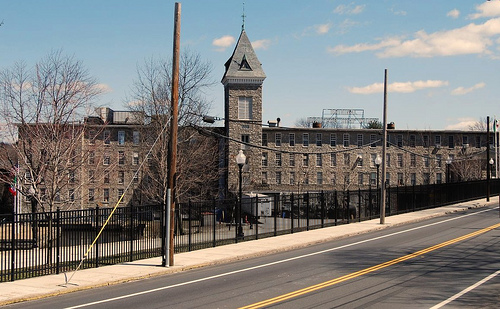
- Valley Queen Mill

- Location within Rhode Island Location within the United States
- Location: West Warwick, Rhode Island
- Coordinates: 41°42′52″N 71°30′44″W
- Area: 3.4 acres (1.4 ha)
- Built: 1834
- Architect: Thomas Peck & Stephen Norton, D.M. Thompson
- NRHP reference No.: 84001880
- Added to NRHP: January 19, 1984

The Valley Queen Mill is an historic mill at 200 Providence Street in West Warwick, Rhode Island.

It is a five-story L-shaped stone building built in 1834 by the Greene Company. The mill is the oldest of the three mill buildings in the area. It originally operated as a cotton factory, producing coarse cotton cloths under the Greene Company name.

In 1888, B.B.& R. Knight Company, the textile giant that made Fruit of the Loom products, purchased the Valley Queen Mill, and enlarged the plant. B.B &.R. Knight was a complete textile operation with combing, spinning and weaving facilities.

On January 23, 1922, the workers at the Valley Queen Mill struck, following the lead of their neighboring workers at the Royal Mill, who walked out in response to an attempted 20% wage cut. Soon the entire Pawtuxet River Valley was shut down, the strike spread and became the 1922 New England Textile Strike.

In 1931, the McIver Family, which owned The Original Bradford Soap Works, bought the Valley Queen Mill after B.B. & R Knight Company went bankrupt. In the 1960s, the Howland Family took over the business. Under the leadership of the Howland family, today Bradford Soap continues to manufacture bar soaps and soap bases in the building.

The mill was listed on the National Register of Historic Places in 1984.

== See also ==
- National Register of Historic Places listings in Kent County, Rhode Island
