= Pontiac Mills =

Coordinates: 41°43′36.8″N 71°28′13.3″W

- U.S. National Register of Historic Places
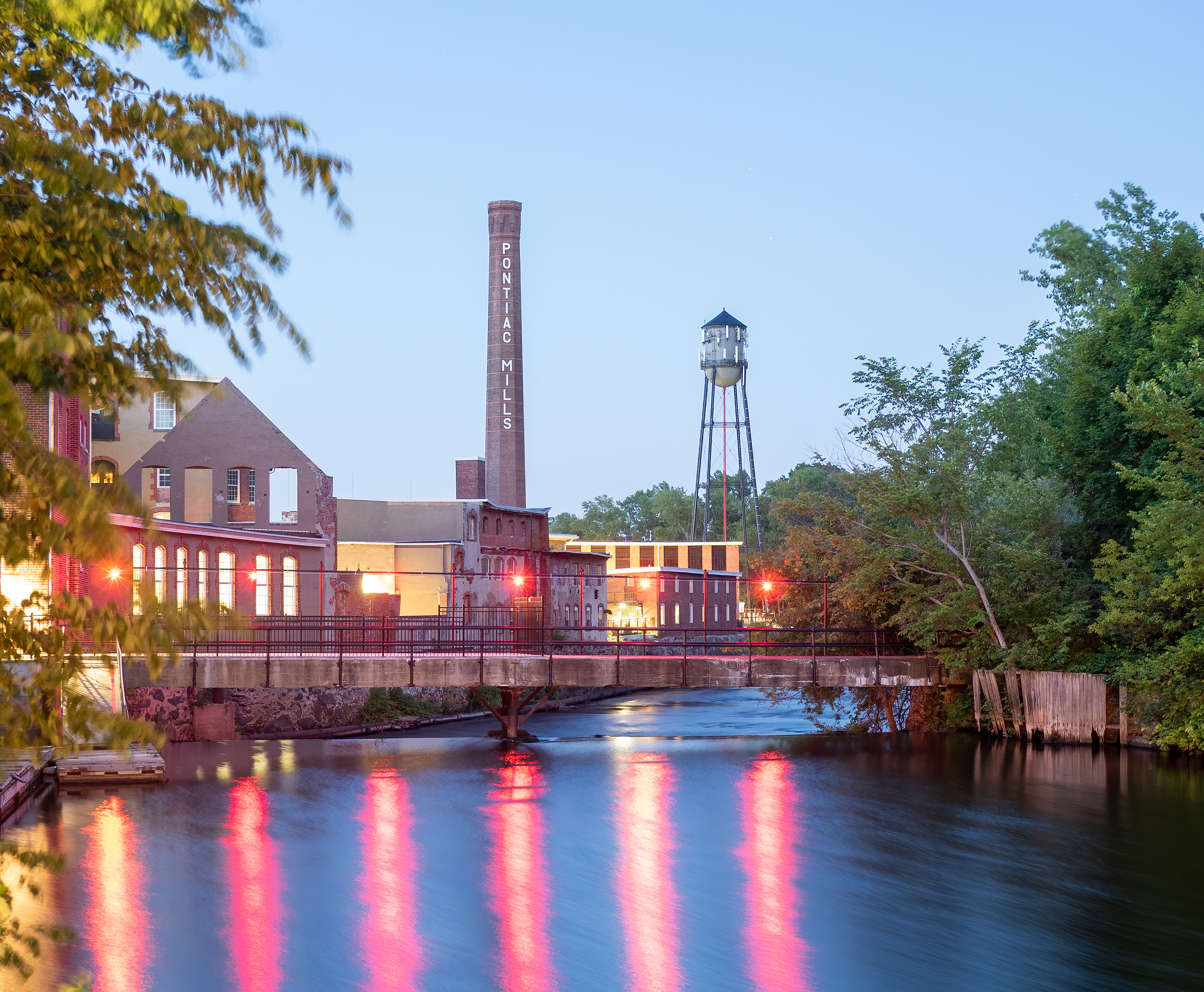
- Pontiac Mills in 2021

- Location within Rhode Island Location within the United States
- Location: Warwick, Rhode Island
- Built: 1863
- Architect: Clifton A. Hall
- NRHP reference No.: 72000019
- Added to NRHP: June 5, 1972

Pontiac Mills is a historic textile mill complex on Knight Street in the village of Pontiac, Rhode Island within the city of Warwick. The mills produced the original Fruit of the Loom brand of cloth.

The current mills were built beginning in 1863 by Robert Knight and Benjamin Knight (B.B. & R. Knight Company) to replace a smaller textile mill they had acquired from US Senator John Hopkins Clarke. Robert Knight, formerly a clerk at the mill's company store, had begun leasing the mill upon Clarke's election to the US senate in 1846, before purchasing it outright in 1850. The Knights later demolished it to erect the current mill in 1863.

The mills produced uniforms for Union soldiers during the American Civil War. In 1920 Webster Knight sold Fruit of the Loom and the Pontiac Mills to the Consolidated Textile Corporation of New York for approximately $20 million, one of the largest deals ever made in the textile industry at that time.

== 1922 strike and riots ==
Shortly thereafter, the mill became involved in one of the largest worker strikes of the era, after wages were cut by 20% and a 54-hour work week mandated. The strike resulted in 150 people being evicted from their mill-owned homes, as well as riots and attacks on the mill, following which the National Guard was called in by Rhode Island governor Emery J. San Souci and machine guns mounted to the roofs of Pontiac Mill and nearby Natick Mill.

== Decline and reopening ==
The textile industry overall in New England began declining shortly after this period but Pontiac Mills continued. The mill ceased operations in 1970, and was added to the National Register of Historic Places in 1972.

In 1995 a new owner attempted to revive the mill with new tenants including stores selling antiques, furniture, and jewelry.

The mills reopened in 2018 as Pontiac Lofts luxury mill apartments, with additional tenants Apponaug Brewing Company, Studio B salon, and On The Ropes Boxing.

== See also ==
- National Register of Historic Places listings in Kent County, Rhode Island
- Fruit of the Loom
- Benjamin Knight
- Knight Estate
- Robert Knight (industrialist)
