= Charles G. Hawkins =

Canadian politician

Member of the Senate of Canada for Milford-Hants, Nova Scotia division
- In office 2 May 1950 – 14 August 1958

Personal details
- Born: Charles G. Hawkins; 15 October 1887 Lawrencetown, Nova Scotia
- Died: 14 August 1958 (aged 70) Ottawa, Ontario
- Party: Liberal
- Spouse: Nellie Clare Wright
- Profession: lumberman

Charles G. Hawkins (15 October 1887 – 14 August 1958) was a Liberal party member of the Senate of Canada. He was born in Lawrencetown, Nova Scotia and became a lumberman.

The son of George Gerald Hawkins and Edith Peppard, he was educated in Lawrencetown and entered the lumber trade at Milford Station, Nova Scotia. Hawkins was president of Riversdale Lumber Ltd. In 1922, he married Nellie Clare Wright.

He was appointed to the Senate for the Milford-Hants, Nova Scotia division on 2 May 1950 following nomination by Prime Minister Louis St. Laurent. Hawkins remained a Senator until his death on 14 August 1958.
