= Knight Estate =

Historic house in Rhode Island, United States

- U.S. National Register of Historic Places
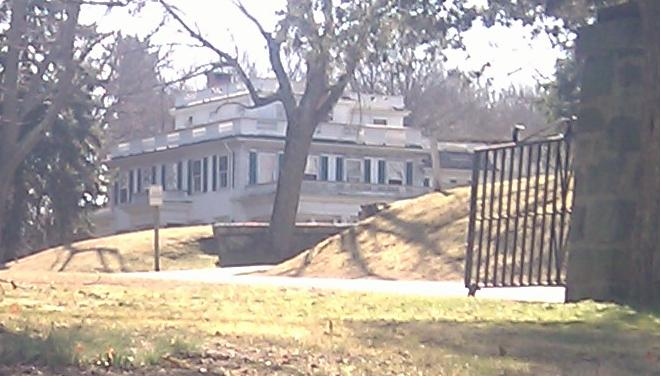

- Location within Rhode Island Location within the United States
- Location: 486 East Avenue, Warwick, Rhode Island
- Coordinates: 41.717372°N 71.480768°W
- Built: c.1830; 1920s
- Architectural style: Federal; Greek Revival; Colonial Revival
- MPS: Warwick MRA
- NRHP reference No.: 84001864
- Added to NRHP: February 23, 1984

The Knight Estate is a historic estate in Warwick, Rhode Island, that is home to the Knight Campus of the Community College of Rhode Island. Developed as a country estate for a family of industrialists and later donated to the state, the main house and its outbuildings were listed on the United States National Register of Historic Places in 1984.

== History ==
The house was built for industrialist William Sprague II circa 1830 as the centerpiece of his country estate, Natick Farm. Sprague was owner of the Cranston Print Works, and had begun developing his interests at the Natick Mills beginning in 1821. When he died in 1836, the business was reorganized by his sons, Amasa and William III, as A. & W. Sprague. William Sprague III was the firm's agent at Natick and occupied the house. The younger Sprague was a major benefactor to the village of Natick. The Natick Baptist Church was built with funds donated by him in 1838, and the village school, built in 1850, occupied a lot donated to the town by Sprague. After his death in 1856, the house continued to be owned by his descendants. From 1856 the senior member of the firm was his son, Byron Sprague. From his retirement in 1862 until its insolvency, William Sprague IV operated the firm.

After the failure of the A. & W. Sprague Manufacturing Company in the Panic of 1873, the company was held in trust by Zechariah Chafee. Chafee was appointed trustee by the creditors of the Sprague interests to liquidate the Sprague debts. The estate was purchased by the firm of B. B. & R. Knight in 1875. The estate was then developed as a country retreat by Robert Knight. In 1883, B. B. & R. Knight also bought the Natick Mills. Robert Knight's son, Webster Knight (1854-1933), was appointed manager of the Natick Mills and moved into the house at Natick Farm. He lived there until he moved to Providence in 1898, maintaining the house as his country residence and developing the property as a gentleman's farm. In 1920, Webster Knight and his brother C. Prescott Knight divested themselves of B. B. & R. Knight, selling the entire company to the Consolidated Textile Corporation of New York. Webster Knight then converted the house at Natick Farm back into his full-time residence.

Knight lived in the house until his death in 1933. The property was occupied and maintained by his daughter, Adelaide Knight, until her death in 1948, after which it became the property of his grandson, Royal Webster Knight. In 1964 Knight gave the property to the state to be used as the campus of the Community College of Rhode Island. The college, then known as the Rhode Island Junior College, opened on the property in 1972. The property was named the "Knight Campus" in honor of the Knight family.

The main house was repurposed as a home for the president of the college. The first to move into the house was Edward J. Liston in 1978. Since that time it has been the official home of the college presidents. Six years after Liston moved in, the house and its grounds were listed on the National Register of Historic Places.

== Architecture ==
Built circa 1830, the main house represents a transitional moment between the Federal and Greek Revival styles. The plan and massing are typical of Georgian and Federal houses, in that it is a symmetrical five-bay, two-story house with a low hipped roof, not visible from the street. The house also has a rooftop monitor. Other architectural elements, including the Doric main portico and much interior detailing, are more typical of the Greek Revival style.

When Webster Knight converted the house into his full-time residence in the 1920s, he made several alterations. These included the extension of the real ell for a large dining room, modernization of the interior and the addition of flanking porches. All of this work was designed to match the original.

Also on the property are a number of outbuildings, dating from the Knight family's development of the property as a gentleman's farm. At the time of the property's listing on the National Register, an unusual wooden water tower stood at the southwest corner of the yard, but this has since collapsed.

The designers, either of the original house or Knight's alterations, are not known. Knight's house on Princeton Avenue in Providence, built for him in 1898, was designed by architect Frank W. Angell.

== See also ==
- National Register of Historic Places listings in Kent County, Rhode Island
- Robert Knight (industrialist)
