= John Hopkins Clarke =

American politician

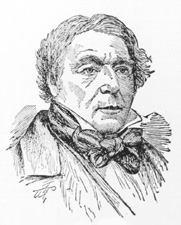

United States Senator from Rhode Island
- In office March 4, 1847 – March 3, 1853
- Preceded by: James F. Simmons
- Succeeded by: Philip Allen

Member of the Rhode Island House of Representatives
- In office 1836–1842; 1845–1847

Personal details
- Born: April 1, 1789 Elizabeth, New Jersey, U.S.
- Died: November 23, 1870 (aged 81) Providence, Rhode Island, U.S.
- Party: Whig
- Children: Edward Clarke
- Profession: Politician, Lawyer, Manufacturer

John Hopkins Clarke (April 1, 1789 – November 23, 1870) was a United States senator from Rhode Island. Born in Elizabeth, New Jersey, he moved to Providence, where he studied under a private teacher. He graduated from Brown University in 1809, studied law, was admitted to the bar and commenced practice in Providence in 1812. He was clerk of the supreme court of Providence County in 1813 and proprietor of a distillery in Cranston until 1824, when he became a cotton manufacturer in Providence, Pontiac, and Woonsocket. He was a member of the Rhode Island House of Representatives from 1836 to 1842 and 1845 to 1847.

Clarke was elected as a Whig to the US Senate and served from March 4, 1847, to March 3, 1853; he resumed his former manufacturing pursuits and died in Providence in 1870. The interment was in the North Burial Ground.

U.S. Senate
Preceded by James F. Simmons	U.S. senator (Class 2) from Rhode Island; March 4, 1847 – March 3, 1853; Served alongside: Albert C. Greene and Charles T. James	Succeeded by Philip Allen
