= Fruit of the Loom =

American clothing manufacturer

Fruit of the Loom, Inc.

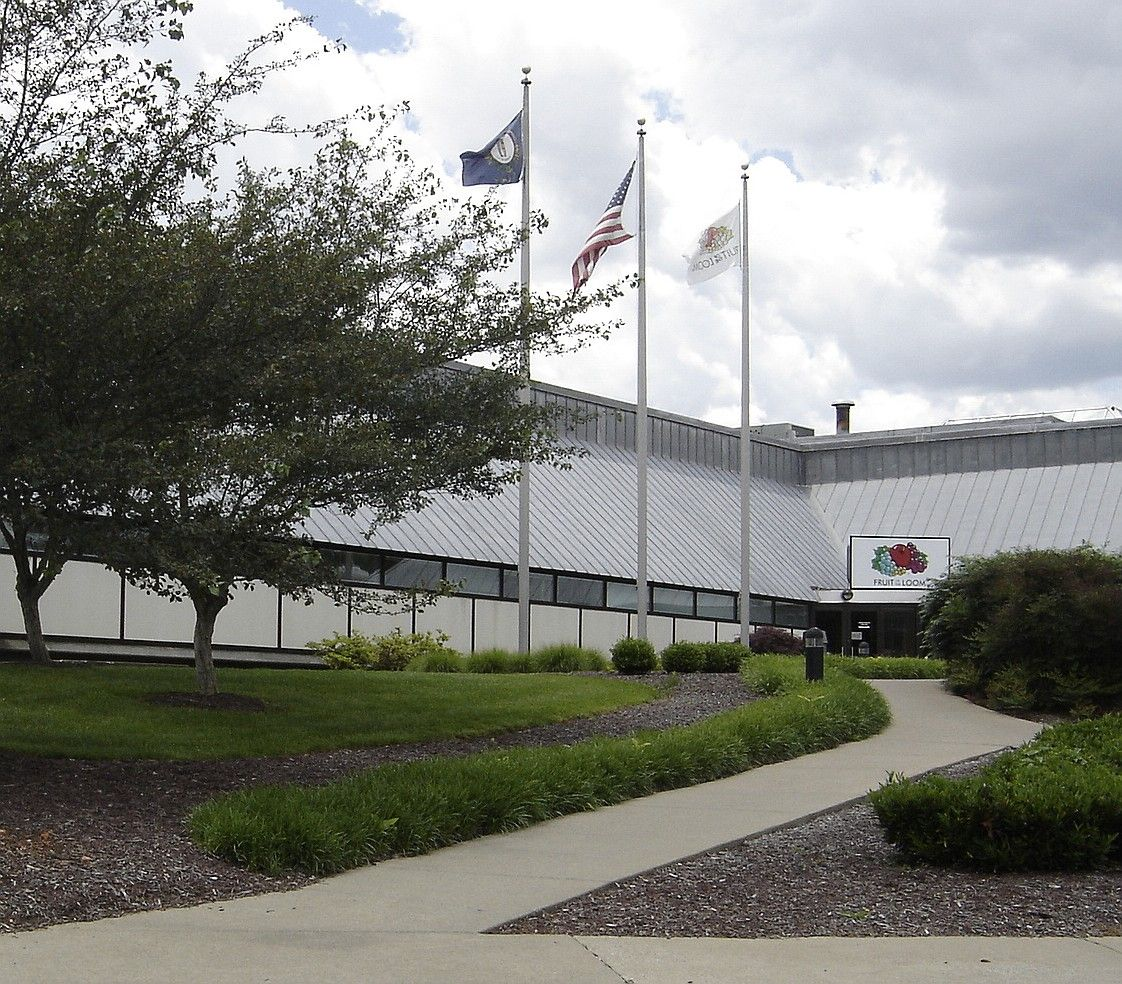
- Company headquarters building in Bowling Green, Kentucky
- Type: Subsidiary
- Industry: Textiles; Sports equipment
- Founded: 1851; 175 years ago in Warwick, Rhode Island as B.B. and R. Knight Corp.
- Founders: Robert Knight; Benjamin Knight
- Headquarters: Bowling Green, Kentucky, United States
- Area served: Worldwide
- Products: Clothing • Casual wear • Sportswear; Sports equipment
- Brands: Exquisite Form
- Number of employees: 32,400
- Parent: Berkshire Hathaway
- Subsidiaries: Russell Athletic; Spalding; Vanity Fair (intimates)
- Website: www.fruit.com

Fruit of the Loom is an American company that manufactures clothing, particularly mass market casual wear and underwear. The company's world headquarters are located in Bowling Green, Kentucky. Since 2002, it has been a wholly owned subsidiary of Berkshire Hathaway.

Products manufactured by Fruit of the Loom itself and through its subsidiaries include clothing (t-shirts, hoodies, jackets, sweatpants, shorts and lingerie), and sports equipment (softballs and basketballs) manufactured and commercialized by Spalding.

== Company profile ==
Fruit of the Loom is one of the largest manufacturers and marketers of underwear, printable T-shirts and fleece for the activewear industry, casualwear, women's jeanswear, and childrenswear. The company employs more than 32,400 people worldwide.

The company is a vertically integrated manufacturer. In 2006, Fruit of the Loom acquired Russell Brands, LLC, a global company whose brands included Russell Athletic, Brooks Sports and Spalding, among other names in athletic wear, for US$598.3 million. Brooks became an independent subsidiary within Berkshire Hathaway in 2011.

=== Logo misconception ===
The company's logo has been the subject of a misconception amongst the public. The company's logo comprises a red apple, leaves, green grapes, purple grapes, and white currants (or yellow gooseberries), but not a cornucopia. In July 2023, a Snopes reporter said that a search of newspaper advertisements between the 1920s and 2020s revealed none that depicted a cornucopia, despite many consumers recalling that the trademark did contain one. The misconception is often cited as an example of the Mandela effect.

== History ==
=== Rhode Island beginnings ===
The origin of the Fruit of the Loom company dates back to 1851 in Rhode Island, when textile mill owner Robert Knight and his brother Benjamin established the "B.B. and R. Knight Corporation" after they acquired the Pontiac Mills in Warwick, Rhode Island. In 1856, the company introduced the brand name "Fruit of the Loom", while producing its first muslins. The company purchased the Dedham Manufacturing Company on Mother Brook in Dedham, Massachusetts in 1877.

A friend of Robert Knight named Rufus Skeel owned a small shop in Providence that sold cloth from Knight's mill. Skeel's daughter painted images of apples and applied them to the bolts of cloth. The ones with the apple emblems proved most popular. Knight thought the labels would be the perfect symbol for his trade name, Fruit of the Loom – an expression referring to clothes, paralleling the phrase "fruit of the womb", which can be traced back to the Bible (Genesis 30:2, Psalms 127:3).

In 1871, just one year after the first trademark laws were passed by Congress, Knight received trademark number 418 for the brand "Fruit of the Loom". Much of its athletic outerwear was sold under the "Pro Player" label, a now defunct division.

=== 20th century ===
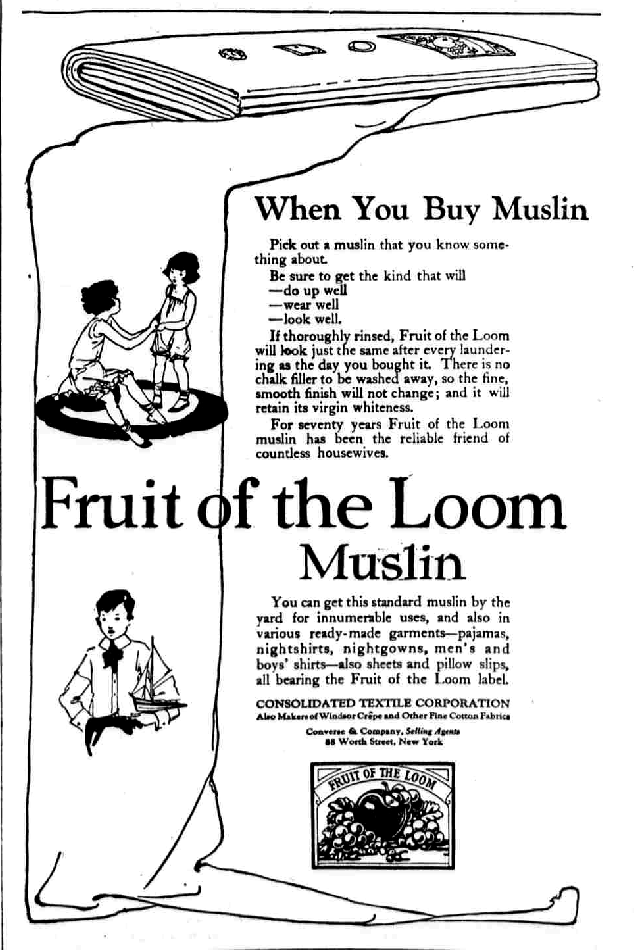
Newspaper ad for Fruit of the Loom muslin fabric (1921)

In 1932, the company opened its first Kentucky plant in Frankfort with about 100 employees, with additional plants following in Bowling Green, Ohio (1941) and Campbellsville (1947). The Frankfort operation moved to a new, larger building in 1965, and the Jamestown plant opened in 1981 with further expansion planned.

The company was part of Northwest Industries, Inc., until NWI was purchased by William F. Farley in 1985 and renamed Farley Industries, Inc.

Farley served as president, CEO, and majority shareholder for 15 years. Fruit of the Loom's sales revenue rose from approximately US$500 million at the time of NWI's purchase (equivalent to $1.5 billion in 2025) to roughly US$2.5 billion nearly 15 years later (equivalent to $4.67 billion in 2025), about a three-fold increase after inflation. Debt financing proved difficult to manage, however, even as dollar sales revenue quintupled.

On March 23, 1987, the company sold its subsidiary General Battery to Exide Corporation.

The Jamestown plant reached peak employment of over 3,200 in 1990. In the 1990s, the American textile industry overall experienced widespread downsizing in the wake of North American Free Trade Agreement and General Agreement on Tariffs and Trade.

In 1995, Chairman Farley announced that the company would close six plants in the Southeastern United States, and cut back operations at two others. Operations were moved to cheaper plants abroad. 3,200 workers, or about 12 percent of its American work force, were laid off. Farley also announced that company earnings fell 22 percent, despite a 10 percent increase in sales. In 1998, the company closed its plant in Campbellsville, which employed 812 workers at the time and Frankfort plant in 2000, which employed 280 workers.

In 1999, Fruit of the Loom filed for Chapter 11 bankruptcy protection, shortly after posting a net loss of $576.2 million. Its 66 million shares of outstanding common stock dropped in value from about $44 per share in early 1997 to just more than $1 by spring 2000. Reasons for the bankruptcy are varied. A large debt load incurred in the 1980s, a common practice at the time, did not help. William F. "Bill" Farley, the company's former chairman, CEO, and COO, was ousted prior to the bankruptcy filing in late 1999, after having piloted the company into massive debt and unproductive business ventures, including structuring the company into an off-shore entity in the Cayman Islands to avoid taxes.

=== 21st century ===
The company was bought from bankruptcy by Berkshire Hathaway Corporation, controlled by investor Warren Buffett, who wanted the valuable brand. He agreed in January 2002 to purchase the company for approximately $835 million in cash. The deal was concluded on April 29, 2002. A condition of the purchase required that former COO and then interim CEO John Holland remain available to be the CEO for the company.

The company purchased Russell Brands, effectively taking the former competitor private, in a deal valued at $598.3 million which completed on August 1, 2006.

The company announced the purchase of VF Corporation's intimate apparel company named Vanity Fair Intimates for $350 million in cash on January 23, 2007. This company was renamed Vanity Fair Brands and is operated as a wholly-owned subsidiary.

In 2010, Rick Medlin was named president and CEO of Fruit of the Loom. Longtime CEO John Holland became the company's chairman. In 2014, the company closed its Jamestown plant, which had once been the second manufacturing plant in the state, and laid off all 600 employees. The company acknowledged it was moving the plant's operations to Honduras to reduce production costs.

In December 2016, Melissa Burgess Taylor was named chairman and CEO of Fruit of the Loom by Buffett after the death of Rick Medlin.

== Bibliography ==
- Zagorin, Adam (November 1, 1999). "The fruit of its labor: How a company that exports jobs pushes for a Capitol Hill handout". CNN. Archived from the original on October 25, 2025.
- Hamburg, Mark D.; Hoefken, Stephanie (April 30, 2002). "Berkshire Hathaway Completes Acquisition of Fruit of the Loom". Berkshire Hathaway. Archived from the original on August 19, 2022.
- "Buffett's Berkshire to buy Russell". CNN Money. April 17, 2006. Archived from the original on December 9, 2024.
