= Charles Hawkins (Medal of Honor) =

American Medal of Honor recipient

- Civil War era Navy Medal of Honor
- Born: 1834 or 1835; Scotland
- Died: February 29, 1908; Rhode Island
- Burial place: Saint Mary Cemetery
- Military career
- Allegiance: Union
- Branch: Navy
- Rank: Seaman
- Unit: (United States Navy) USS Agawam
- Conflicts: American Civil War; First Battle of Fort Fisher
- Awards: Medal of Honor

Charles Hawkins (1834 or 1835 - February 29, 1908) was a Seaman in the Union Navy during the American Civil War, where he was awarded the Civil War Congressional Medal of Honor. Hawkins was born in either 1834 or 1835, depending on the source, in Scotland. He lived in Portsmouth, New Hampshire, and enlisted in the Union Navy from New Hampshire. He served on board the USS Agawam, as one of a volunteer crew of a powder boat. He was given his Medal of Honor on December 23, 1864, when his boat exploded on that date near Fort Fisher. His boat was towed in by USS Wilderness to prevent detection by the enemy, and less than two hours after boarding the boat, the explosion took place, and the following day fires were observed still burning at the forts. Hawkins was awarded his Medal of Honor on December 31, 1864. He died on February 29, 1908, in Rhode Island. He was buried in Saint Mary Cemetery in West Warwick, Rhode Island.

== See also ==
- First Battle of Fort Fisher
- USS Agawam
