= Pawtuxet River =

River in the U.S. state of Rhode Island

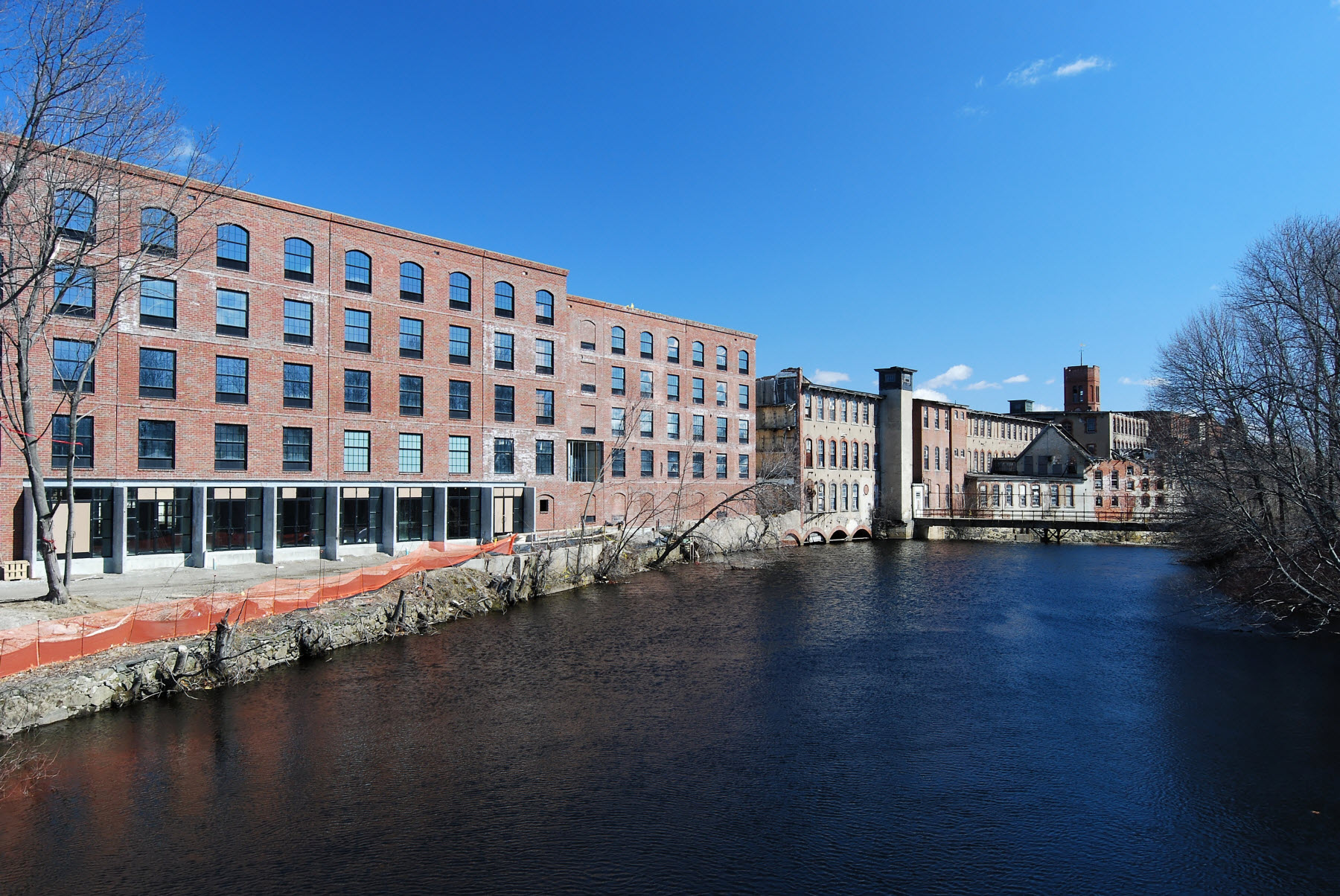
- Original home of the Fruit of the Loom Company on the Pawtuxet River at Pontiac Village Warwick

Location
- Country: United States
- State: Rhode Island

Physical characteristics
- Source
  - location: Kent County, Rhode Island
- Mouth
  - location: Providence River
  - coordinates: 41.764416°N 71.389094°W
- Discharge
  - location: Providence River

The Pawtuxet River (/ˈpɔːtʌksɪt/ PAW-tuk-sit), also known as the Pawtuxet River Main Stem and the Lower Pawtuxet, is a river in the U.S. state of Rhode Island. It flows 12.3 miles (19.8 km) and empties into the upper Narragansett Bay of the Atlantic Ocean. Together with its two main tributary branches, the North Branch Pawtuxet River and the South Branch Pawtuxet River, it drains a watershed of 231.6 square miles (600 km^{2}), all of which is in the state of R.I.

== History ==
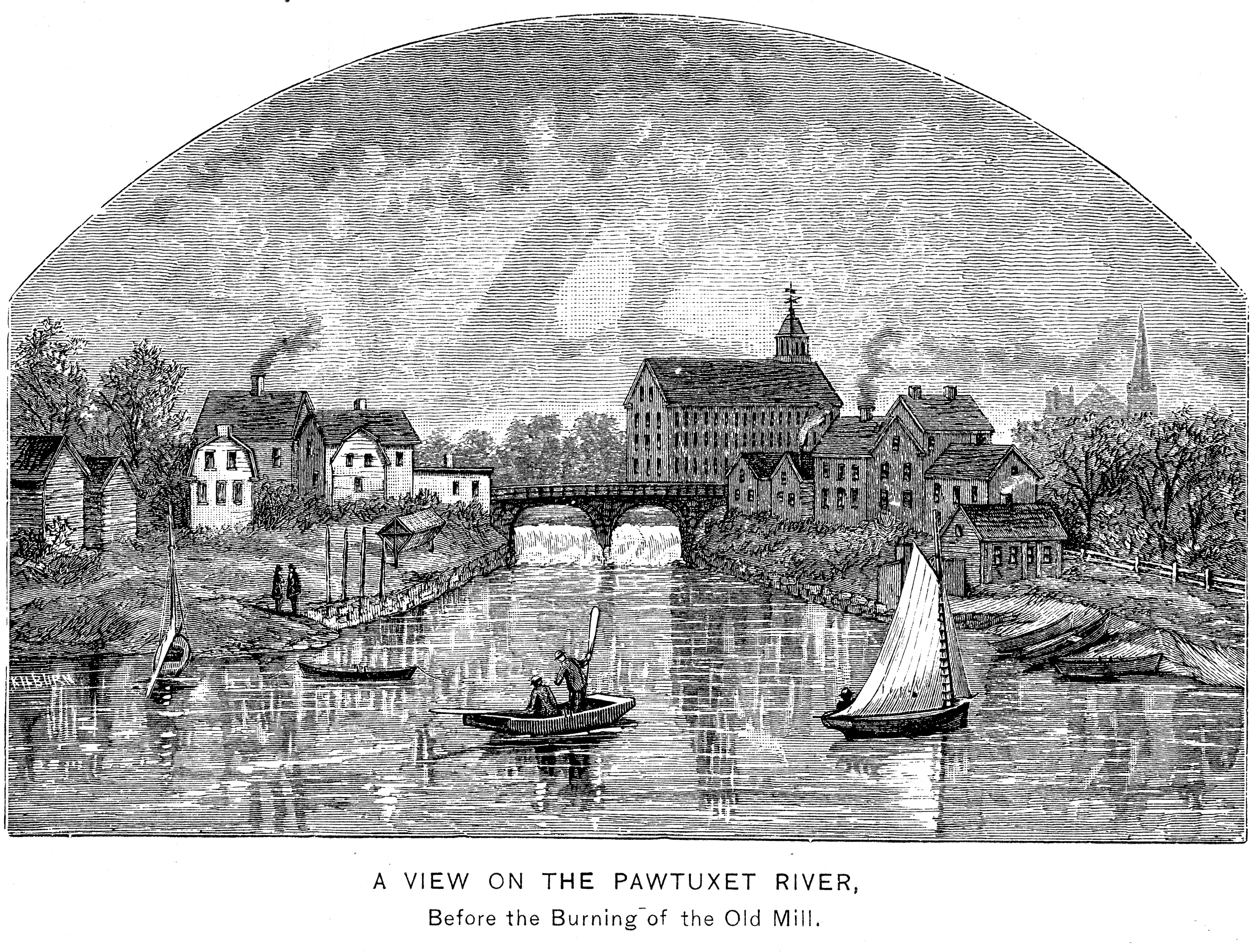
Pawtuxet River, 1886 engraving.

The area around the river was occupied by members of the Native American Patuxet tribe, who were part of the larger Narragansett tribe. In the native language, the word "pawtuxet" may mean "little falls," though this translation is not certain.

In 1638, Roger Williams purchased the land north of the Pawtuxet, thus founding Providence. In 1642, Samuel Gorton purchased the land south of the river, thus founding Warwick. Collectively, all three branches of the Pawtuxet played an important role in the development of the textile industry in New England, which utilized the river system for hydromechanical and later early hydroelectric power during the 19th century. Located on the lower Pawtuxet were the Natick Mill in West Warwick, the Bellefonte Mill in Cranston and the Pontiac Mills in Warwick, which was the original manufacturing facility of the Fruit of the Loom Company.

== Course ==
The river is formed by the confluence of North Branch Pawtuxet River and South Branch Pawtuxet River at the village of River Point in the town of West Warwick, Rhode Island. From there the river continues roughly east, through West Warwick, Warwick and Cranston, emptying into the Narragansett Bay at Pawtuxet Village. The last 3 miles (4.8 km) of the river form the boundary between the cities of Cranston and Warwick, RI.

== Crossings ==
Below is a list of all crossings over the Pawtuxet River. The list starts at the headwaters and goes downstream:

| Town | Carrying |
|---|---|
| West Warwick | Fairview Avenue |
| West Warwick | Main Street |
| West Warwick | Providence St. Water St. |
| Warwick | East Ave. |
| Warwick | Route 2 |
| Warwick | I-295 |
| Warwick | Route 5 |
| Warwick | Route 37 |
| Warwick | I-95 |
| Warwick | Northeast Corridor |
| Warwick | US 1 |
| Warwick | US 1A/ Route 117 |
| Warwick | Post Rd./Broad St. |

== Notable Tributaries ==
Meshanticut Brook, Three Ponds Brook, the Pocasset River and Mashapaug Brook are the Pawtuxet River's only named tributaries, though it has many unnamed streams that also feed it.

== Dams ==
The lower Pawtuxet had four known dams erected upon it, two of which have been partially removed: Natick Mill Pond Dam, Pontiac Mill Pond Dam, Providence Water Supply upper dam at Pettaconsett Village (partially removed), and the American Wood Paper Company/Providence Water Supply Lower Reservoir Dam at Pawtuxet Falls (partially removed).

== Water Quality ==
The Pawtuxet River has long been negatively impacted by industry and relative to its size was at one time considered one of the most industrialized rivers in the US. In 1893, the river was described as "a common, natural sewer of the Pawtuxet Valley". From the mid 1800s to the mid 1900s, extensive dumping of pollutants occurred, from both private and public activities. However, since the enactment of the federal Clean Water Act in 1972, and subsequent federal and state enforcement, it has become unfeasible to continue legal industrial process wastewater discharge into the river and all known private direct industrial process wastewater discharges have been eliminated throughout the Pawtuxet system. In addition, all municipal wastewater treatment plants discharging to the river have been upgraded to near-tertiary treatment levels.

According to the "State of Rhode Island 2018-2020 Impaired Waters Report-February 2021" the Lower Pawtuxet is considered impaired for phosphorus, mercury, enterococcus bacteria and invasive plants and is still yet to meet its targeted intended public use of fully supporting fish and wildlife, as well as primary (swimming) and secondary (boating) recreational contact.

The Lower Pawtuxet currently has three municipal wastewater treatment plants discharging into it-the West Warwick Wastewater Treatment Plant, the City of Warwick Sewer Authority and the City of Cranston Water Pollution Control Facility. About 38.4 million gallons a day of treated wastewater is discharged to the Lower Pawtuxet.

== Habitat restoration ==
In 2011, a partnership of private, municipal, state and federal partner led by the Pawtuxet River Authority, removed a dam at the mouth of the river to allow the first unrestricted passage of anadromous fish into the Pawtuxet system in over 200 years. This project created access of over 7.5 miles of freshwater spawning habitat for diadromous species from the Atlantic Ocean.

== Water use and availability ==
Rhode Island's capital city of Providence has long used the Pawtuxet River System for a centralized water supply. In the 1870's the Providence Water Supply Board created a water treatment facility at Pettaconsett Village in Cranston. Beginning the 1915, this operation was relocated to the town of Scituate on the Pawtuxet River North Branch, where it still operates today as the Scituate Reservoir. The Scituate Reservoir, providing over 60% of the State of Rhode Island with its potable water needs, and the Kent County Water Authority on the Pawtuxet River South Branch, together extract approximately 63 million gallons a day from the Pawtuxet System. About 24.6 million gallons of this water is supplied to other basins in Rhode Island including the Blackstone River, Ten Mile River, Moshassuck River, Woonasquatucket River, Narragansett Bay and the Westport River. About 34.8 million gallons a day of treated sewage is returned to Lower Pawtuxet.

== Flow ==
The US Geological Survey maintains nineteen stream flow gauges in the collective Pawtuxet Watershed:

The Pawtuxet River experiences periodic flooding. In October 2005 remnants of Tropical Storm Tammy produced torrential rains over New England. From October 13–15, the National Weather Service reported 7 to 9 inches (230 mm) of rain in Rhode Island and the Pawtuxet River at Cranston and Warwick recorded its second worst flood, cresting at a stage of 13.68 feet (4.17 m).

On March 15 and March 16, 2010, the Pawtuxet River reached a new record high flood level after receiving over three inches of rain on the 13th and 14th. The river crested at 15.2 feet (4.6 m) in the evening of March 15.

On March 29 and 30, 2010, an additional 6-10 inches of rainfall across Southern New England in addition to the 3+ inches that fell on the 23rd, bringing the total rainfall for the month of March to over 16" and causing the Pawtuxet River to exceed the previous flood level occurring only two weeks prior. The river crested at 20.8 feet (6.3 m) in the morning of March 31. This caused the worst flooding in over 200 years for the area, swamping the Warwick Mall, and many homes in the area forcing many evacuations across Rhode Island and Southeastern Massachusetts. The flooding also forced many schools to be closed for an extended period of time, due to road closures and washouts.

== Grassroots organizations ==
There are two river organizations that focus on the Pawtuxet River:

- The Pawtuxet River Authority and Watershed Council
- Friends of the Pawtuxet

== See also ==
- Interlaken Mill Bridge
- List of rivers in Rhode Island
- North Branch Pawtuxet River
- South Branch Pawtuxet River
