= William Vernon (disambiguation) =

William Vernon (1719–1806) was a New England trader.

William Vernon may also refer to:

- William H. Vernon (1944–2014), American businessman and politician
- William Silas Vernon (1871-1929), American politician
- William Tecumseh Vernon (1871–1944), American educator, minister and bishop in the African Methodist Episcopal Church
- William de Vernon, founder of the Vernon family
- William Vernon (died 1467), Knight-Constable of England
- William Warren Vernon (1834–1919), British noble and scholar

== See also ==
- Bill Vernon (1937–1996), American radio DJ
- Will Vernon, a character on the TV soap opera One Life to Live
