= William Vernon =

18th century American slave trader & merchant (1719–1806)

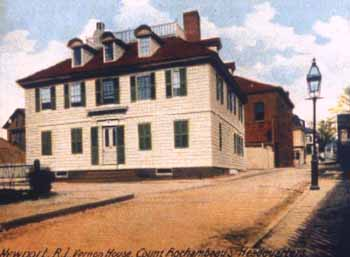
- William Vernon's Home, Newport, Rhode Island
- Born: January 17, 1719; Newport, Colony of Rhode Island and Providence Plantations
- Died: December 22, 1806 (aged 87); Newport, Rhode Island
- Burial place: Vernon Cemetery; Newport, Rhode Island
- Occupations: Merchant and slave trader
- Parents: Samuel Vernon (father); Elizabeth Fleet (mother)

William Vernon (January 17, 1719 – December 22, 1806), of Newport, Rhode Island, was a merchant in the Atlantic slave trade who played a leading role in the Continental Congress' maritime activities during the American Revolution. In 1774, Vernon was member of the committee of correspondence between Newport and Boston. As president of the Eastern Navy Board during the Revolution, he was responsible for building and outfitting the ships of the Continental Navy. William Vernon was one of the charter members of the Artillery Company of Newport, and is the namesake of the Vernon House.

== Family ==
William Vernon was born in Newport, Rhode Island in 1719 to a local silversmith, Samuel Vernon (December 6, 1683 - December 5, 1737) and his wife Elizabeth Fleet. Vernon's family was directly descended from one of Rhode Island's first pioneers, Anne Hutchinson. William's older brother Thomas became royal postmaster in Newport, a position he held for thirty years. He was also senior warden of Trinity Church, and Secretary of the Redwood Library. A Loyalist, Thomas fled Newport in 1776. Unlike their loyalist brother, who was an Anglican, William and his older brother Samuel (September 6, 1711 - 1792) were both members of Newport's Second Congregational Church, which was pastored by Ezra Stiles. William Vernon married Judith Harwood, who was a direct descendant of Jeremy Clarke and John Cranston. William and Judith had two sons, Samuel and William.

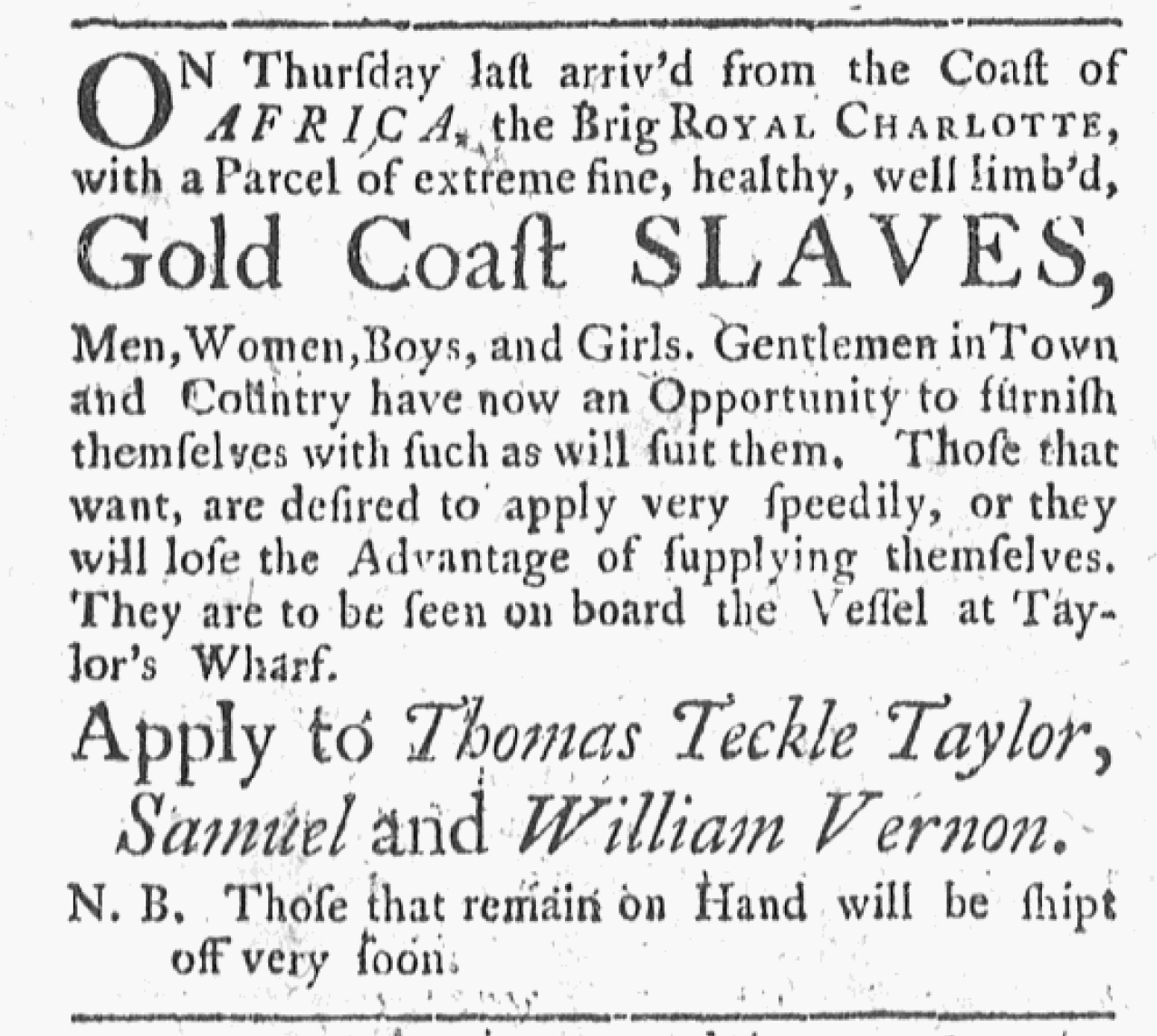
Vernon Slave Advertisement, Newport Mercury, Newport, RI, 1763

== Smuggler and slave trader ==
William and his brother Samuel entered into business together, eventually establishing themselves as prominent merchants. Thomas did not enter into trade with his other siblings. William and Samuel, made a name for themselves successfully by first utilizing the bilateral trade between New England and the West Indies. The Vernons traded regularly between Halifax, Boston, Philadelphia and Georgia, supplying rum, molasses, flour and leather.

In 1737, the Vernons expanded to the triangle trade, otherwise known as the Atlantic slave trade, eventually becoming the most prolific slave traders of Newport. In that year they financed their first ship, the Olive Branch, captained by John Godfrey. Incredible profits were made by purchasing slaves in Africa with rum from the colonies, selling those slaves in the West Indies, and in North America, including Rhode Island. The Vernons then used those profits to purchase molasses from those ports before buying more rum in the colonies, continuing the triangular cycle of trade.

Over the course of sixty years, the Vernons financed well over forty slave voyages to the coasts of West Africa. Beginning in the 1750s, the Vernons became one of the first Newport merchants to sell African slaves directly to the southern colonies, instead of exclusively in the West Indies. Their ships returning from the West Indies offloaded slaves in South Carolina in exchange for barrels of rice destined for markets in New England. However, the Vernons also sold enslaved people to Rhode Island directly from West Africa. Their first sale to the southern colonies was made in Charleston in 1755. The Vernons serve as a perfect example of the pivotal role Rhode Island played in the American slave trade—they had at one time as many as eight vessels engaged in the trade.

The Brig Royal Charlotte, Captain Taylor, arrived here last Thursday from Annamaboa, on the Coast of Africa, after a Passage of 11 Days; by whom we have the affecting Intelligence of the tragical Death of Capt. George Frost, and Mr. Wiliam Grant, his Mate, both of this Town, which was perpetrated by the Slaves on board his Sloop, as she lay at Anchor in the River Gaboone, in the month of November last. Capt. Frost having Occasion either for some Wood or Water, sent two Men and a Negro on Shore for that Purpose, himself, the Mate, and a Negro who belonged to the Vessel, remaining on board; and in the Men's Absence he unfortunately permitted the Slaves, to the Number of about 60, to come upon Deck, who immediately seized him, with the Negro Man, and threw them both overboard. Mr. Grant, at this Time, last sick in the Cabin, unable to rise. Capt. Frost swam up to the Vessel, in order to get on board again; upon which the Slaves threw a Lance at him, which penetrated his Body, where it remained, and with which he attempted to the gain the Shore, but swimming about half the Way, he sunk, and was seen no more. The Negro, who was thrown over with him, had the good Fortune to get safe ashore.-- The Slaves having now the command of the Vessel, they brought the Small Arms, with several Barrels of Powder, upon Deck; and on some Blacks coming off in Canoes to retake the Vessel, the Slaves on board began firing with their Small Arms, but through Ignorance soon set the Powder on Fire, and in the Explosion about 30 of them where destroyed. The Sloop was retaken three Days afterwards, with the most affecting Part this Affair was disclosed, for on entering the Cabin, the Corpse of Mr. Grant was immediately discovered, with his Throat cut in a very shocking Manner, which was supposed to have been done as soon as Capt. Frost and the Negro were thrown over.

— Newport Mercury, June 6, 1763

=== Royal Charlotte ===
One of the more famous vessels of the Vernons was the brig Royal Charlotte. The Royal Charlotte was used in at least two slave voyages to West Africa. Once in 1762, and again in 1767. A report from the Newport Mercury on June 6, 1763, reveals an uprising of enslaved people that happened aboard the 1762 voyage. Following this uprising, Captain Taylor brought the remaining enslaved African peoples to Rhode Island for sale. An advertisement for the cargo describes them as a "Parcel of extreme fine, healthy and well limbed Gold Coast Slaves; Men, Women, Boys and Girls." Clients were encourage to view the cargo on the Royal Charlotte, docked at Taylor's Wharf.

In 1776, the Royal Charlotte was seized by the British in Newport harbor, taken to Boston, and confiscated along with its cargo.

=== Slave voyages of the Vernon family ===
Slave Voyages of the Vernon Family
Year	Vessel Registered	Rig /Vessel Name	Vessel Owner(s)	Captain's Name	Place of Purchase	Place of Landing	Estimated Embarked	Estimated Disembarked
1737	Newport	Olive Branch	William Vernon, Samuel Vernon	John Godfrey			149	126
1754	Newport	Sl. Prince Sherboro	Jacob Rivera, William Vernon	William Brown		Suriname	83	69
1754	Newport	Sl. Hare	Samuel Vernon, William Vernon	Caleb Godfrey	Sierra Leone	Barbados	72	61
1755	Newport	Sl. Hare	William Vernon, Samuel Vernon	Caleb Godfrey	Sierra Leone	Charleston	80	71
1756	Newport	Sh. Cassada Gardens	William Vernon, Jonas Redwood, William Redwood Jr.	Thomas T. Taylor	Anomabu	French Caribbean	205	175
1756	Newport	Snauw Venus	William Vernon, Robert Stevens	William Pinnegar	Cape Mount	Kingston	121	114
1756	Newport	Sl. Titt Bitt	William Vernon, Jonas Redwood, William Redwood Jr.	Thomas Rogers	Gold Coast		83	69
1757	Newport	Sh. Othello	Jonas Redwood, William Redwood Jr., William Vernon	Francis Malbone	Gold Coast	Barbados	286	244
1758	Newport	Snauw Venus	Jonas Redwood, William Redwood Jr., William Vernon	Samuel Johnson	Windward, Ivory, Gold, & Benin	Martinique	150	150
1759	Newport	Br. Marygold	Samuel Vernon, William Vernon, Thomas Taylor	Thomas T. Taylor	Anomabu	St. Croix	135	112
1760		Sh. Cassada Gardens	William Vernon	Thomas T. Taylor			4	3
1762	Newport	Sch. Little Sally	Samuel Vernon, William Vernon, Thomas Taylor	William Taylor	Anomabu	Rhode Island	67	62
1762	Newport	Br. Royal Charlotte	Samuel Vernon, William Vernon, Thomas T. Taylor	William Taylor	Anomabu	Rhode Island	70	61
1762	Newport	Br. Reynard	Samuel Vernon, William Vernon	Peter Dordin	Anomabu	Barbados	182	177
1763	Newport	Sl. Whydah	William Vernon	Thomas Rogers	Cape Coast Castle	Barbados	60	31
1764	Newport	Br. Othello	Samuel Vernon, William Vernon	Thomas Rogers	Iles de Los	Antigua	66	42
1766	Newport	Br. Othello	Samuel Vernon, William Vernon	John Duncan		Virginia	97	87
1767	Newport	Br. Royal Charlotte	William Vernon, Samuel Vernon, Thomas Taylor	William Taylor, William Pinnegar	Anomabu	St. Croix	105	95
1768	Newport	Br. Othello	William Vernon, Samuel Vernon	John Duncan, Goodman Halvorson	Anomabu	James River	85	79
1770	Newport	Br. Othello	Samuel Vernon, William Vernon	John Duncan, John Stanton	Anomabu	Rappahannock	90	87
1771	Newport	Sch. Active	Samuel Vernon, William Vernon, Benjamin Mason	Robert Elliot	Gambia	Barbados	105	82
1772	Newport	Br. Othello	Samuel Vernon, William Vernon	John Duncan			118	103
1772	Newport	Br. Othello	Samuel Vernon, William Vernon	John Duncan	Anomabu	Rappahannock	83	63
1774	Newport	Br. Othello	Samuel Vernon, William Vernon	George Dunbar Sweet	Gambia	Montego Bay	80	75
1784	Newport	Br. Don Galvez	Samuel Brown, William Vernon	Gardner	Anomabu	Charleston	133	127
1785	Newport	Br. Peggy	William Vernon	John Duncan		Trinidad	130	106
1786	Newport and Salem	Br. Don Galvez	Samuel Brown, William Vernon	Grey		Martinique	136	136
1788	Newport	Br. Washington	Constant Tabor, Samuel Vernon, Christopher Ellery	William Gardner	Gold Coast	Martinique	202	165
1788	Newport and Salem	Sh. Pacific	Daniel Gardner, Constant Tabor, William Vernon, Samuel Brown	Daniel Gardner		St. Eustatius	157	140
1791	Newport and Salem	Br. Don Galvez	James Brown, William Vernon	Daniel Gray	Anomabu		120	89
1791	Newport and Salem	Sch. Ascension	Caleb Gardner William Vernon, Peleg Clarke, Samuel Brown	John Stanton	Mozambique	Havana	276	214
1792	Newport and Salem	Br. Don Galvez	James Brown, William Vernon	Grey	Mozambique	St. Estatius	271	251
1793	Newport and Salem	Sh. Ascension	William Vernon, Caleb Gardner, Peleg Clarke, Samuel Brown	Samuel Chace	Mozambique	Havanna	221	197
1795	Newport and Salem	Sh. Ascension	Caleb Gardner, William Vernon, Peleg Clarke, Sam Brown	Samuel Chace	Mozambique	Montevideo	283	250
1799	Boston	Sch. Charlotte	Samuel Brown, William Vernon	William Langston		South Carolina	94	77

== Contributions to the American Revolution ==
William's success in Newport meant he was well known to the British. Samuel and William were both early supporters of the revolution; Samuel was even one of the ringleaders responsible for the Stamp Act Riots of 1765. Their other sibling, Thomas was a Loyalist or Tory sent into a brief exile in Glocester, Rhode Island, but Thomas remained friendly with the brothers throughout the war. As a result of his well-known political beliefs, William was forced to flee Newport prior to the British occupation of Newport in 1776. Vernon fled to Rehoboth, Massachusetts, hoping to protect his family. His nephew remained at the Vernon House to protect it during this time. The Vernon House, located on Clarke Street in Newport, was the headquarters of the Comte de Rochambeau during the revolution, General George Washington and the Marquis de Lafayette both were guests at the Vernon House.

After moving closer to the heart of revolutionary activity, Vernon was appointed by the Continental Congress as the president of the Continental Naval Board on May 6, 1777. This position was effectively the precursor to the Department of the Navy (effectively making Vernon the first Secretary of the Navy, before the position was officially established in the 1790s). In this position, Vernon was responsible for building and outfitting the ships of the Continental Navy for the duration of the American Revolution.

Vernon was extremely dedicated to his duties; on several occasions, he actually contributed some of his own personal wealth to the cause with little chance of collecting interest or even repayment. After the Revolution, Vernon became involved in the Board of the Admiralty before returning to Newport.

=== Cato Vernon ===
On March 17, 1778, one of the African men William Vernon had enslaved, known as Cato Vernon, enlisted in the Rhode Island First Regiment.

== Post-Revolution ==
Following the Revolution, William Vernon continued to expand his activities and influence within the Newport community. He was a president of the Redwood Library, founding member of the Newport Artillery Company in 1741 and a key figure in establishing the Newport Bank in 1803. In 1990, the remaining assets of this bank were purchased by Citizens Bank. William Vernon was an early benefactor of the College of New Jersey (now known as Princeton University). William Vernon and his family continued his Atlantic slave trade activities after the revolution and following his brother Samuel's death in 1792, until at least 1799.

== Death ==
William Vernon is buried in the Vernon Cemetery on Warner Street in Newport, Rhode Island. His house, Vernon House, is a National Historic Landmark.

== Children ==
- Samuel Vernon Jr. (May 29, 1757 – 1834)
  - Husband of Elizabeth Ellery, a daughter of Christopher Ellery. An eminent Newport merchant, and one time its wealthiest citizen. The first president of the Newport Bank, and the president of the Rhode Island Insurance Company. Fought as a volunteer under General John Sullivan at the Battle of Rhode Island in 1778.
- William H. Vernon Jr. (March 6, 1759 – 1833)
  - Graduated from Princeton in 1776. Was for many years the Secretary of the Redwood Library. A Francophile, Vernon frequented the court of Louis XVI in Paris (where he was an aide to Benjamin Franklin) and on the death of his father spent his entire eighty-thousand-dollar inheritance on a collection of fifty-two Old Master paintings, thereby forming one of the first important collections of such works in this country. They hung for many years at Vernon House (which still stands on the corner of Clarke and Mary Streets) and undoubtedly enticed other Newport residents to collect within the same parameters.
  - At one time during the French Revolution, Vernon was recognized as a courtier by the mob, dragged to a lamp-post, and was only rescued from being hanged by a Frenchman who knew him and assured the mob that he was an American citizen.

== See also ==
- Vernon House
- Abraham Redwood
- Aaron Lopez
- List of Rhode Island slave traders
