= Vernon House =

Historic house in Newport, Rhode Island

- U.S. National Register of Historic Places
- U.S. National Historic Landmark
- U.S. National Historic Landmark District – Contributing property
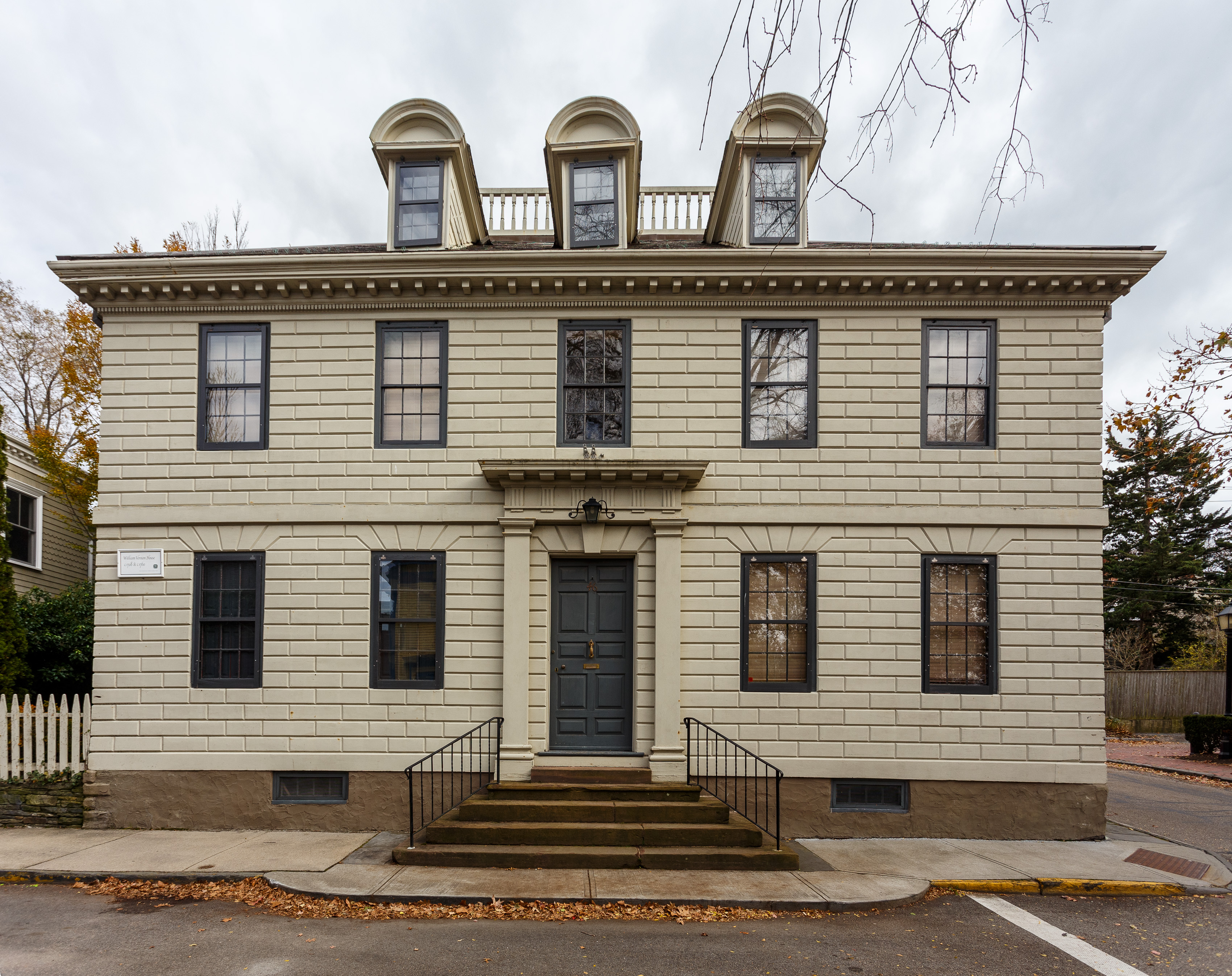

- Location within Rhode Island Location within the United States
- Location: 46 Clarke Street, Newport, Rhode Island
- Coordinates: 41°29′19″N 71°18′50″W
- Area: less than one acre
- Built: 1758
- Architect: Peter Harrison
- Architectural style: Georgian
- Part of: Newport Historic District (ID68000001)
- NRHP reference No.: 68000005

Significant dates
- Added to NRHP: November 24, 1968
- Designated NHL: November 24, 1968
- Designated NHLDCP: November 24, 1968

The Vernon House is a historic house in Newport, Rhode Island built in 1758 for Metcalf Bowler. The house is an architecturally distinguished colonial-era house with a construction history probably dating back to the late 17th century, with alterations made in the 18th century, possibly by architect Peter Harrison. During the American Revolutionary War this house served as the headquarters of the Comte de Rochambeau, commander of the French forces stationed in Newport 1780–1783. The house was designated a National Historic Landmark in 1968.

The house is named after William Vernon, prominent slave trader and figure of the American Revolution, who purchased the home in 1773.

== Description and history ==
The Vernon House is a 2 1/2-story wood-frame structure, with a hip roof topped by a low balustrade. The front and sides of the roof are pierced by dormers; those on the front have segmented-arch pediments, while those on the sides are gabled. Two brick chimneys rise from the interior of the house. The house is five bays wide and four deep, with its entry centered on the main facade. The doorway is flanked by fluted pilasters and topped by an entablature and modillioned cornice, a treatment repeated in simpler form on the secondary entry at the rear. The exterior is clad in rusticated wood coursing carved, treated, and painted to resemble ashlar stone. This emulation extends to the keystone-like lintels above the windows of the first floor on the main facade, and in a simulated belt course between the first and second floors. This peculiar method of rustication is an original feature of the Redwood Library, built in 1750 by the distinguished architect Peter Harrison. It's likely that Harrison was the architect for the home.

The interior is roughly as it was after alterations made in 1759, with a central hall and two rooms on either side. The central hall has elegant woodwork, with an arch supported by large consoles, paneled wainscoting, and a dentillated cornice, details which are echoed in the second floor hall. The public downstairs rooms feature similar woodwork, with elaborate mantelpieces. The plasterwork in the northwest room feature a period mural, depicting the Chinese court punishments and the Buddhist cycle of hell. The second-story room was documented in 1879 to have artwork depicting the West Indies on its walls, but this work has been lost.

Most of the building's appearance is due to an extensive alteration to an older structure in 1759, and represents the finest rendition of academic Georgian architecture in the city. The older structure, based on architectural evidence, is surmised to have been built around the turn of the 18th century. William Gibbs, a painter, is documented to have owned the house in 1708, and it remained in his family until 1744. In 1759 Charles Bowler sold the property to his son Metcalf, a merchant and justice of the colonial supreme court. The enlargement of the original building to its present size was probably done shortly after the younger Bowler's purchase. Bowler, who is best known for being revealed as a British spy in the 20th century, sold the house in 1773 to another merchant, William Vernon. When French forces arrived at Newport in 1780 during the American Revolutionary War, Vernon offered his house to their commander, the Comte de Rochambeau.

The Vernon family retained ownership of the property until 1872. In 1912 it was purchased by a charitable organization to rescue it from demolition, and performed a partial restoration. It served as headquarters of the Family Service Society until 1966, when it was sold into private hands.

The house was declared a National Historic Landmark and listed on the National Register of Historic Places in 1968.

== Gallery ==
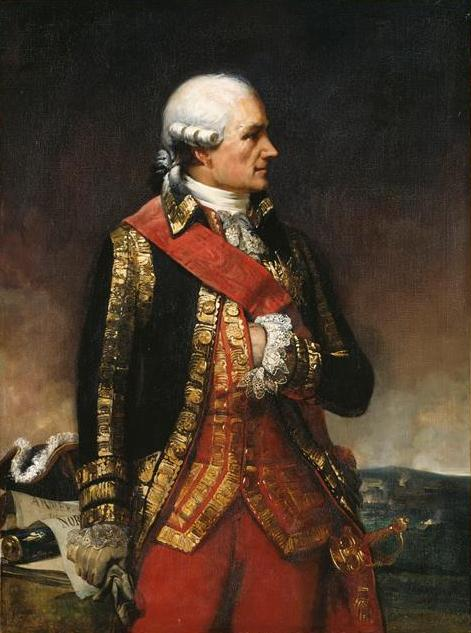
The Comte de Rochambeau used the house as headquarters

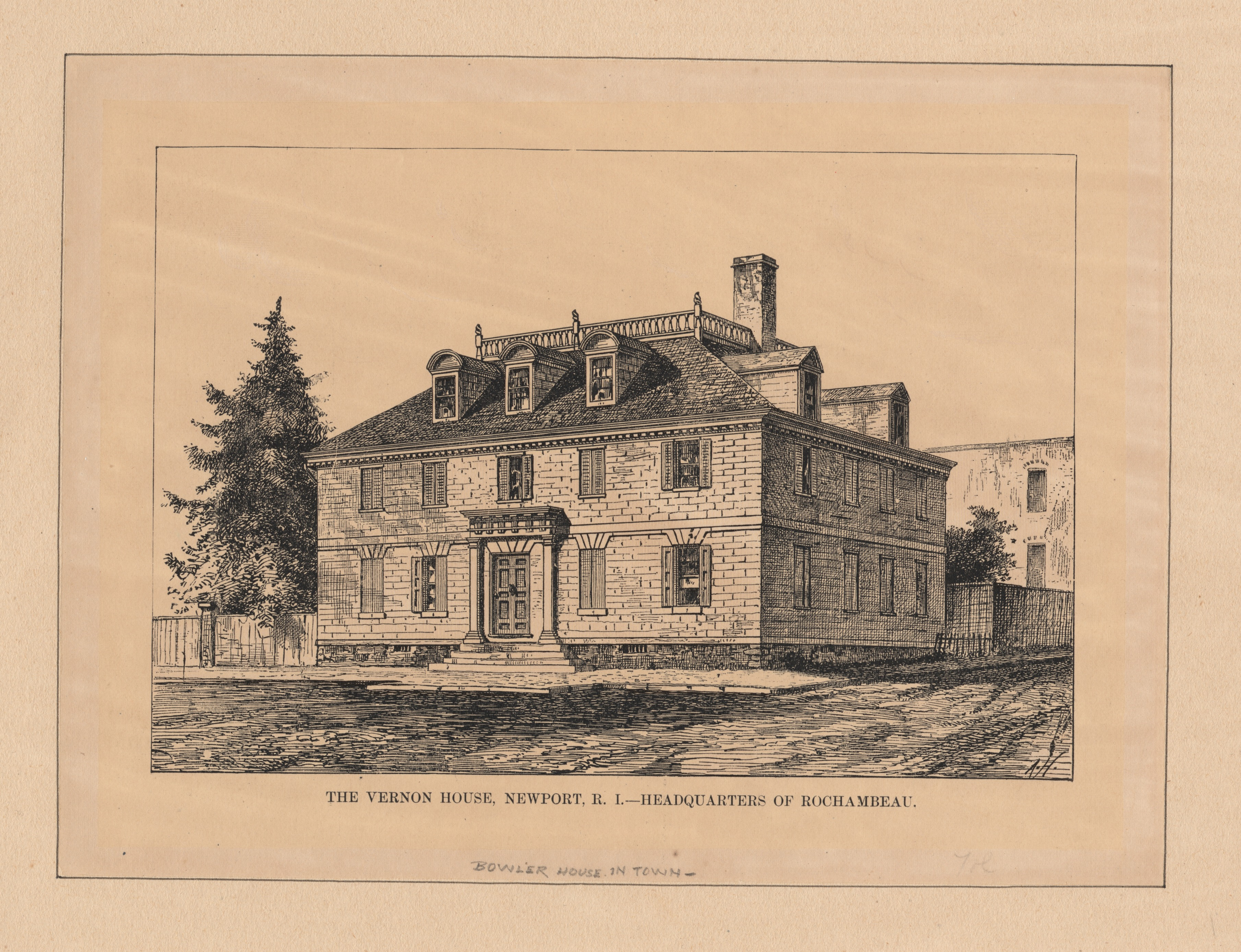
Vernon House

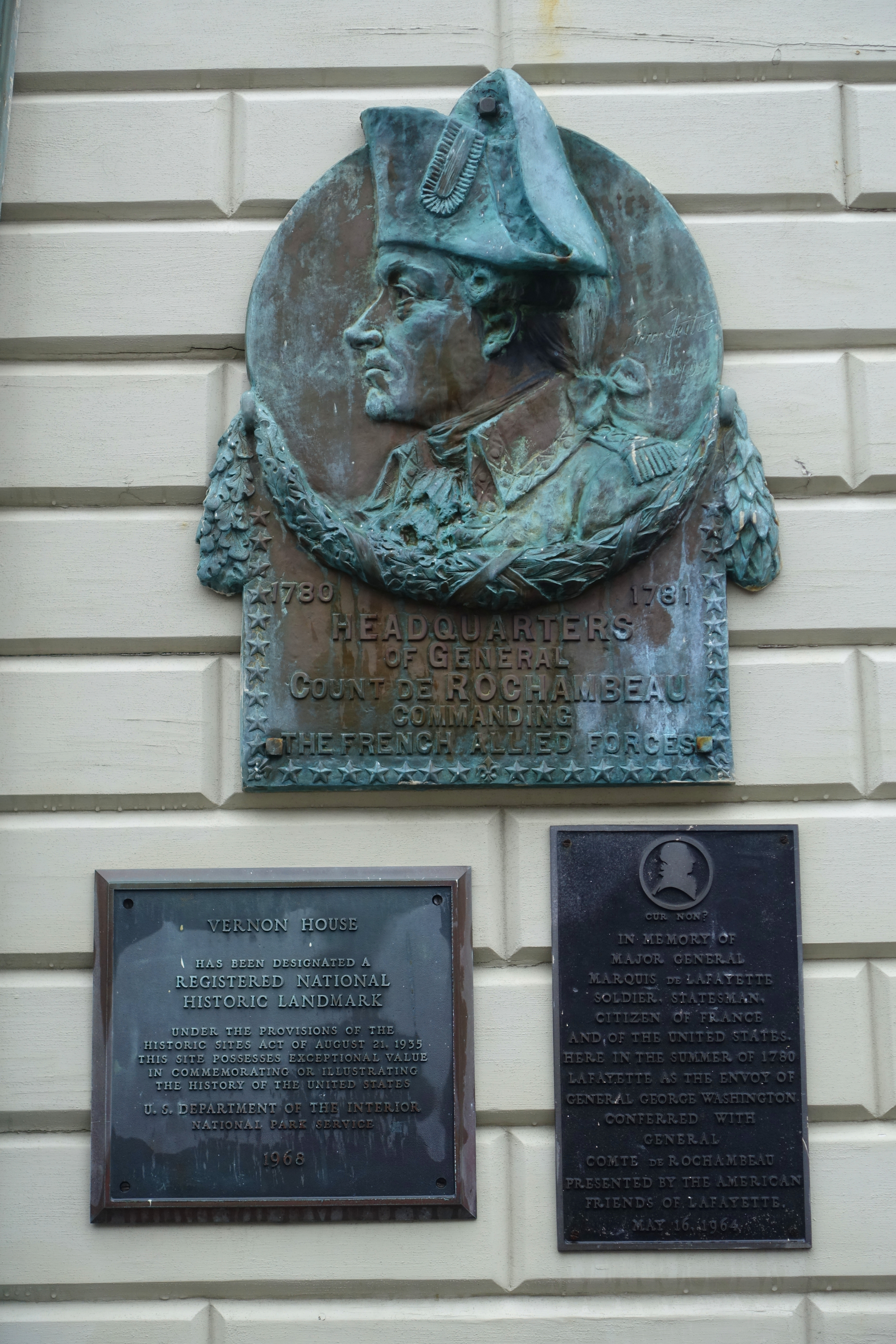
Rochambeau and Lafayette markers

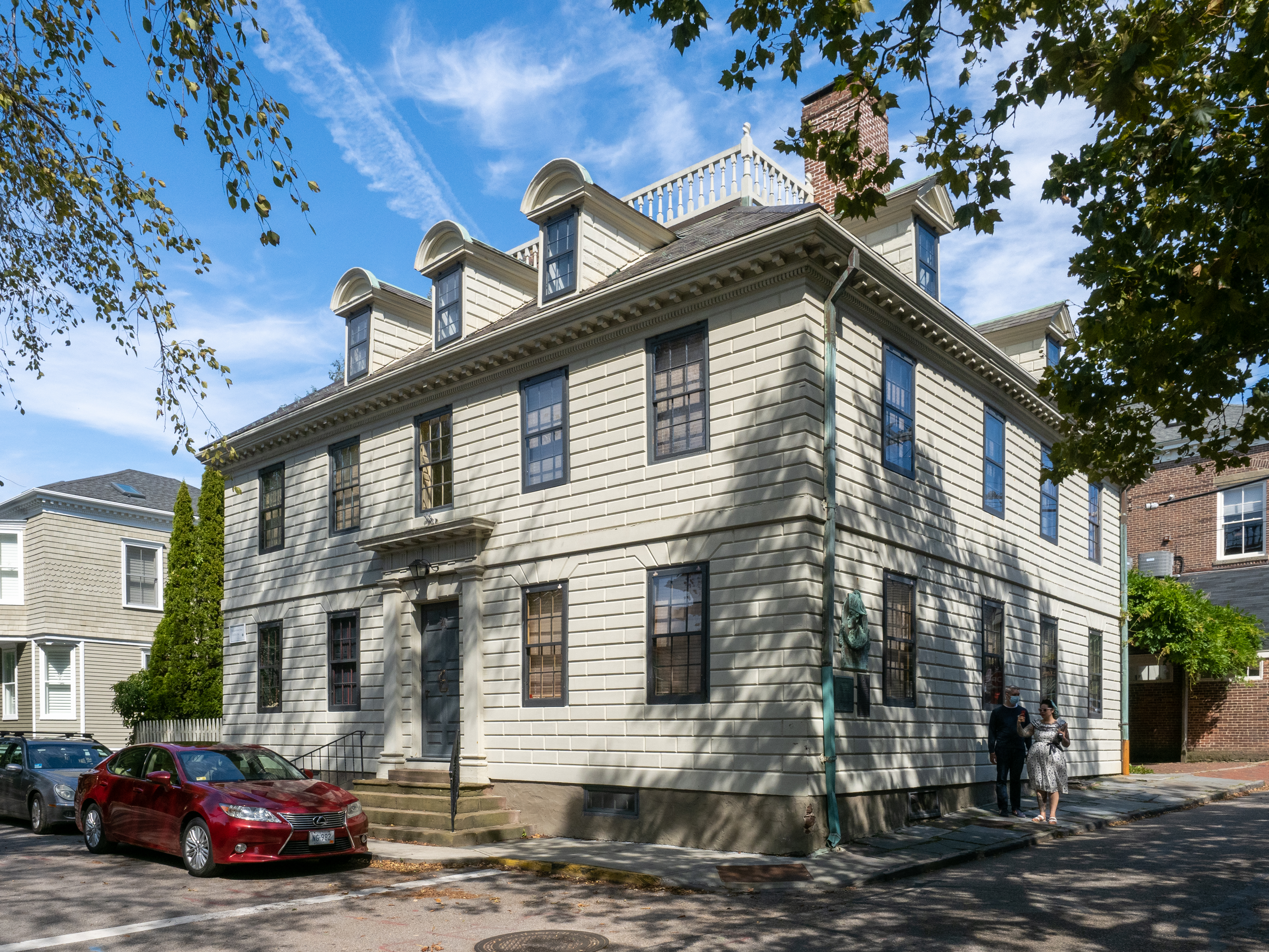

== See also ==
- List of National Historic Landmarks in Rhode Island
- National Register of Historic Places listings in Newport County, Rhode Island
