= James German =

Member of the Texas House of Representatives from the 11th district
- In office January 13, 1874 – April 18, 1876

Personal details
- Born: May 8, 1835 Versailles, Missouri, United States
- Died: April 19, 1913 (aged 77)
- Political party: Democratic Party
- Relatives: William Silas Vernon (son-in-law)

James Lafayette German was an American politician who served in the Texas House of Representatives from January 1874 to April 1876.

== Biography ==
James Lafayette German was born on May 8, 1835, near Versailles, Missouri, to Zacheus German and Nancy Webb. He attended private school until he began teaching at 15. In 1861 he attended the University of Missouri, but he joined the Confederate State of America's Army at the start of the American Civil War. He reached the rank of adjutant general under Sterling Price and was wounded at the Battle of Pea Ridge. After the war he moved to Kentucky Town, Texas, to work as a teacher. He married a former student, Eliza Paxton, on January 9, 1870. The couple had eleven children. One of his daughters, Clara P. German, married William Silas Vernon.

German supported prohibition and was elected to the 14th Texas Legislature representing the 11th district. He served in the Texas House of Representatives from January 13, 1874, to April 18, 1876, as a member of the Democratic Party. He was also a delegate to the 1875 Texas Constitutional Convention. He died on April 19, 1913.
