= Nicholas Geffroy =

American silversmith and watchmaker

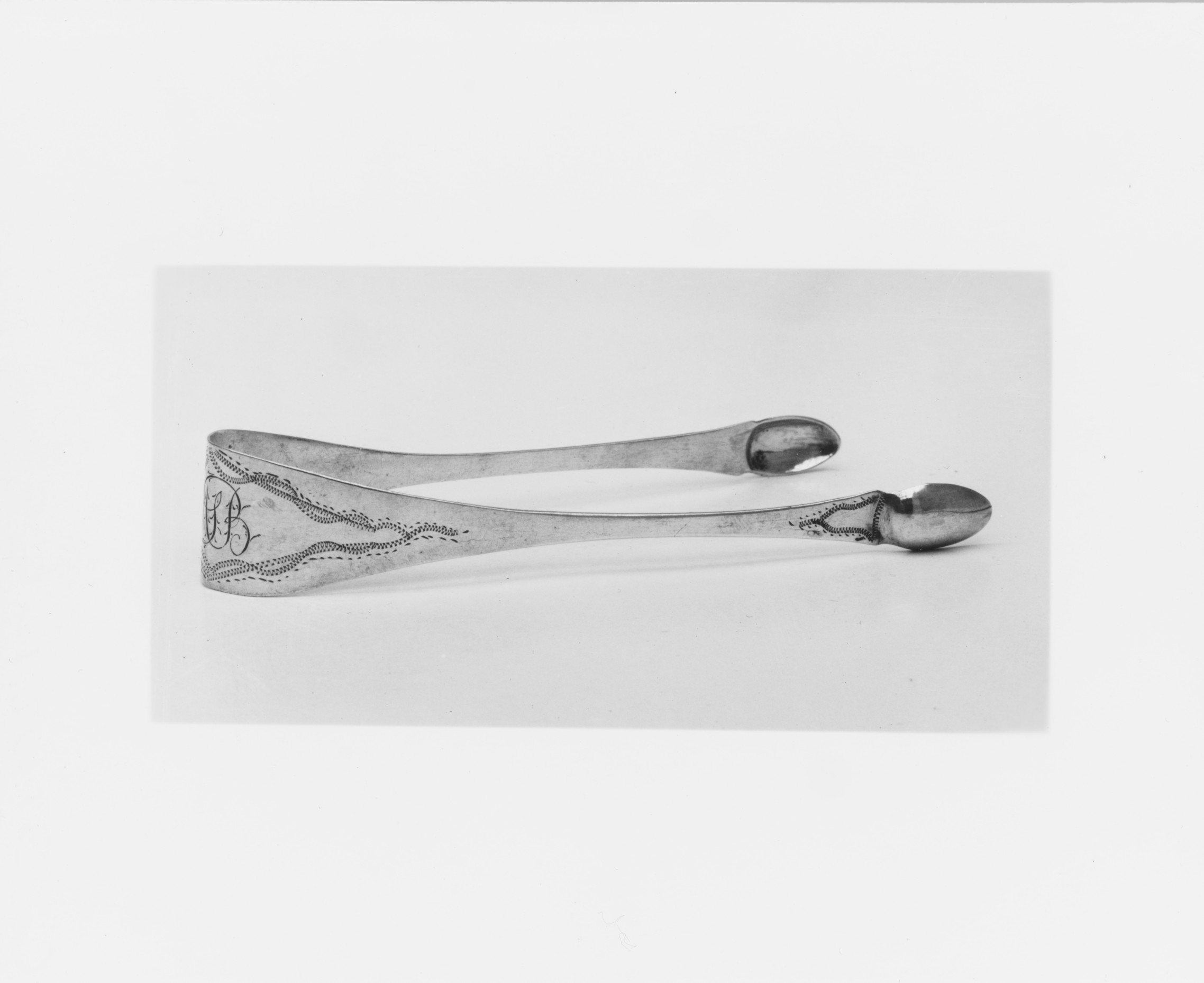
Tongs by Nicholas Geffroy, circa 1795

Nicholas Geffroy (c. 1761 - before February 9, 1839) was an American silversmith and watchmaker, active in Newport, Rhode Island.

Geffroy was born in Granville, Manche in France. He married Sarah Shaw in Newport on September 29, 1795, and before 1802 became a partner with her father, John Allen Shaw, as JOHN A. SHAW & Co. In June 1817 he was appointed Newport's Surveyor of Highways.

In a curious incident in 1801, a letter to President Thomas Jefferson was sent from someone purporting to be Geffroy. The letter detailed accusations against many citizens and office-holders, and insisted that "A purification is necessary, & we cannot be purified unless you cleanse the Augean Stable completely." Geffroy received a response from Jefferson, but doubted its authenticity and denied having ever written to the President. The United States Senator Christopher Ellery, a local resident, vouched for its authenticity and apparently impounded the letter for return to Jefferson. Ellery in turn accused Congressman John Rutledge Jr. of South Carolina, also then resident in Newport, of having forged this and another letter from Geffroy. These "Geffroy letters" were subsequently published in the Newport Rhode-Island Republican on September 18, 1802, under the headline "Rutledge's Letters To the President of the United States." As noted in that article, although Geffroy possessed some mastery of spoken English, it was doubted that he could write, "with any degree of correctness, a single sentence of the language." After a flurry of accusations and affidavits, Rutledge challenged Ellery to a duel, which he declined. Rutledge assaulted Ellery in January 1803, "publicly caning him and pulling him by the nose and ears". Although Rutledge vehemently maintained his innocence in the affair, he decided not to seek reelection in 1803 given the negative publicity.

In another curious incident recorded by Channing, "a sudden and most malignant disease appeared in the house of Mr. Nicholas Geffroy... supposed to have originated from some foul substances thrown upon the ground occupied by Mr. Geffroy." Several of Geffroy's mechanics died within a few hours of being attacked, but the illness did not spread beyond a few houses on either side of Geffroy.

Geffroy's work is collected in the Metropolitan Museum of Art and Yale University Art Gallery.
