= John Rutledge Jr. =

American politician

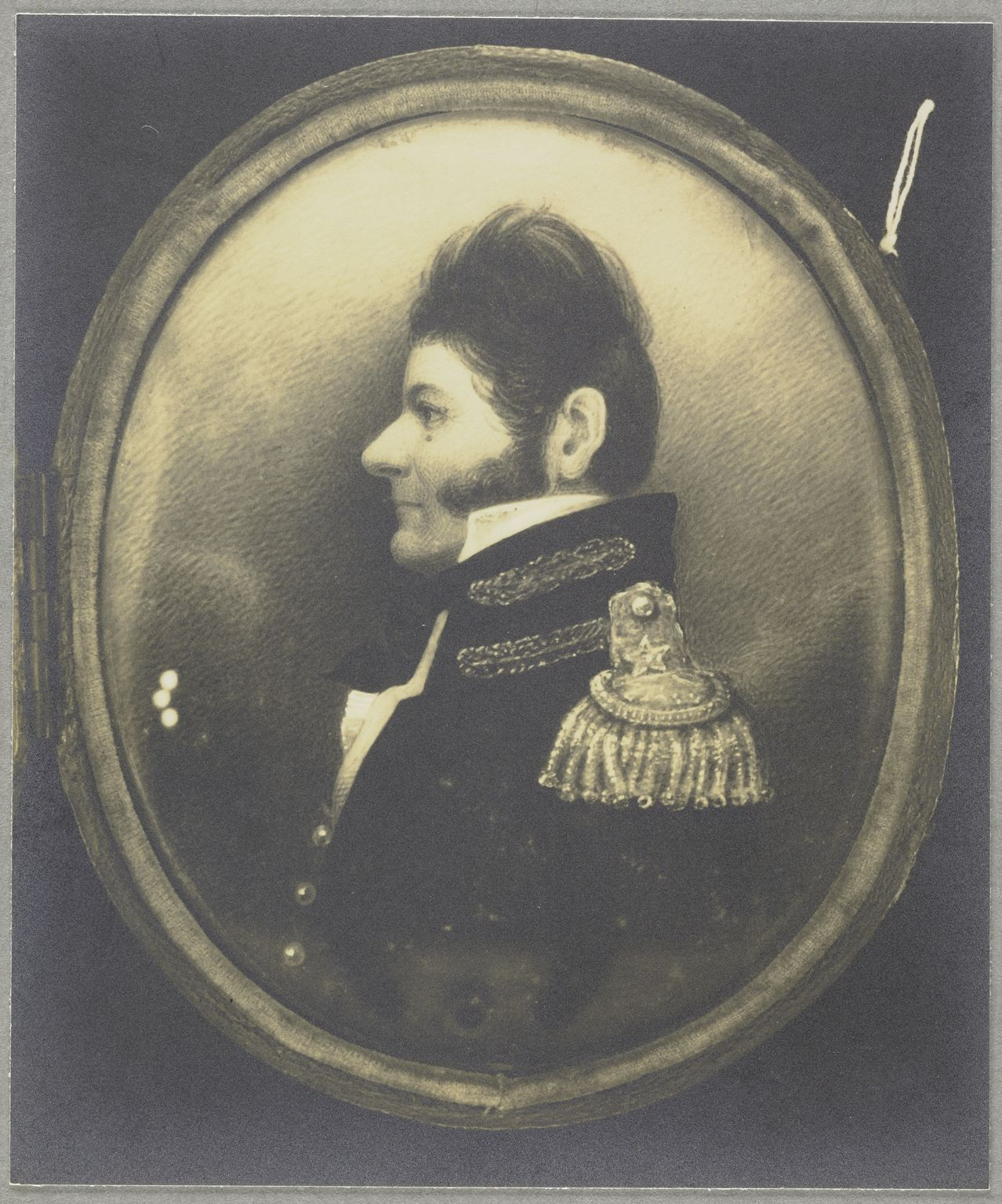

Member of the U.S. House of Representatives from South Carolina's 2nd district
- In office March 4, 1797 – March 3, 1803
- Preceded by: Wade Hampton I
- Succeeded by: William Butler

Member of the South Carolina House of Representatives from St. Peter's Parish
- In office November 24, 1794 – March 3, 1797

Personal details
- Born: c. 1766 Charles Town, Province of South Carolina, British America
- Died: September 1, 1819 (aged 52–53) Philadelphia, Pennsylvania, U.S.
- Party: Federalist
- Spouse: Sarah Motte Smith
- Profession: Planter, soldier

Military service
- Allegiance: United States of America
- Branch/service: South Carolina Militia
- Years of service: 1799 – 1819
- Rank: Major
- Commands: Seventh Brigade, South Carolina Militia
- Battles/wars: War of 1812

John Rutledge Jr. (c. 1766 – September 1, 1819) was an American politician and United States representative from South Carolina's 2nd congressional district.

Rutledge was born in Charles Town in the Province of South Carolina. He was a son of John Rutledge, who was President of South Carolina, Governor of South Carolina, a Continental Congressman, Philadelphia Convention Framer of the United States Constitution, and Chief Justice of the Supreme Court of the United States. John Rutledge was also a nephew of Edward Rutledge, another Continental Congressman from South Carolina. The younger John received private instruction and also attended school in Charleston and Philadelphia. He studied law with his father, was admitted to the bar c. 1787 and practiced in Charles Town. He also engaged as a planter.

From 1794 to 1797, he was a member of the South Carolina House of Representatives. He was an unsuccessful candidate for election in 1794 to the Fourth Congress, and was elected as a Federalist to the Fifth, Sixth, and Seventh Congresses, serving from March 4, 1797, to March 3, 1803. He was an unsuccessful candidate for election to the Thirteenth Congress, and commanded a company of the Twenty-eighth Regiment, South Carolina Militia, in 1799. In 1801, he was the Federalist nominee in a special election for the U.S. Senate, losing to Thomas Sumter. He was promoted to major and in 1804 succeeded to the command of the regiment and served as its commander in the War of 1812. He commanded the Seventh Brigade from 1816 until his death in Philadelphia.

On December 26, 1792, he married Sarah Motte Smith, daughter of the Right Reverend Robert Smith (1732 – 1801). Together, they had seven children. In 1804, he caught his wife in an illicit affair with Dr. Horace Senter. He mortally wounded Dr. Senter in a duel. He and Sarah Motte signed articles of separation in 1809 and lived apart for the remainder of their lives.

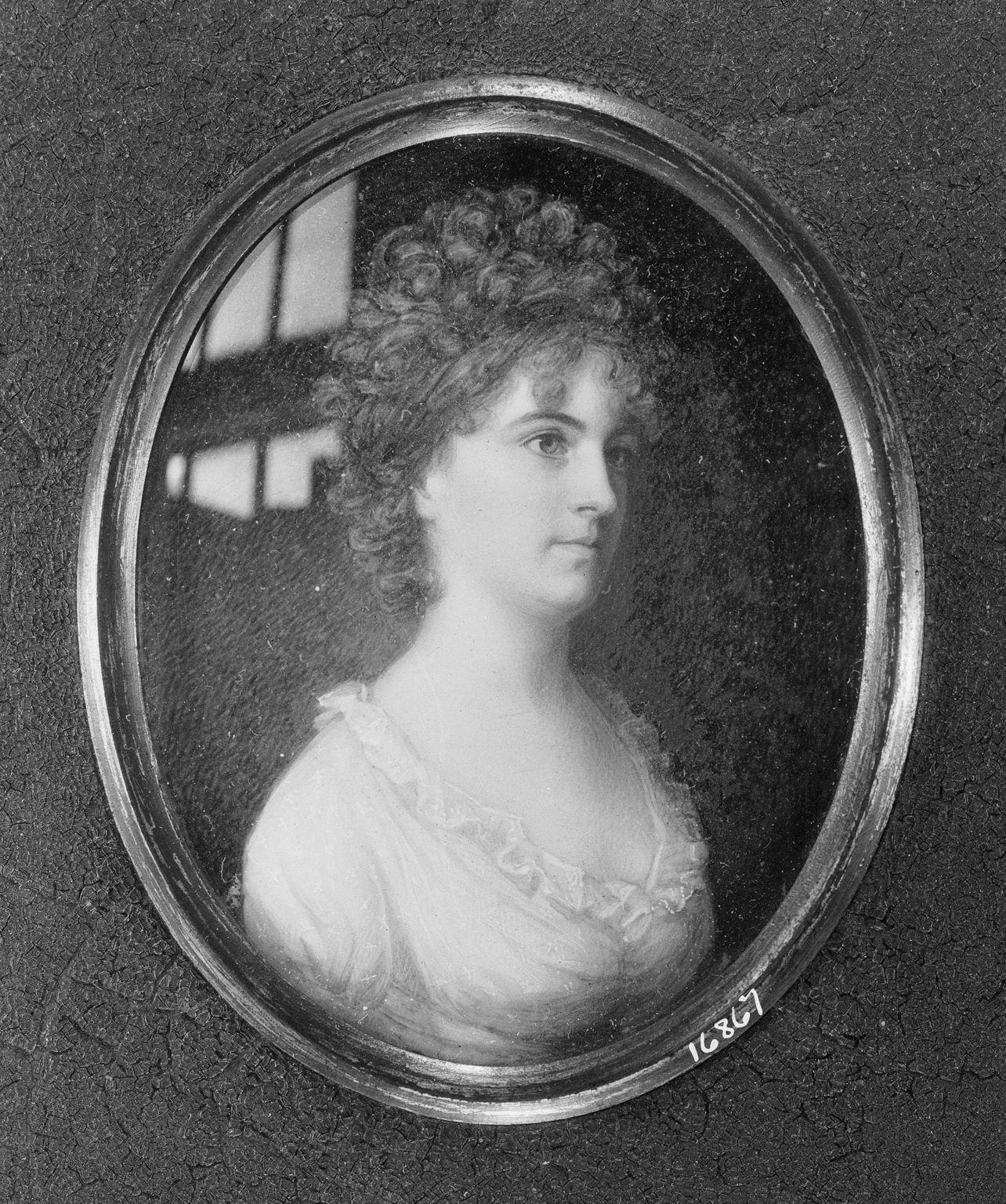
Sarah Motte Smith

In a curious incident in 1801, a letter to President Thomas Jefferson was sent from someone purporting to be Nicholas Geffroy, a silversmith in Newport, Rhode Island. The letter detailed accusations against many citizens and office-holders, and insisted that "A purification is necessary, & we cannot be purified unless you cleanse the Augean Stable completely." Geffroy received a response from Jefferson, but doubted its authenticity and denied having ever written to the President. The United States Senator Christopher Ellery, a local resident, vouched for its authenticity and apparently impounded the letter for return to Jefferson. Ellery in turn accused Rutledge, also then resident in Newport, of having forged this and another letter from Geffroy. These "Geffroy letters" were subsequently published in the Newport Rhode-Island Republican on September 18, 1802, under the headline "Rutledge's Letters To the President of the United States." As noted in that article, although Geffroy possessed some mastery of spoken English, it was doubted that he could write, "with any degree of correctness, a single sentence of the language." After a flurry of accusations and affidavits, Rutledge challenged Ellery to a duel, which he declined. Rutledge assaulted Ellery in January 1803, "publicly caning him and pulling him by the nose and ears". Although Rutledge vehemently maintained his innocence in the affair, he decided not to seek reelection in 1803 given the negative publicity.

== Notes ==
U.S. House of Representatives
Preceded by Wade Hampton I	Member of the U.S. House of Representatives from South Carolina's 2nd congressional district 1797-1803	Succeeded by William Butler
