= William Silas Vernon =

Member of the Oklahoma House of Representatives from the Wagoner County district
- In office 1923–1924
- Preceded by: W. T. Drake
- Succeeded by: Horace S. Foster

Personal details
- Born: October 11, 1871 Fayetteville, Arkansas, United States
- Died: October 16, 1929 (aged 58)
- Party: Democratic Party
- Spouse: Clara P. German (m. 1895)
- Children: 3

William Silas Vernon was an American politician who served in the Oklahoma House of Representatives from 1923 to 1924.

== Biography ==
William Silas Vernon was born on October 11, 1871, in Fayetteville, Arkansas, to James A. Vernon and Woodson Alexander Vernon. He attended school in Texas and graduated from Grayson College in Whiteright, Texas, in 1884. He was later admitted to the bar and served as Mayor of Whiteright. On December 26, 1895, he married Clara P. German, the daughter of Texas state legislator James German, and the couple had three childre.

In 1906, he moved to Coweta, Indian Territory (then part of the Muscogee Nation), and founded the First National bank of Coweta. In 1923 and 1924, he served in the 9th Oklahoma Legislature representing Wagoner County in the Oklahoma House of Representatives. A member of the Democratic Party, he was preceded in office by W. T. Drake and succeeded by Horace S. Foster. He was a member of the Ku Klux Klan and supporter of the impeachment of Gov. Jack C. Walton.

He died on October 16, 1929.
