= Kay Kimbell =

Kay Kimbell (June 15, 1886 in Leon County, Texas – April 13, 1964 in Fort Worth, Texas) was an entrepreneur and philanthropist, especially as benefactor of the Kimbell Art Museum.

Born to Benjamin B. and Mattie (Jones) Kimbell, he attended the public schools in Whitewright, Texas, but quit school in the eighth grade to work as an office boy in a grain-milling company there, where he later founded the Beatrice Milling Company. This firm grew into Kimbell Milling Company, the pilot organization of diverse interests that Kimbell later founded or directed.

At the time of his death he was the head of more than seventy corporations, including flour, feed, and oil mills, grocery chains (Buddies, sold to Winn-Dixie but later closed when the chain left the DFW market), an insurance company, and a wholesale grocery firm. In addition to pursuing business interests, Kimbell collected art.

He established the Kimbell Art Foundation in Fort Worth, Texas in 1935 and at his death left his fortune to the foundation, with directions to build a museum of the first class in Fort Worth. The collection of art that Kimbell and his wife amassed included many fine works by late Renaissance, French nineteenth-century, and American nineteenth-century artists, with a special emphasis on eighteenth-century English painters such as Reynolds and Gainsborough.

The Kimbells' home in Fort Worth was often visited by touring groups before the museum was completed, and a great many of the works in their collection were continuously on loan to area colleges and universities, libraries, and churches.

Kimbell married Velma Fuller on December 24, 1910; they had no children. Kimbell died on April 13, 1964, in Fort Worth, aged 77, and was buried in Whitewright, but was later re-interred in Fort Worth.
