= Grayson College (1887–1912) =

College in Whitewright, Texas, U.S.

Grayson College operated from 1887 to 1912 in Whitewright in southeastern Grayson County, Texas. It is not to be confused with Grayson College, located in Denison, which was founded in 1965.

The second building to house Grayson College. It was destroyed by a fire in 1904.

== History ==
Grayson College was chartered in 1887. Originally housed in a wooden two-story structure in downtown Whitewright, the college soon relocated to a new addition on the north side of town.

By 1904, enrollment had reached its highest level. That same year, a fire in the college's chemistry lab destroyed the lab, the library and the main building. In 1905, the college had rebuilt, but students and faculty had dispersed to other areas and enrollment from 1905 to the college's closure in 1912 never again reached the 1904 peak.

In 1914, James M. Carlisle from Arlington, Texas, opened the Carlisle Military Academy in the Grayson College building. It closed in 1917, and in 1918, Whitewright purchased the campus and moved the high school to the location.

The school district discontinued use of the main building in 1975, though other buildings and new additions were still in use. In 1976, the main college building was demolished. The college's bell is now located at the Whitewright High School campus.

== Notable alumni ==
- George Washington Truett — Clergyman
