= Christopher Ellery =

American politician

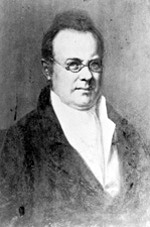

United States Senator from Rhode Island
- In office May 16, 1801 – March 3, 1805
- Preceded by: Ray Greene
- Succeeded by: James Fenner

Personal details
- Born: November 1, 1768 Newport, Rhode Island
- Died: December 2, 1840 (aged 72) Middletown, Rhode Island
- Party: Democratic-Republican

Christopher Ellery (November 1, 1768 – December 2, 1840) was a United States senator from Rhode Island. Born in Newport, he graduated from Yale College in 1787, studied law, was admitted to the bar and commenced practice in Newport. He was clerk of the superior court of Newport County from 1794 to 1798.

== Early life and family ==
Christopher Ellery was a nephew of William Ellery, a Continental Congressman from Rhode Island. In 1784, his daughter, Betsy, married Samuel Vernon.

== Slave voyage ==
In 1788, Ellery financed a slave voyage aboard the brig Washington with Constant Tabor and prominent Newport slave trader Samuel Vernon, his son in law. The captain, William Gardner, purchased 200 enslaved Africans from the Gold Coast and then sailed to Martinique where he sold 165 people. Thus, 35 may have died on the voyage through the Middle Passage.

== Election history ==
Ellery was elected as a Democratic-Republican to the U.S. Senate to fill the vacancy caused by the resignation of Ray Greene and served from May 16, 1801, to March 3, 1805. He was defeated for reelection in 1804 by James Fenner, the son of the Governor. Ellery was appointed by President Thomas Jefferson as United States commissioner of loans at Providence in 1806, and was appointed collector of customs at Newport, succeeding his uncle, holding that office from 1820 to 1834.

== The Geffroy letters ==
In a curious incident in 1801, a letter to President Thomas Jefferson was sent from someone purporting to be Nicholas Geffroy, a silversmith in Newport, Rhode Island. The letter detailed accusations against many citizens and office-holders, and insisted that "A purification is necessary, & we cannot be purified unless you cleanse the Augean Stable completely." Geffroy received a response from Jefferson, but doubted its authenticity and denied having ever written to the President.

Rhode Island Republican, September 18, 1802

Christopher Ellery, a local resident, vouched for its authenticity and apparently impounded the letter for return to Jefferson. He then accused Congressman John Rutledge Jr. of South Carolina, also then resident in Newport, of having forged this and another letter from Geffroy. These "Geffroy letters" were subsequently published in the Newport Rhode-Island Republican on September 18, 1802, under the headline "Rutledge's Letters To the President of the United States." As noted in that article, although Geffroy possessed some mastery of spoken English, it was doubted that he could write, "with any degree of correctness, a single sentence of the language." After a flurry of accusations and affidavits, Rutledge challenged Ellery to a duel, which he declined.

Rutledge assaulted Ellery in January 1803, "publicly caning him and pulling him by the nose and ears". Although Rutledge vehemently maintained his innocence in the affair, he decided not to seek reelection in 1803 given the negative publicity.

== Death ==
Christopher Ellery died in Middletown in 1840. He was buried in Common Burying Ground and Island Cemetery in Newport.

U.S. Senate
| Preceded by Ray Greene | U.S. senator (Class 2) from Rhode Island; 1801–1805; Served alongside: Theodore Foster, Samuel J. Potter, Benjamin Howland | Succeeded by James Fenner |
