= Abraham Redwood =

Merchant and philanthropist (1709–1788)

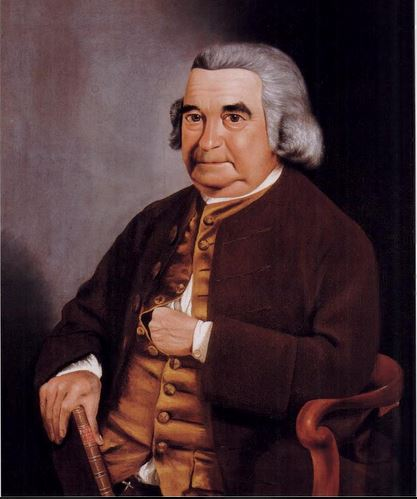
- Abraham Redwood, 1790
- Born: February 15, 1709; Antigua, British West Indies
- Died: March 7, 1788 (aged 79); Newport, Rhode Island, United States
- Occupations: Merchant, philanthropist, plantation owner, slave trader,
- Known for: Redwood Library

Abraham Redwood (February 15, 1709 – March 7, 1788) was a West Indies merchant, philanthropist, plantation owner, and slave trader from Newport, Rhode Island. He is the namesake of the Redwood Library and Athenaeum, one of the oldest libraries in the United States. Redwood was President of the Redwood Library and Athenaeum from its founding in 1747 to 1788.

== Early life and education ==
Abraham Redwood Jr. was born on Antigua on February 15, 1709, at his father's plantation, Cassada Garden. Abraham Redwood Sr. was born in Bristol, England in 1665. In 1687, Redwood Sr. went to the island of Antigua, where he married Mehitable Langford, only daughter of Jonas Langford. Through this marriage, Redwood Sr. took possession of the sugar plantation known as Cassada Garden which had "a great number of slaves." Abraham Redwood Jr. was the third son of fifteen children. Redwood Sr. remained in Antigua until 1712, when he moved with his family to Salem, Massachusetts. His first wife, Mehitable, died in 1715. Until his death in 1729, Redwood Sr. traveled between homes in Antigua, Salem and Newport, Rhode Island.

Abraham Redwood Jr. was likely educated by the Society of Friends in Philadelphia. On October 27, 1724, his older brother Jonas was thrown from his horse and killed in Newport. Upon the death of his elder brother, Abraham came into the possession of the family sugar plantation in Antigua, Cassada Garden. In 1727, Redwood Jr. purchased land on Aquidneck Island, and on November 2, 1743, he purchased a country estate five miles north of Newport in Portsmouth. Prior to 1728, he married Martha Coggeshall, of Newport, a descendant of John Coggeshall, one of the founders of the Colony of Rhode Island and Providence Plantations. Together Martha and Abraham had six children.

Redwood's botanical garden on his Portsmouth estate was known for its various curious foreign and indigenous plants. He ordered orange and fig trees, and adolescent guava and pineapple plants from the West Indies to fill his garden. Solomon Drowne wrote in 1767 that the garden was rumored to cost over forty thousand pounds, and that the gardener, Charles Dunham, received over one hundred dollars annual salary.

== Cassada Garden ==
During a voyage from Bristol to Antigua in 1687, Abraham Redwood Sr. married Mehitable Langford, the daughter of a wealthy planter named Jonas Langford. Soon after his marriage, Redwood Sr. inherited the sugar cane plantation named Cassada Garden. Redwood Sr.'s oldest son, William, died in 1712 at the age of sixteen, and his second son, Jonas, was thrown from his horse in 1724, at the age of eighteen. Thus the third son, Abraham Redwood Jr., became the oldest living heir, and sometime after 1724, he inherited the estate of Cassada Garden. The plantation brought Redwood an income between two and three thousand pounds a year.

== Merchant and slave trader ==
Both Abraham Redwood Sr. and Abraham Redwood Jr. were devout Quakers. Though their faith had questioned the Atlantic slave trade since 1716, and the Religious Society of Friends did not formally forbid the importing of slaves until 1761.

In 1736, a sudden drop in the price of sugar in London threatened Redwood with bankruptcy. In response to his personal financial crisis, Redwood expanded his enterprise to include slave trading, becoming among the first of Newport's leading merchants to enter the slave trade. In 1737, he financed a voyage to West Africa on his snauw Martha and Jane. Though that voyage failed, Redwood financed two more voyages on the Martha and Jane, one in 1738 and another in 1740. Each of these voyages traveled from Newport, Rhode Island to the Gold Coast and ended in St. John's, Antigua—the site of Redwood's sugar plantation, Cassada Garden. In all, Redwood may have personally financed the trafficking of over three hundred people from the region of West Africa.

Redwood's 1740 slave voyage was his last one on record. However, his younger half-brother, William (1726–1815), and his son, Jonas (1730–1779), financed four more voyages with William Vernon between 1756 and 1759. The ship used for their 1757 voyage was named Cassada Garden, after the family sugar plantation. These voyages trafficked an additional five hundred people into the Atlantic slave trade.

Slave Voyages of the Redwood Family
| Year | Vessel registered | Rig of vessel | Vessel name | Vessel owner | Captain's name | Place of purchase | Place of landing | Total slaves |
|---|---|---|---|---|---|---|---|---|
| 1737 | | Snauw | Martha and Jane | | Francis Pope | | | |
| 1738 | Newport | Snauw | Martha and Jane | Abraham Redwood | | | Antigua | |
| 1740 | Newport | Snauw | Martha and Jane | Abraham Redwood | Francis Pope | Gold Coast | Antigua | |
| 1756 | Newport | Ship | Cassada Garden | William Vernon, Jonas Redwood, William Redwood | Thomas Teackle Taylor | Anomabu | French Caribbean | 175 |
| 1756 | Newport | Sloop | Titt Bitt | William Vernon, Jonas Redwood, William Redwood | Thomas Rogers | Gold Coast | | |
| 1757 | Newport | Ship | Othello | William Vernon, Jonas Redwood, William Redwood | Francis Malbone | Gold Coast | Barbados | 244 |
| 1759 | Newport | Snauw | Venus | Jonas Redwood, William Redwood, William Vernon | Samuel Johnson | Windward, Ivory, Gold, & Benin | Martinique | 150 |

== Philanthropy ==
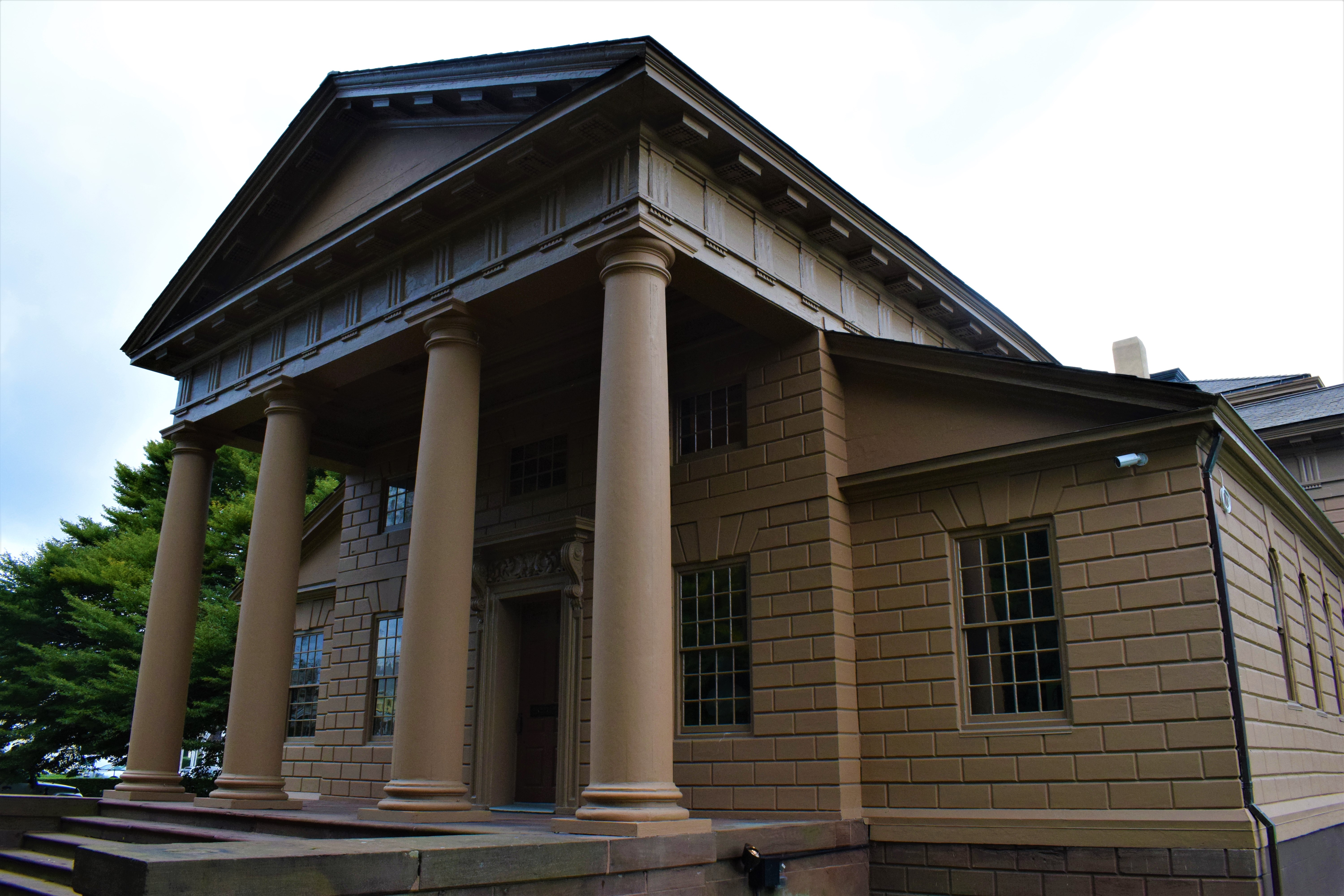
Redwood Library and Athenaeum, Newport, Rhode Island

Of his legacy, it was said of Redwood that "[h]is munificence [...] took so wide a range as to rank him with the Harvards, Yales, and Berkeleys."

Following his donation of five hundred pounds sterling to fund the library's original book collection, on August 22, 1747, an act of the Rhode Island General Assembly incorporated the Redwood Library. Redwood's donation purchased over one thousand three hundred volumes for the new library. Several other prominent slave owners appear on the original list of forty-six proprietors, including William Vernon and Simon Pease.

In 1769, Abraham Redwood was the largest subscriber of a group advocating for the placement in Newport of a newly formed Rhode Island college. Greater subscriptions were raised by a Providence group for the same purpose, which fixed its location there. The college would later become known as Brown University.

== Slave owner ==
The 1774 Census of Newport, Rhode Island records two presumably free African householders with the surname Redwood, Cuff Redwood and Phillies Redwood. Scipio and Oliver, two enslaved Africans Redwood kept on his plantation in Antigua, were burned at the stake for suspected involvement in a conspiracy to start a slave revolt in 1736.

In 1775, the Society of Friends of Rhode Island, believing slavery and the Atlantic slave trade to be unchristian, formally asked Redwood to free the people he had enslaved. Redwood refused, and the Quakers disowned him. Redwood's biographer, Gladys Bolhouse, writes that Redwood, now sixty years old, believed his "whole livelihood as well as the inheritance of his sons depended on the plantation and the plantation could not be run without slaves."

Upon his death, Redwood transferred the ownership of slaves in Newport and Antigua to his children and grandchildren. On the 1774 Census of Newport, Redwood has three enslaved people living in his home. An inventory of his Cassada Garden in Antigua showed that he owned two hundred and thirty-eight slaves. In total, Redwood owned well over two hundred enslaved people, making him, at the time of his death, the largest slave owner living in the city of Newport.

== Death ==
In 1788, Abraham Redwood died at the age of seventy-nine. Redwood is buried in the Coggeshall Burial Ground in Newport, Rhode Island.

== See also ==
- Aaron Lopez
- William Vernon
