= George Washington Truett =

American clergyman (1867–1944)

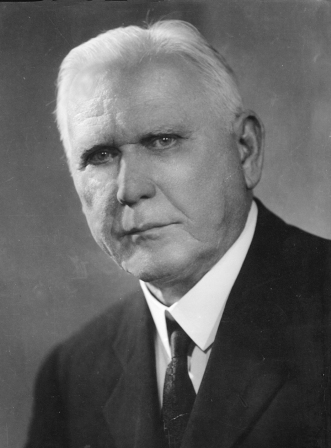
- Born: May 6, 1867; Hayesville, North Carolina, U.S.
- Died: July 7, 1944 (aged 77); Dallas, Texas, U.S.
- Education: Grayson College (1887–1912), Baylor University
- Occupation: Pastor
- Years active: 1890–1944
- Spouse: Josephine "Jo" Jenkins Truett (married 1894–1944, his death)
- Parent(s): Charles L. and Mary R. Kimsey Truett

Ecclesiastical career
- Religion: Southern Baptist
- Church: First Baptist Church of Dallas (1897–1944)
- Ordained: Whitewright Baptist Church (1890)
- Offices held: President, Southern Baptist Convention (1927–1929)

George Washington Truett, also known as George (Geo) W. Truett (May 6, 1867 – July 7, 1944), was an American clergyman who was the pastor of the First Baptist Church of Dallas, Texas, from 1897 until 1944, and the president of the Southern Baptist Convention from 1927 to 1929. He was one of the "most famous Southern Baptist" preachers and writers of his era while still known today effectively for his educational impact among his many generational ministry legacies in addition to his exegetical preaching and outstanding oratorical skill.

== Early life and education ==
Truett was born on a farm in Hayesville in Clay County in remote Western North Carolina, the seventh child of Charles L. Truett and the former Mary R. Kimsey. His ancestors were of English and Scots-Irish descent, and were pioneers in Appalachia. Several were well-known Baptist preachers. He entered school at Hayesville Academy in 1875 and graduated in 1885. He had a dramatic conversion experience at a Methodist camp meeting revival in 1886.

Truett taught in a Towns County, Georgia, school. In 1887, he founded the Hiawassee Academy in that same county, with the intention of making enough money from private students to pay for law school. In 1889, however, he left his position with the academy to move with his parents to Whitewright, Texas. There he joined the Whitewright Baptist Church and attended Grayson College. He was ordained to the Baptist ministry at the Whitewright church in 1890. He preached his first sermon at the First Baptist Church in nearby Sherman, Texas.

=== Baylor University ===
In 1891, Truett was hired by the president of Baylor University in Waco, Texas, to serve as its financial secretary. Enterprising and energetic, Truett raised $92,000 in less than two years and completely wiped out the school's indebtedness. After his stint as the school's financial secretary, Truett enrolled as a freshman at Baylor in 1893. From 1893 to 1897, he studied at Baylor and served as a student-pastor of the East Waco Baptist Church to pay for his tuition. He graduated in June 1897 with an A.B. degree. Truett would later serve as a Baylor trustee from 1934 to 1939.

== Pastorship ==
Truett forgoes the position of becoming President of Baylor University to follow his ministerial call, accepting the position as pastor of the First Baptist Church in Dallas in September 1897, a position he would hold until his death. During the forty-seven year pastorate, the membership rolls increased from 715 to 7,804; a total of 19,531 new members were received, and total contributions were $6,027,741.52. The church was rebuilt three times during his tenure there to accommodate the expanding congregation. His preaching made him nationally famous, as he criss-crossed the nation leading revivals, participating in religious organizations, and raising funds for churches. He was a leader in the national "Seventy-Five Million Campaign," but the financial results were disappointing. In Texas he led the fundraising for the Texas Baptist Memorial Sanitarium, the forerunner of Baylor Hospital. He avoided politics except for prohibition issues and gambling.

Truett was the president of the Southern Baptist Convention from 1927 to 1929 and of the Baptist World Alliance from 1934 to 1939. During World War I, he was appointed by President Woodrow Wilson as one of 20 preachers sent by the president for a six-month tour to preach to the Allied forces.

One of Truett's most famous sermons, "Baptists and Religious Liberty", was delivered on the steps of the Capitol in Washington, D.C., on May 16, 1920. In this sermon, he claimed that the United States was founded on the principles of religious freedom and separation of church and state. He elaborated anti-Catholic views as the core element in his defense of religious liberty and the separation of church and state. He argued that the Catholic doctrine of baptismal regeneration and transubstantiation is fundamentally subversive of the gospel of Christ. Likewise, the Catholics built their church to separate the individual soul from God, making it "a ghastly tyranny" that frustrates the grace of God, destroys freedom of conscience, and hinders the coming of Kingdom of God. He warned his flock that America was “menaced by our vast and fast-growing cities,” which had become dens of “lawlessness.” Urban centers drew “the alien populations of the world with their strange customs and beliefs and ideals and sentimentalisms.” He said that Catholics rejected separation of church and state and were secretly plotting papal control of the American government.

Truett forwent seminary to become the financial secretary for Baylor University which ultimately saved the school's existence from its indebtedness, leading to its current operability to date. He was orthodox in his beliefs which were largely shaped by following a mentor of his, Benajah Harvey Carroll (B.H. Carroll). He opposed efforts in the 1920s to pass state laws against the teaching of evolution. Fundamentalist elements attacked him for welcoming Northern Baptists to preach at his church in Dallas, and for fighting against the divisive influence of J. Frank Norris. Over the course of his pastoral ministry, he published ten volumes of sermons, two volumes of addresses, and two volumes of Christmas messages.

Reverend Truett worried that cowboys who worked the cattle drives were too isolated from family, church, and society. He made annual trips through the Davis Mountains of West Texas for thirty-seven years, traveling with cattle drives there and preaching.

== Personal life and death ==
Truett married Judge Jenkins' daughter who was a fellow Baylor alumnus, Josephine Jenkins, on June 28, 1894, with whom he had three children, all daughters. He died in Dallas on July 7, 1944. His wife died twelve years later. Both are interred at Sparkman-Hillcrest Memorial Park Cemetery in Dallas.

== Legacy ==
According to John S. Ezell:

In his prime George W. Truett was nearly six feet tall and weighed about 200 pounds, with unusually broad shoulders and erect carriage. Solemn in appearance, he was black-haired, with blue-gray eyes and a wide, sensitive mouth. His remarkable voice made him audible to large crowds without the aid of an amplifying system. He was orthodox in theology, and his oratory, which led him to be compared with William Jennings Bryan, was characterized by directness and conviction; it earned him a place as one of the great preachers of his day.

In 1957 Truett was portrayed by Victor Jory in the episode "Lone Star Preacher" of the syndicated television series, Crossroads. The actress Barbara Eiler was cast as Truett's wife, Jo, who died eleven months before the episode aired.

An authorized but unsourced biography of Truett written by Powhatan James was published in 1939 by Macmillan.

=== Namesakes ===
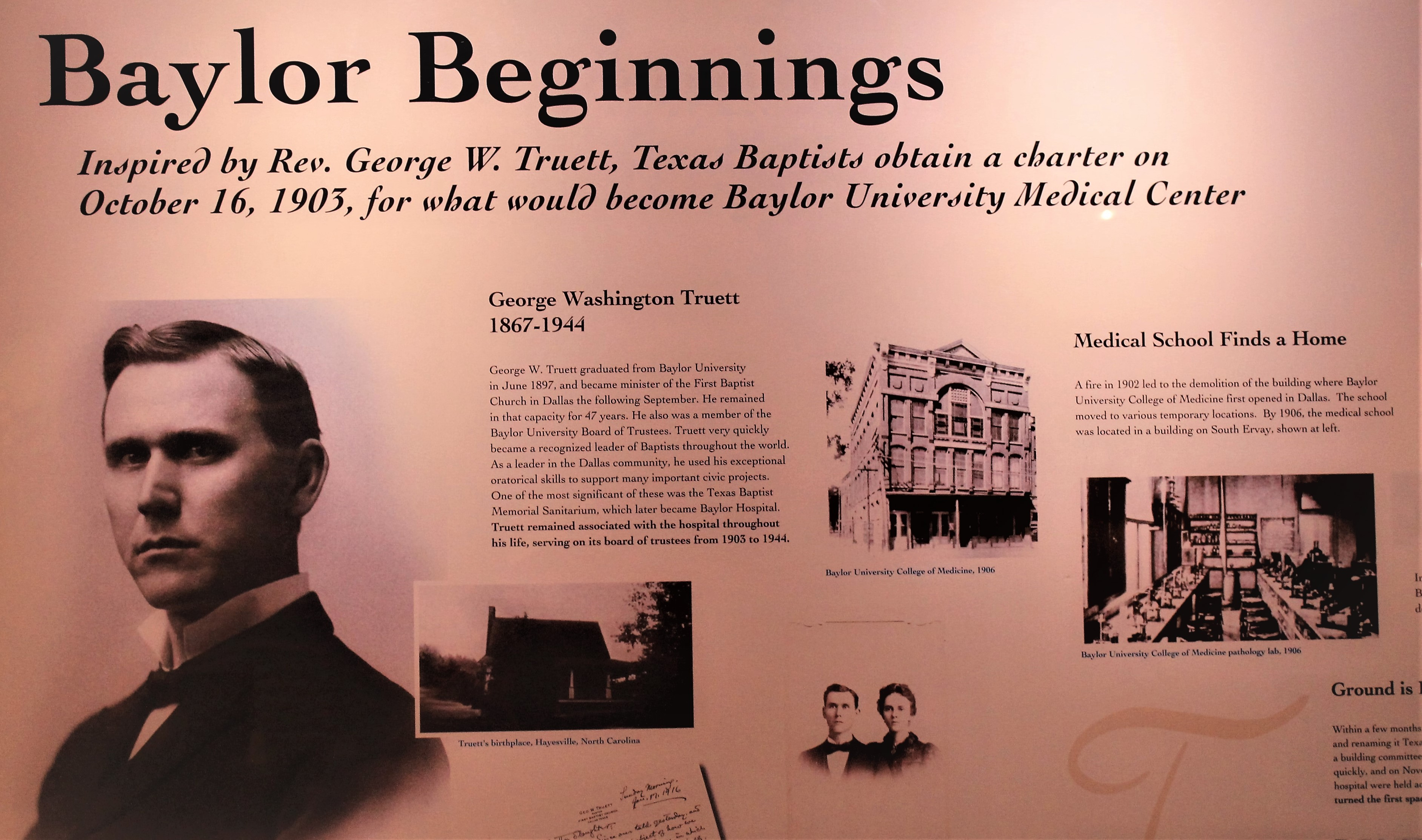
Baylor Medical Center exhibit honoring Reverend Truett.

- The seminary at Baylor University, George W. Truett Theological Seminary
- Truett-McConnell College (named for both Truett and Truett's cousin, Fernando C. McConnell)
- George W. Truett Elementary School, part of the Dallas Independent School District.
- S. Truett Cathy, founder of Chick-fil-A restaurant chain
- Truett Memorial First Baptist Church, Hayesville, North Carolina
- Truett Hospital, located at Baylor University Medical Center at Dallas
- Truett Auditorium, located at Southwestern Baptist Theological Seminary
- Truett Conference Center & Camp, Hayesville, North Carolina

== Published works ==
- George W. Truett (1915). We Would see Jesus: and other Sermons. New York: Fleming H. Revell.
- George W. Truett (1917). A Quest for Souls. Harper & Brothers.
- George W. Truett (1946). Some Vital Questions. Grand Rapids: Eerdmans.
- George W. Truett (1954). After His likeness. Grand Rapids: Eerdmans.
- George W. Truett (1973). Sermons from Paul (George W. Truett Library). Grand Rapids: Baker Book House. ISBN 0-8010-8796-1.

== See also ==
- Baptist World Alliance
- Baylor University
- First Baptist Church (Dallas, Texas)
- List of Southern Baptist Convention affiliated people
- Southern Baptist Convention
- Southern Baptist Convention Presidents

Preceded by George W. McDaniel	President of the Southern Baptist Convention; 1927–1929	Succeeded by W. J. McGlothin
