= Whitewright Independent School District =

School district in Texas, U.S.

Address
- 315-A West Highland Drive Whitewright, TX, USA ESC Region 10
- Coordinates: 33°30′25″N 96°23′51″W

District information
- Type: Independent School District
- Motto: Where The Bell Tolls For Excellence
- Grades: PK-12
- Superintendent: Brian Garner
- Governing agency: Texas Education Agency
- Schools: 3
- NCES District ID: 4845670

Students and staff
- Students: 793 (2025-26)
- Athletic conference: UIL Class AA
- District mascot: Tigers
- Colors: Black & Old Gold

Other information
- Website: www.whitewrightisd.com

Whitewright Independent School District (Whitewright ISD, WISD) is a public school district based in Whitewright, Texas, United States. Covering 73 square miles, the district is primarily located in southeastern Grayson County, with small portions extending into western Fannin and northeastern Collin counties, and serves the City of Whitewright and surrounding areas.

As of 2026, Whitewright ISD operates three campuses, including one high school, one middle school, and one elementary school. The district most recently received a B rating from the Texas Education Agency (TEA).

== Schools ==
- Whitewright High School (grades 9–12)
- Whitewright Middle School (grades 6–8)
- Whitewright Elementary School (grades PK-5)
