= Samuel Vernon =

American silversmith (1683–1737)

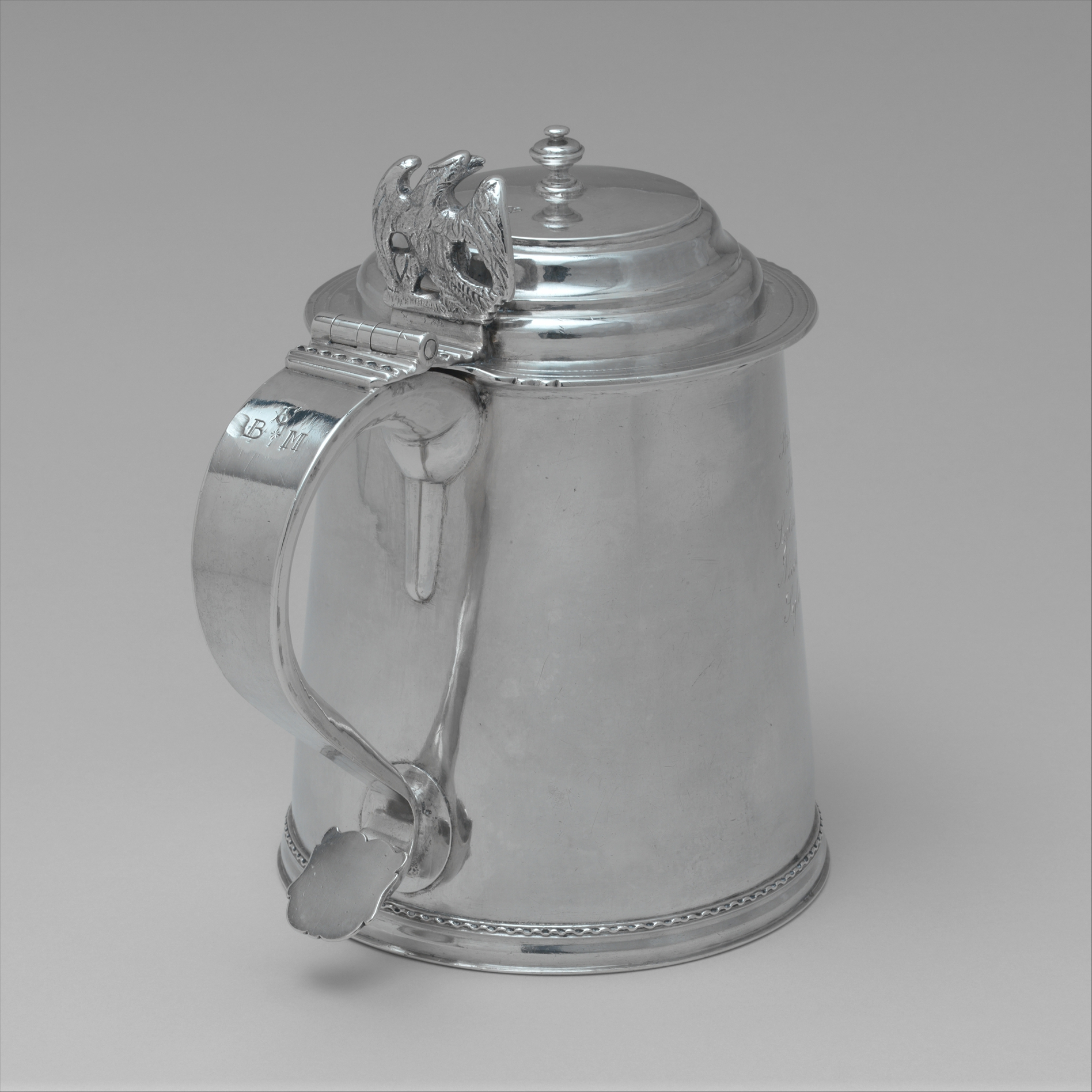
Tankard by Samuel Vernon, 1705–1715

Coat of Arms of Samuel Vernon

Samuel Vernon (December 6, 1683 – December 5, 1737) was a silversmith, active in Newport, Rhode Island in the Thirteen Colonies.

Vernon was born in Narragansett, Rhode Island to Daniel and Ann (Dyer) Hutchinson Vernon, and was a direct descendant of Anne Hutchinson. Two of his cousins were also prominent silversmiths: John Coddington of Newport and Edward Winslow of Boston. He married twice: to Elizabeth Fleet of Long Island on April 10, 1707, and to Elizabeth Paine on January 12, 1725. His sons, including William Vernon, were among the most prominent of the Newport Slave Traders.

Vernon apprenticed about 1696, perhaps to John Coney in Boston or to his cousin Edward Winslow. He was made a freeman of Newport in 1714, in 1715 made engravings and printed Rhode Island's paper currency, in 1726 advertised his silver shop north of Goulds Tailors, and in 1733 was commissioned by the General Assembly of the Colony of Rhode Island to create three tankards for New York commissioners Col. Isaac Hicks of Hempstead, James Jackson of Flushing, and Col. Lewis Morris Jr. of Westchester. Vernon was also an active member of his community. In 1728 he was appointed Justice of the Peace in Newport, circa 1729-1737 served as Assistant in General Assembly and assistant to Governor investigating health conditions, and in 1737 served on the Committee to settle a boundary dispute between Massachusetts and New Hampshire.

His work is collected in the Metropolitan Museum of Art, Museum of Fine Arts, Boston, Rhode Island School of Design Museum, Winterthur Museum, and Yale University Art Gallery.
