= Whitewright High School =

Location
- 304 West Echols Lane; Whitewright, Texas 75491-0888; United States; 33.504543°N 96.395624°W

Information
- School type: Public high school
- School district: Whitewright Independent School District
- Principal: Jorge Rubio
- Teaching staff: 24.00 (FTE)
- Grades: 9-12
- Enrollment: 244 (2023–2024)
- Student to teacher ratio: 10.17
- Colors: Black & Gold
- Athletics conference: UIL Class 2A
- Mascot: Tiger
- Website: www.whitewrightisd.com/114013_2

Whitewright High School is a public high school located in Whitewright, Texas, United States. It is part of the Whitewright Independent School District located in the southeast corner of Grayson County and classified as a 2A school by the University Interscholastic League (UIL). In 2015, the school was rated "Met Standard" by the Texas Education Agency.

== Athletics ==
The Whitewright Tigers compete in these sports -

- Baseball
- Basketball
- Cross Country
- Football
- Golf
- Powerlifting
- Softball
- Tennis
- Track and Field
- Volleyball
- Cheerleading

Marching Band

=== State Finalists ===
- Boys Basketball -
  - 1975(1A), 1977(1A)
