= Redwood Library and Athenaeum =

Subscription library in Newport, Rhode Island, United States

Redwood Library
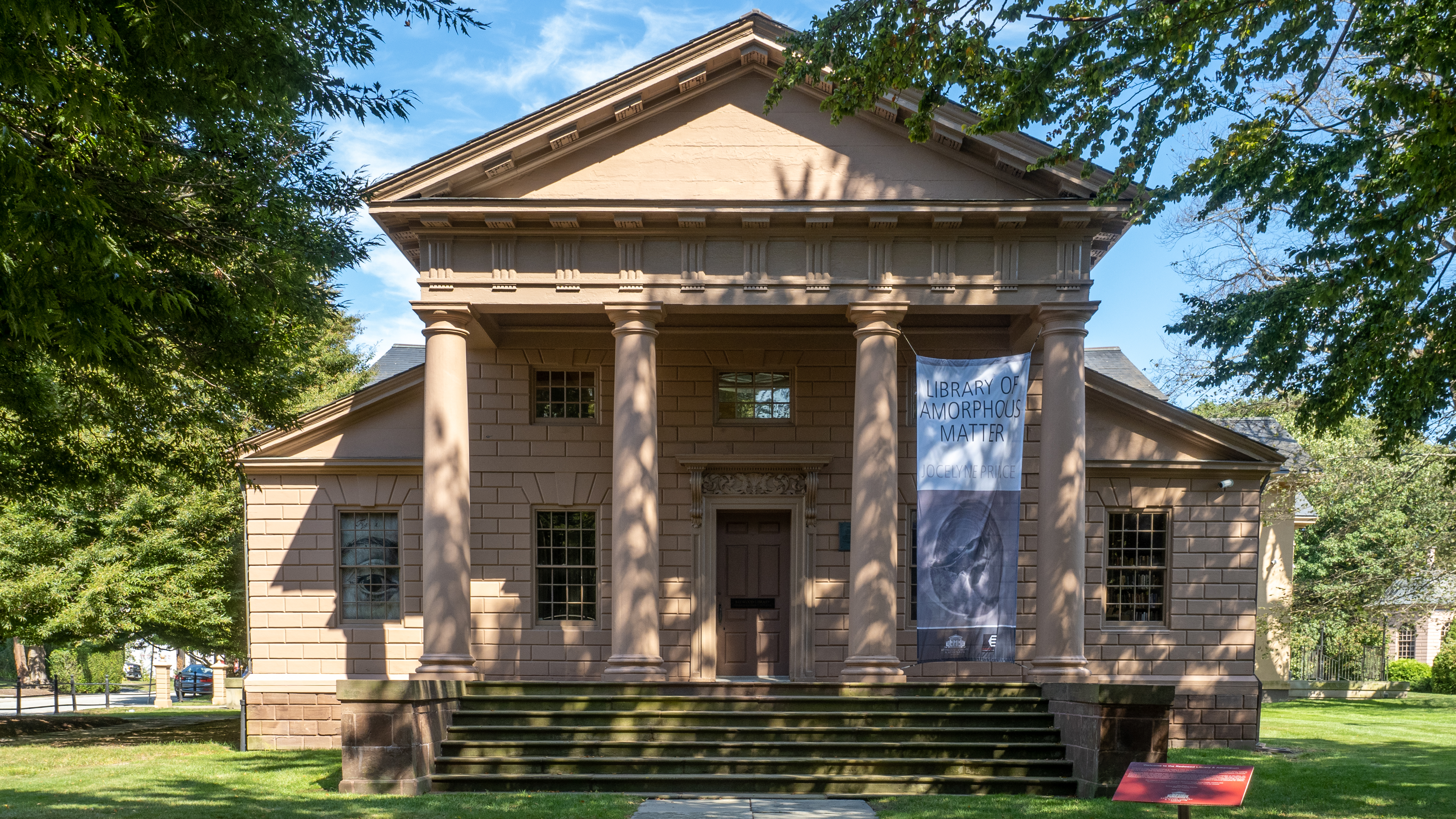
- The building's façade
- Location: Newport, Rhode Island
- Type: Subscription library
- Established: 1747

Access and use
- Circulation: 15,204 (2018)

Other information
- Director: Benedict Leca, Ph.D. FRSA
- Website: www.redwoodlibrary.org
- Redwood Library
- U.S. National Register of Historic Places
- U.S. National Historic Landmark
- U.S. National Historic Landmark District – Contributing property
- Location within Rhode Island
- Location: 50 Bellevue Avenue, Newport, Rhode Island
- Coordinates: 41.486544°N 71.308296°W
- Built: 1748-1750
- Architect: Peter Harrison
- Architectural style: Georgian-Palladian
- Part of: Newport Historic District (ID68000001)
- NRHP reference No.: 66000015

Significant dates
- Added to NRHP: October 15, 1966
- Designated NHL: October 9, 1960
- Designated NHLDCP: November 24, 1968

The Redwood Library and Athenaeum is a subscription library, museum, rare book repository and research center founded in 1747, and located at 50 Bellevue Avenue in Newport, Rhode Island. The building, designed by Peter Harrison and completed in March 1750, was the first purposely built library in the United States, and the oldest neo-Classical building in the country. It has been in continuous use since its opening.

The building is part of the Kay Street–Catherine Street–Old Beach Road Historic District, and was designated a National Historic Landmark in 1960.

== History ==
=== 18th century ===
The Company of the Redwood Library was established in 1747, in Newport, Rhode Island, by Abraham Redwood and 45 colonists with the goal of making written knowledge more widely available to the Newport community.

The original section of the building was constructed between 1748 and 1750 by architect Peter Harrison. Only the Library Company of Philadelphia is older, founded in 1731 by Benjamin Franklin. The Redwood Library and Athenaeum predates the Charleston Library Society (founded in 1748), New York Society Library (founded in 1754), and the Boston Athenæum (founded in 1807).

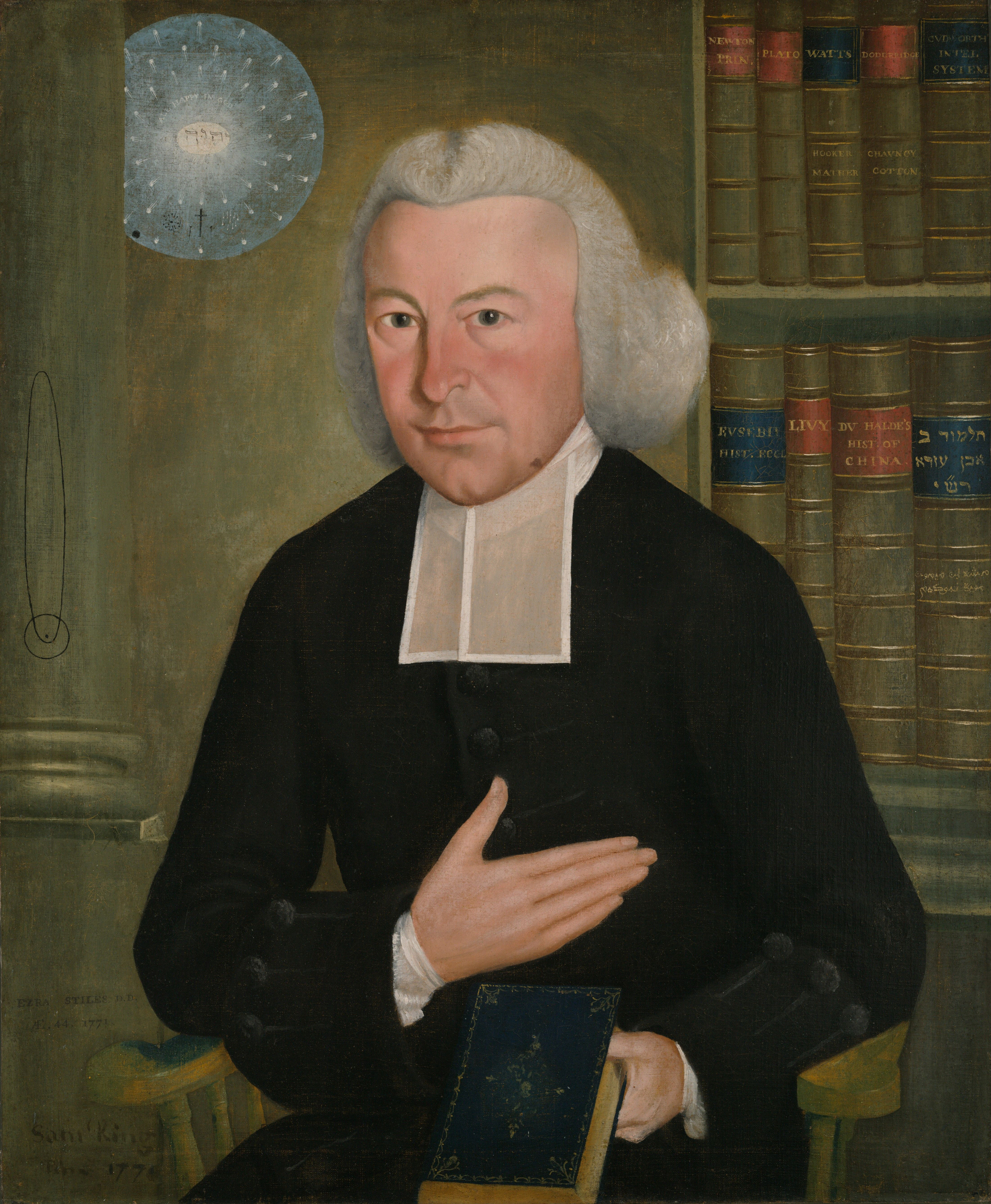
Early Redwood librarian, the Rev. Ezra Stiles, co-founder of Brown University and President of Yale University, painted in 1770–1771, by Samuel King

It was the first classical public building built in America, designed in the manner of Italian Renaissance Architect Andrea Palladio, in the Georgian-Palladian style. The main facade facing Bellevue avenue is based upon a plate in Edward Hoppus' Andrea Palladio's Architecture published in 1735. The oldest section, today called the Harrison Room, still houses the majority of the original books that were purchased as a collection in London. Occupying British troops allegedly looted numerous books (many of which were later returned) prior to the Battle of Rhode Island during the American Revolution.

Ezra Stiles was one of the most prominent librarians at the Library, the influential founder of Brown University and later president of Yale University.

=== 19th century ===
In 1833 the Library furthered its abilities as an institution, and re-established itself as The Company of the Redwood Library and Athenaeum. By 1858, the membership and collection had grown so much that an expansion was needed. This expansion, which became known as the Roderick Terry Reading Room, was produced by George Snell of Boston.

Within 10 years of the Reading Room being completed, architect Richard Morris Hunt was contacted to furnish another expansion for the library. His plans ultimately called for "an entirely new and enlarged structure of stone and marble shall (that) take the place of the existing wooden erections." Ultimately, Hunt's plans were rejected, although it is unclear whether that was due to monetary restriction on the part of the Redwood Library, or their disapproval of what could be construed as Hunt's irreverence for Peter Harrison's architecture.

In 1875, plans did go forward to develop another expansion to the Library. The Rovensky Delivery Room was designed by famed architect George Champlin Mason. At the time, the collections were in closed stacks, and when a book was requested, the librarian would retrieve it and bring it to the member in the delivery room.

=== 20th century ===
In 1915, historian and architect Norman Isham restored the eighteenth century Harrison room to what he concluded was its original appearance. The Library's modern collection now includes more than 200,000 volumes as well as a museum collection of art and artifacts. The building was designated a National Historic Landmark in 1966.

== Gallery ==
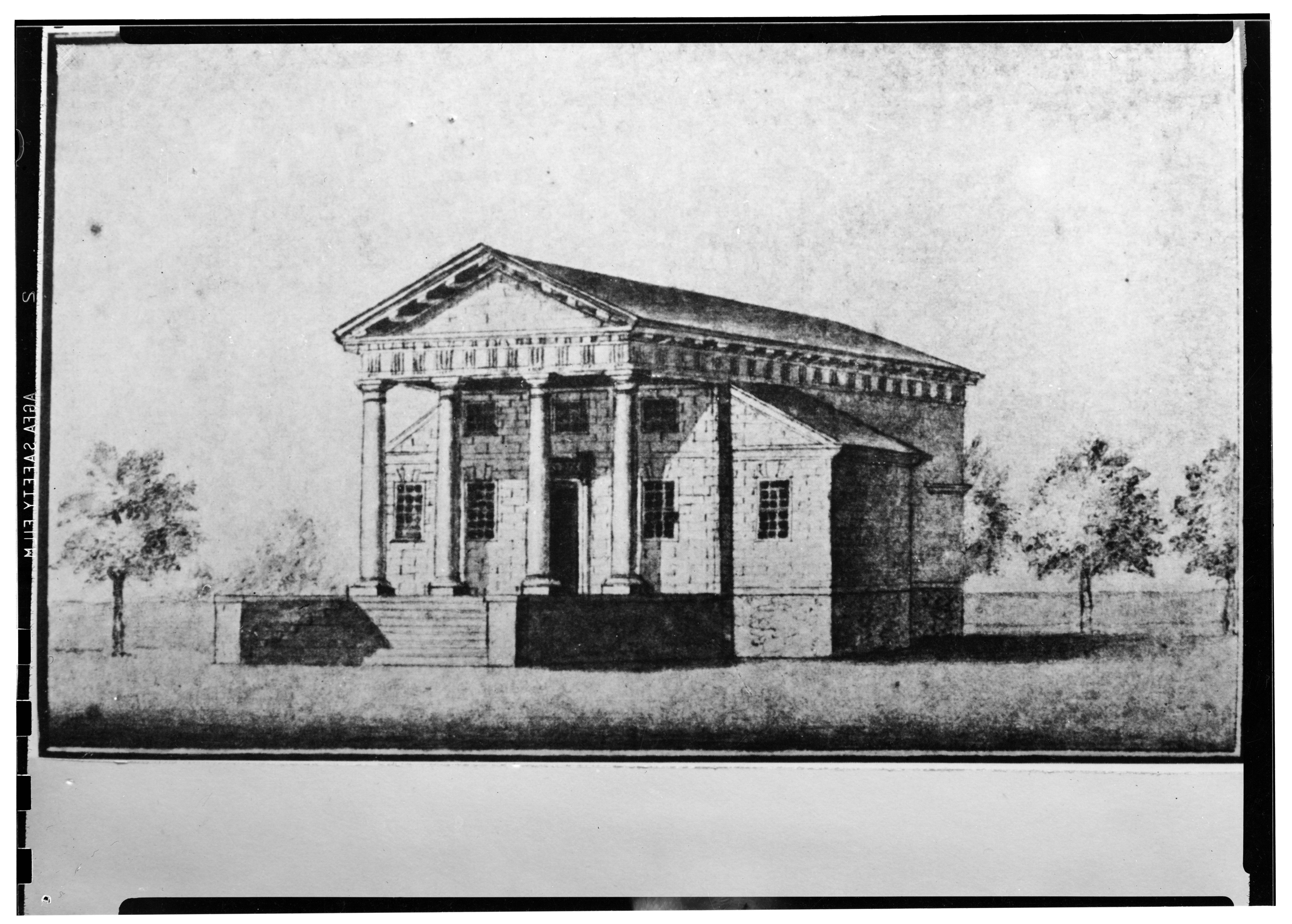
Drawing of Redwood Library in 1768 by Pierre Eugene du Simitiere

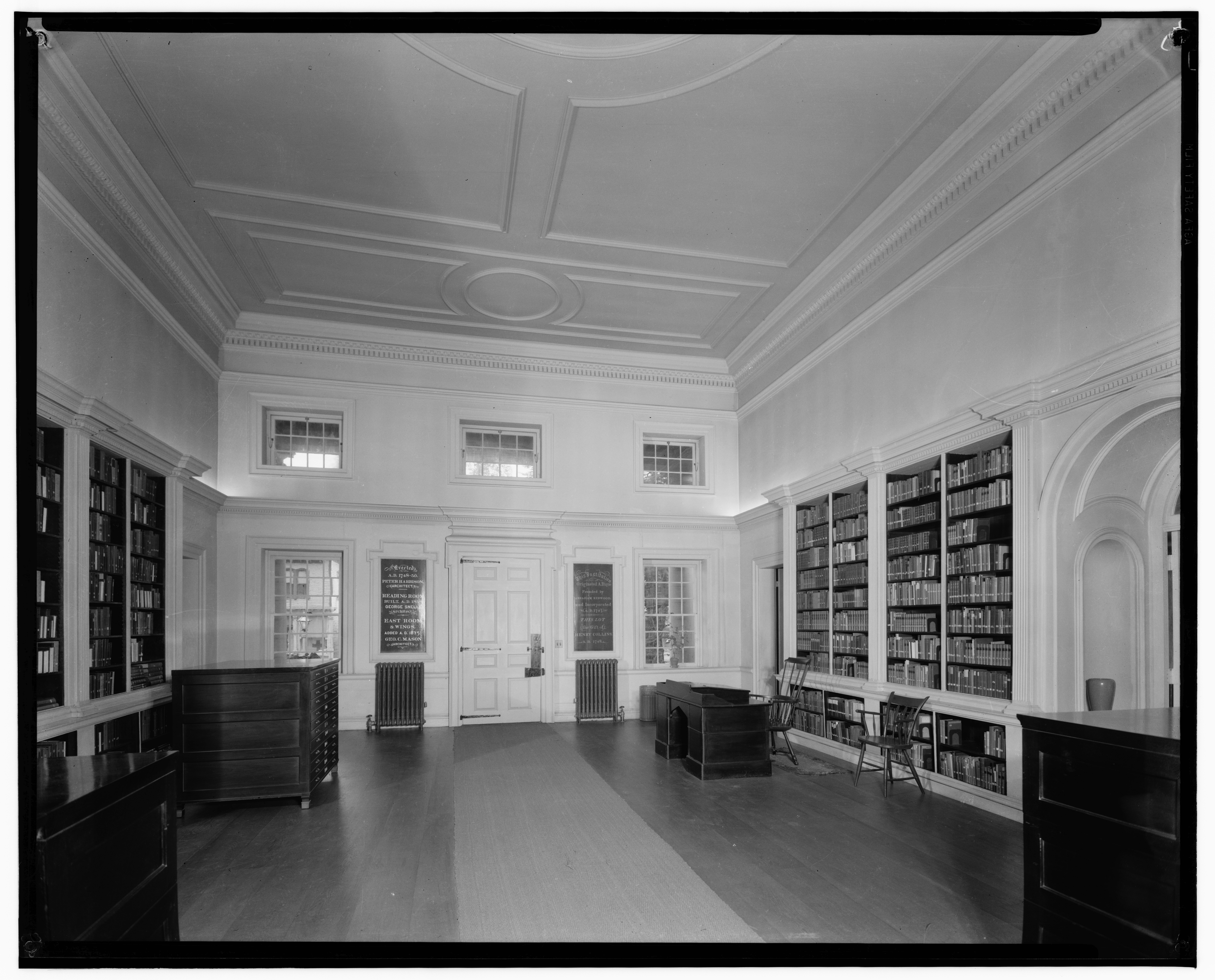
Reference room, 1937

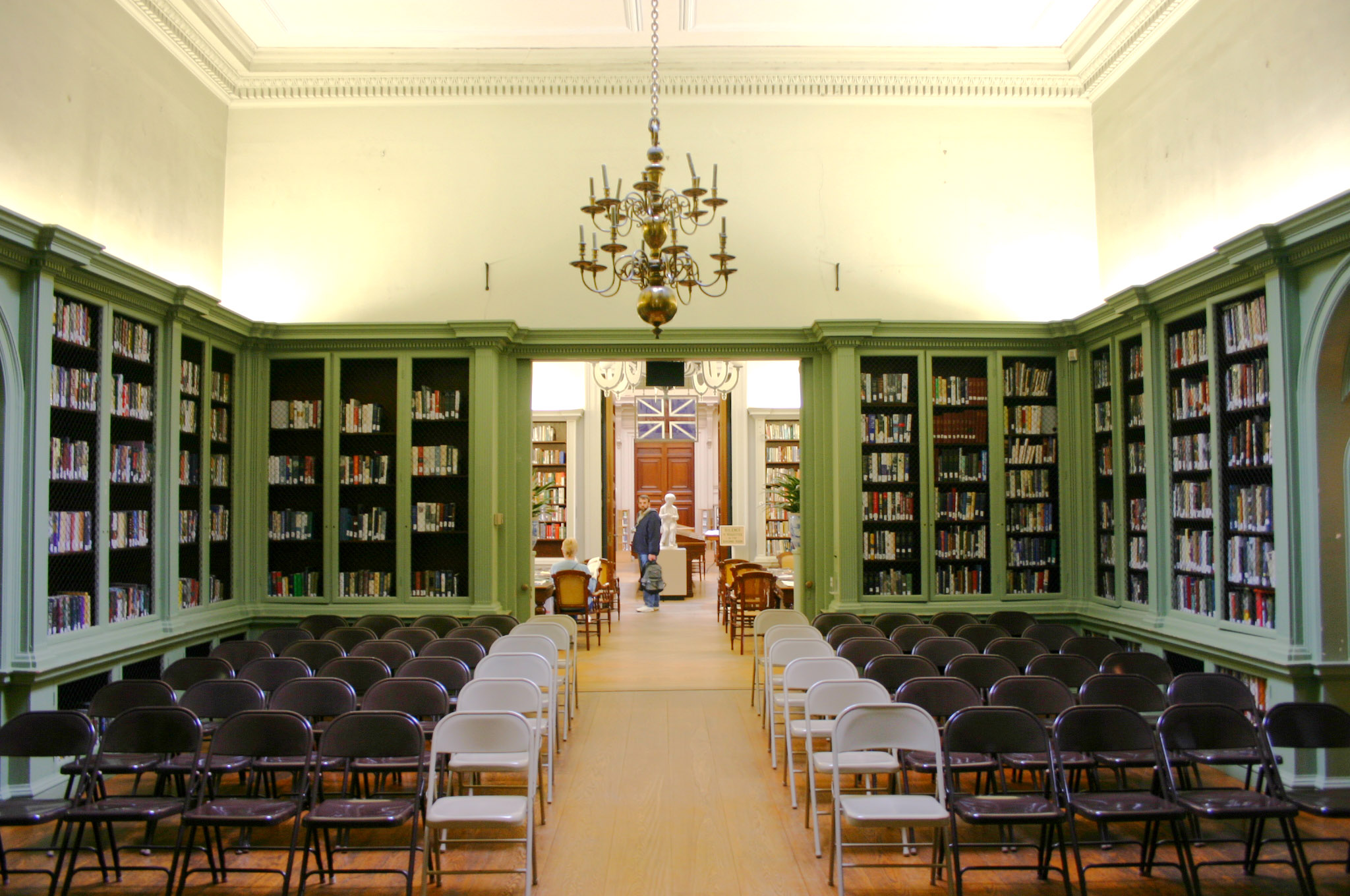
The building's interior in 2004

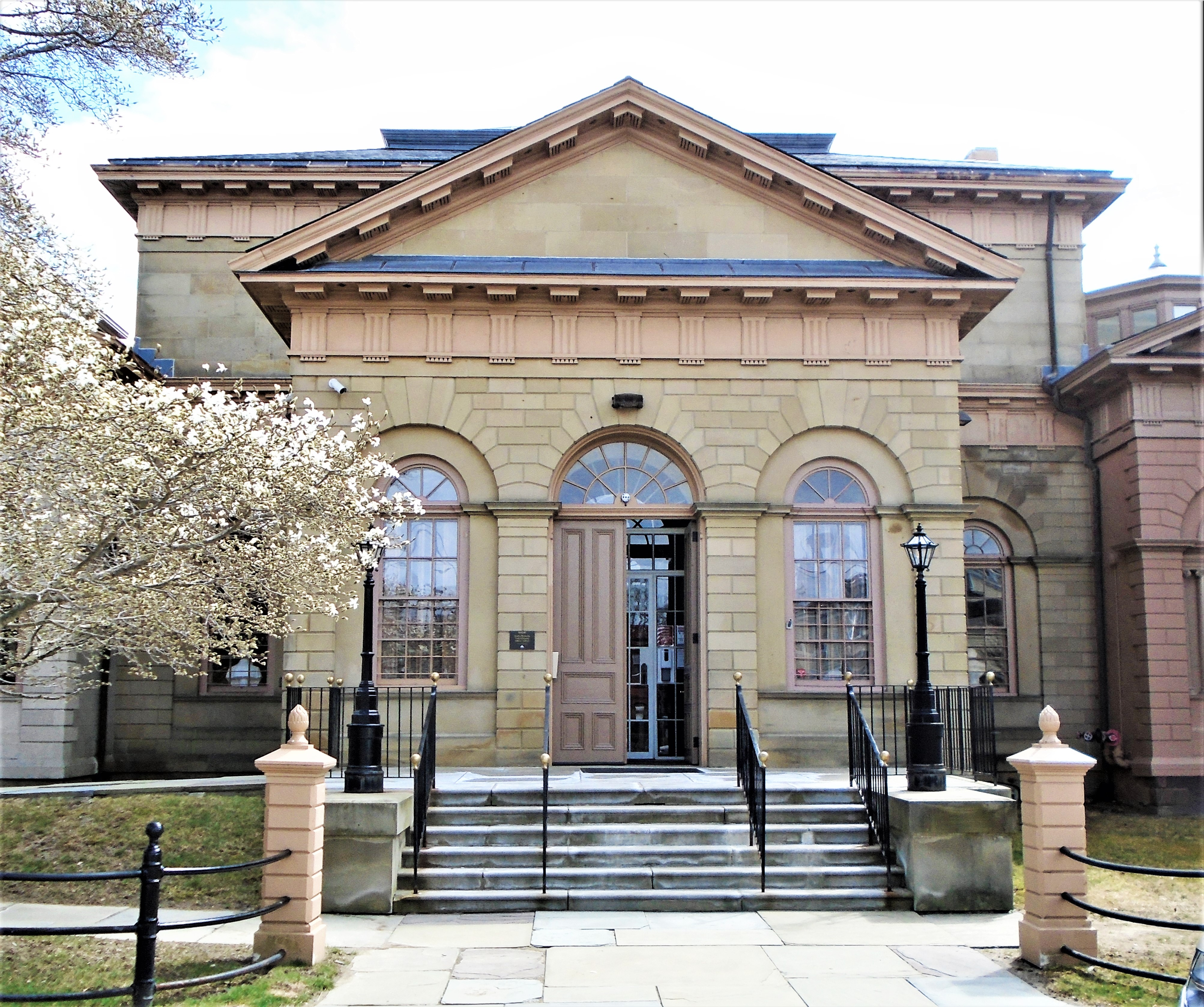
The side (main) entrance at 50 Bellevue Avenue (2021)

== See also ==
- List of libraries in Rhode Island
- List of National Historic Landmarks in Rhode Island
- National Register of Historic Places listings in Newport County, Rhode Island
