= Lippitt =

Lippitt is a surname, and may refer to:

- Charles W. Lippitt (1846–1924), Governor of Rhode Island
- Christopher Lippitt (1744–1824), American Revolutionary War officer and businessman
- Costello Lippitt (1842–1924), State Treasurer of Connecticut
- Francis J. Lippitt (1812–1902), American lawyer and Army officer
- Frederick Lippitt (1917–2005), Rhode Island House minority leader
- Henry Lippitt (1818–1891), Governor of Rhode Island
- Henry Frederick Lippitt (1856–1933), US Senator from Rhode Island
- John W. Lippitt (1822–1896), New York politician
- Margaret Walthour Lippitt (1872–1964), American painter and art educator
- Mary Ann Lippitt (1918–2006), American pilot and philanthropist

== See also ==
- Lippett (surname)
