= Governor Lippitt =

Governor Lippitt may refer to:

- Charles W. Lippitt (1846–1924), 44th Governor of Rhode Island
- Henry Lippitt (1818–1891), 33rd Governor of Rhode Island
