= Tew =

Tew or TEW may refer to:

== People ==
- Alan Tew (1930–1997), British composer
- Alex Tew (born 1984), British Internet self-promoter
- George Washington Tew (1829–1884), American Union army officer and brevet brigadier general
- Gloria Tew (1923–2022), American abstract artist
- Henry Tew (1654–1718), colonial Deputy Governor of Rhode Island
- Mary Tew (1921–2007), British anthropologist Mary Douglas
- Philip Tew (born 1954), Professor of English (Post-1900 Literature), Brunel University
- Thomas Tew (1649–1695), early American pirate, possible brother of Henry Tew
- Allene Tew (1872–1955), an American socialite
- Charles C. Tew (1827–1862), colonel in the CSA and was killed in action at the Battle of Antietam during the American Civil War

== Places ==
- Great Tew, Oxfordshire
- Little Tew, Oxfordshire:
- Duns Tew, Oxfordshire

== Video games ==
- Total Extreme Warfare, a professional wrestling text simulator
- The Enemy Within Campaign of Warhammer Fantasy Roleplay

== Other ==
- Mason Jewett Field, a general aviation airport in Mason, Michigan, with the IATA code TEW
- Terrorism Early Warning Groups
- Thermoplastic Equipment Wire AKA MTW Machine Tool Wire

== See also ==
- Tewes, a surname
- Týr, god of single combat, victory and heroic glory in Norse mythology
