= George Washington Tew =

American military officer

George Washington Tew (November 13, 1829 – November 8, 1884) was an American Union brevet brigadier general during the period of the American Civil War.

== Biography ==
Born in Newport, Rhode Island, Tew joined the Rhode Island Home Guards in 1846. In 1860 he became commanding officer (with the rank of colonel) of the Newport Artillery Company.

When the Civil War began, he was commissioned a captain of Company F, 1st Rhode Island Detached militia. Company F was primarily formed from members of the Newport Artillery Company. The 1st Rhode Island fought at the Battle of Bull Run and was mustered out of service in August 1861. Shortly afterwards, Tew was appointed a captain in the 4th Rhode Island Infantry and was soon promoted to lieutenant colonel. Tew fought at the Battle of Roanoke Island, the Battle of New Bern, and the Siege of Fort Macon. He prominently participated in the rescue of Massachusetts troops at Little Washington in North Carolina. In 1863, the 5th Rhode Island Infantry was reformed as a heavy artillery unit, and Tew was promoted to lieutenant colonel. He served with the 5th Rhode Island until the regiment was mustered out of service in June 1865. After the war, he received his commission as a brevet brigadier general, dated to March 13, 1865, in honor of his distinguished service during the war.

After the war, Tew continued to reside in Newport until his death. He is buried in the Island Cemetery in Newport.

== Dates of rank ==
- Colonel, Rhode Island Militia - April 1860
- Captain, Company F, 1st Rhode Island Detached Militia - April 1861
- Honorably Mustered Out of Service - 2 August 1861
- Captain, 4th Rhode Island Infantry - September 1861
- Major, 4th Rhode Island Infantry - 30 October 1861
- Lieutenant Colonel, 4th Rhode Island Infantry - 20 November 1861
- Resigned - 11 August 1862
- Captain, 5th Rhode Island Infantry - 24 September 1862
- Major, 5th Rhode Island Infantry - 1 October 1862
- Lieutenant Colonel, 5th Rhode Island Heavy Artillery - 2 March 1863
- Brevet Brigadier General - 13 March 1865
- Honorably Mustered Out of Service - 26 June 1865
