= Los Angeles Airport Police =

Police division of Los Angeles World Airports

Los Angeles Airport Police Division
- Patch of the Los Angeles Airport Police

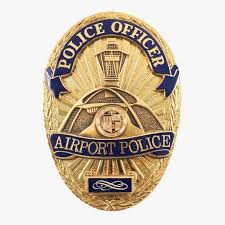
- LAXPD officer badge, with number omitted

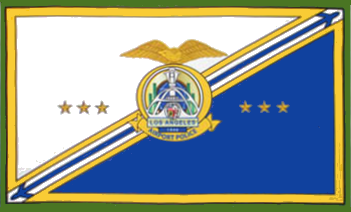
- Flag of the Los Angeles Airport Police
- Abbreviation: LAXPD
- Motto: Serving the Aviation Community

Agency overview
- Formed: 1946
- Preceding agencies: Los Angeles Airport Security Bureau; Los Angeles Airport Security Division

Jurisdictional structure
- Operations jurisdiction: Los Angeles, California, U.S.
- Governing body: Los Angeles World Airports
- General nature: Civilian police

Operational structure
- Police officers: 564
- Unsworn members: 430 security officers; 200 civilian staff
- Agency executive: Cecil W. Rhambo Jr., Chief of Police

Website
- Official website

The Los Angeles Airport Police (LAXPD) is the airport police division of Los Angeles World Airports (LAWA), the city department that owns and operates two airports in Los Angeles: Los Angeles International Airport and Van Nuys Airport. It has more than 1,100 officers, security, and staff. Though it works very closely with the Los Angeles Police Department (LAPD), LAXPD is a separate entity, primarily due to the airport police having specialized training and funding resources.

== History ==
=== Early history 1946–1959 ===
The Los Angeles Airport Police traces its beginnings to 1946, when the Los Angeles Airport was transferred from the War Department to the City of Los Angeles. The airport was later known informally as Los Angeles Jetport, finally becoming Los Angeles International Airport, with the three-letter IATA designator of LAX. Six armed Airport Guards and one supervisor were hired to provide physical security over City properties.

The number expanded to nine in 1949, the same year that the officers were re-classified as Special Officers of the City of Los Angeles. The Special Officers were armed and worked for the Operations Bureau under the direction of the on-duty Superintendent of Operations.

=== Airport Security Division 1959–1981 ===
In 1959, the number increased to 12, led by the first Chief of Security George Dorian, with the organization being known as the Security Division of the Operations Bureau. The organization was responsible for general physical security and for patrolling airport areas. In 1961, with the opening of the new "Jet Age" passenger terminal, a detachment of officers from the LAPD were permanently assigned to LAX, working closely with the airport Special Officers.

In 1968, Special Officers of the Department of Airports were granted peace officer status by the California legislature. Slow growth occurred over the years, until 1973, when approximately 70 officers and sergeants were assigned. A single lieutenant position was added in the early 1970s.

Approximately 30 unarmed, non-sworn Security Officers were first employed in 1975, staffing airfield access control posts. They remain in service today, numbering approximately 275, with their own supervisory ranks to the second level (Lieutenant). Their duties have been expanded to include traffic control, parking enforcement, vehicle inspection screening, crowd control and assisting travelers with information.

=== Boarding Services Bureau (Anti-Hijack Detail) 1973–1981 ===
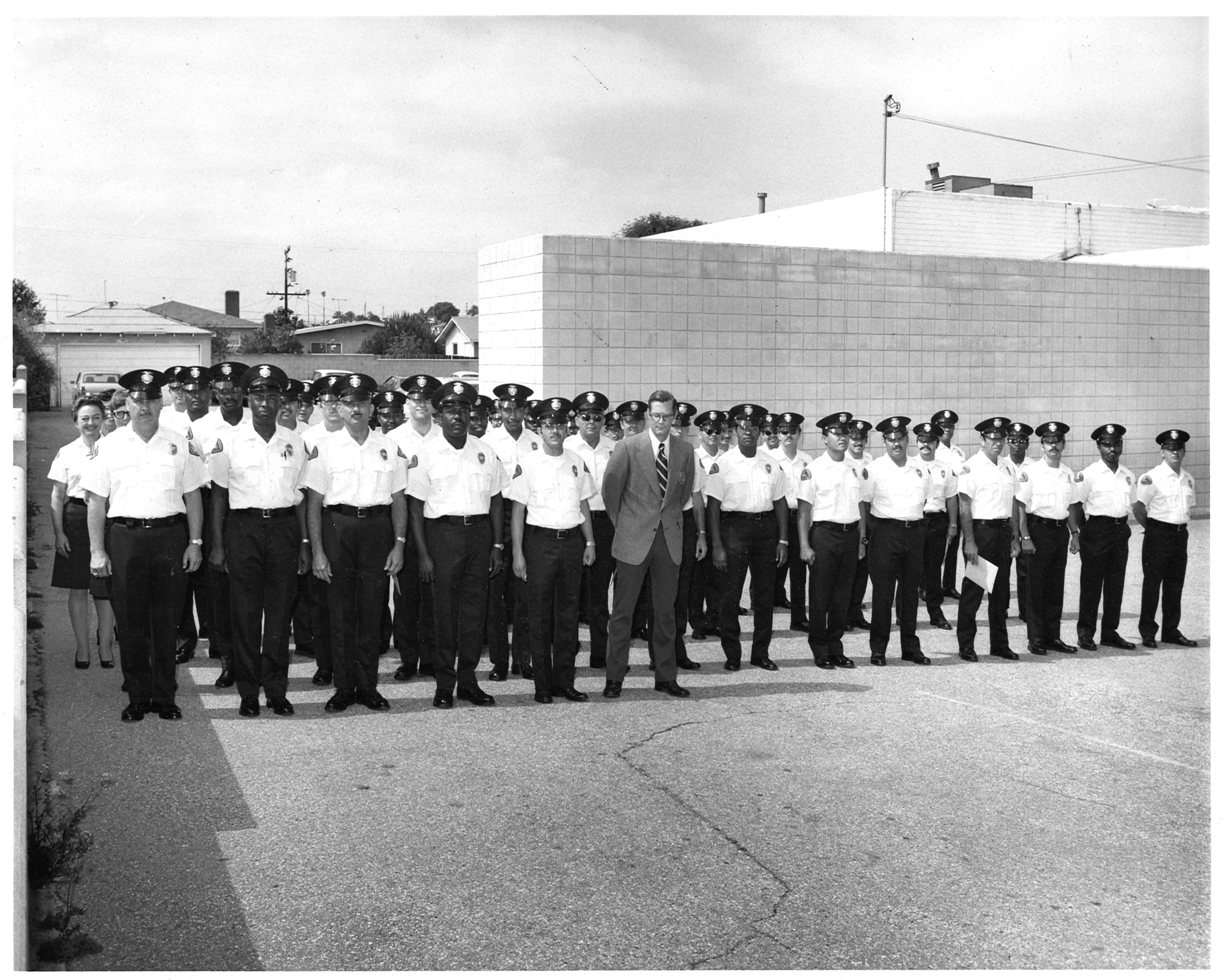
The Boarding Services Bureau stands in formation with their Director, Joseph R. Clair Jr., in 1973.

In 1973, in response to worldwide aircraft hijacking concerns, a separate organization of peace officers was created, with responsibility to provide armed presence at passenger screening stations. This organization, the Boarding Services Bureau, had approximately 75 members, including one director, one lieutenant, five sergeants. Proposition 13, passed in 1978, limited the LAPD's ability to increase staffing at LAX.

=== Airport Security Bureau 1981–1984 ===
In 1981, the Security Division and the Boarding Services Bureau were merged, becoming the Airport Security Bureau. Substantial increases in authorized strength were connected to the 1984 Summer Olympics.

=== Los Angeles Airport Police 1984–present ===
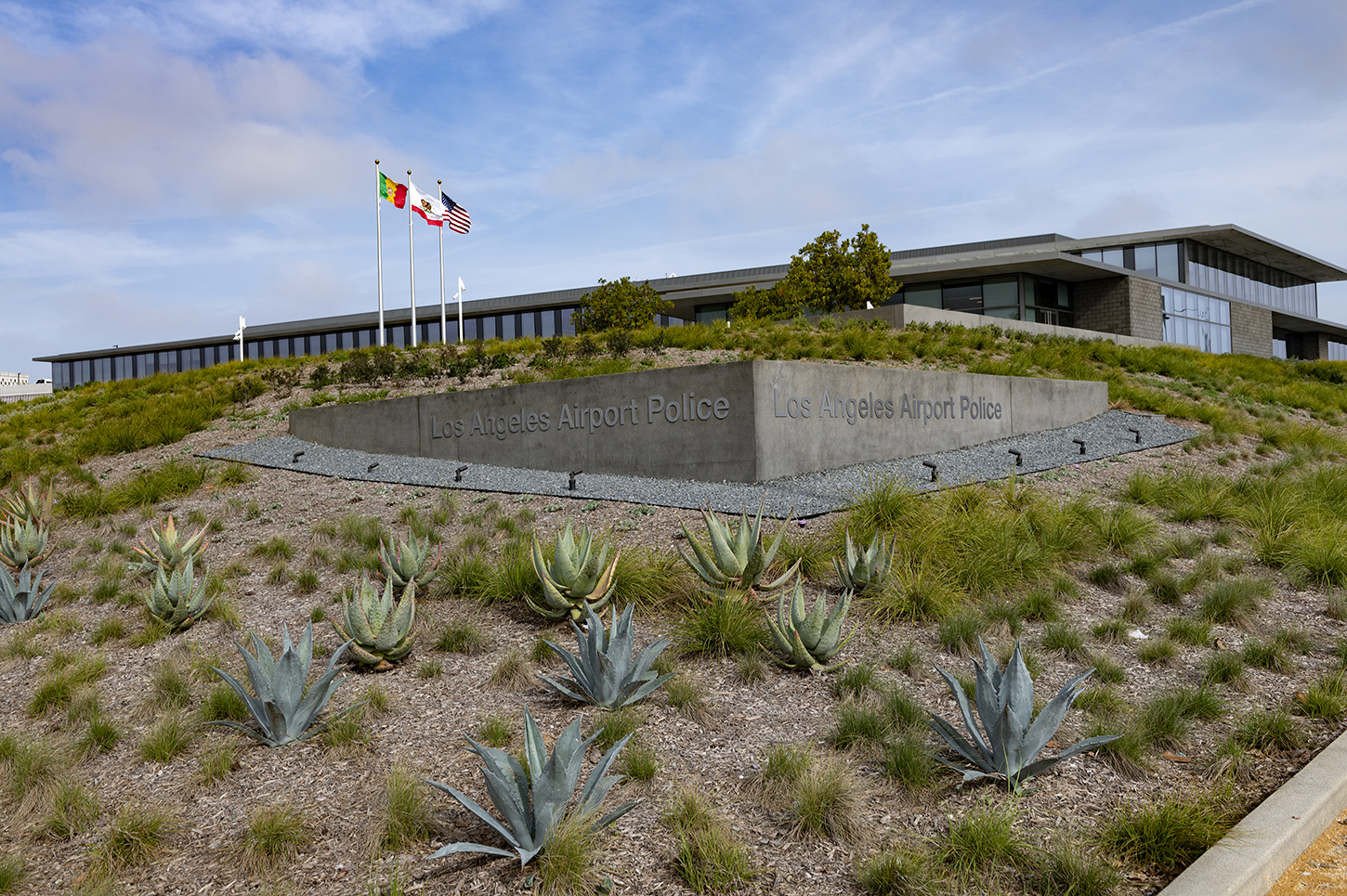
Airport Police Facility, the department's headquarters, which opened in fall 2021.

In 1984, the Airport Security Bureau was renamed the Los Angeles Airport Police. At various times, it has organizationally been a bureau or a division of LAWA, depending on LAWA organizational structures; the "Bureau" designation is no longer used.

In 1986, the LAXPD formed the Dignitary Protection Unit, which works closely with the United States Secret Service and Department of State to protect high security risk government VIPs. The LAXPD Dignitary Protection Unit participates as a key member of the LAX Airport Security Advisory Committee, and has representatives assigned to the Los Angeles Joint Terrorism Task Force and Los Angeles County Terrorism Early Warning Group. The LAXPD is a founding member of InterPortPolice and the Airport Law Enforcement Agencies Network.

In 2004, the City of Los Angeles Personnel Department changed the LAXPD's job classification from Special Officer to Airport Police Officer. The LAXPD more than doubled in size between 1999 and 2005, from slightly over 400 officers to over 900.

The LAXPD is a course presenter for law enforcement training under the auspices of the California Commission on Peace Officer Standards and Training (POST). The Airport Police fields over 20 patrol and explosive detection police dogs, maintaining the largest TSA canine explosive detection program in the U.S. within an aviation environment.

== Uniforms ==
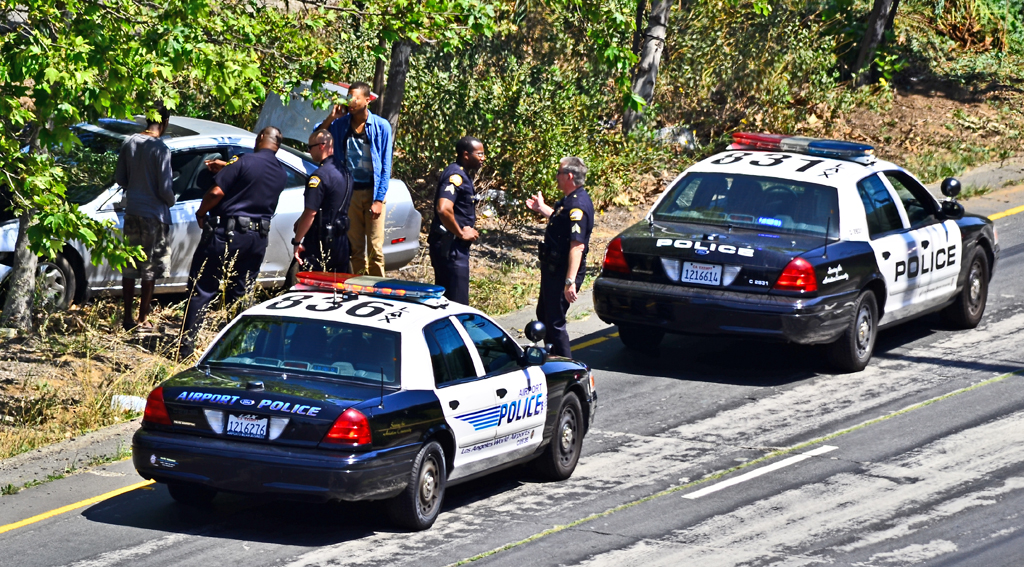
LAXPD officers and cruisers at the scene of a traffic collision in 2012

The original issued uniform from 1946 to approximately 1966 was slate gray, sometimes referred to by officers as "Confederate Gray". The gray uniforms were sometimes augmented by a blue-gray uniform when gray uniforms were not available. The uniform changed in 1966 to forest green trousers, jacket and caps, with tan shirts. The Boarding Services Bureau uniform (1973–1981) consisted of midnight navy trousers, jacket and cap, white shirts. Supervisors wore gold colored accessories, such as tie bars, nameplates etc. In 1981, along with the merger of the Security Division and the Boarding Services Bureau, the uniform was standardized with dark navy trousers, cap, shirts, and a black jacket. All accessories were made in gold color for all ranks. The unarmed non-sworn Security Officers wore the same uniform as the sworn officers until 1999, when they reverted to the sheriff-style green/tan combination, partly as an identification measure during emergency situations. Black Nomex uniforms are worn by officers assigned to K-9 duties. Additionally, blue BDUs are issued to all sworn officers and are worn as a work/utility uniform as well as an Emergency Services uniform.

Badges do not have "Los Angeles" included as part of the lettering, other than in very small type on the City Seal. It was felt that the inclusion of the LAX Theme Building and control tower would be distinctive enough to identify which Airport Police was being represented by the badge

== Rank structure ==
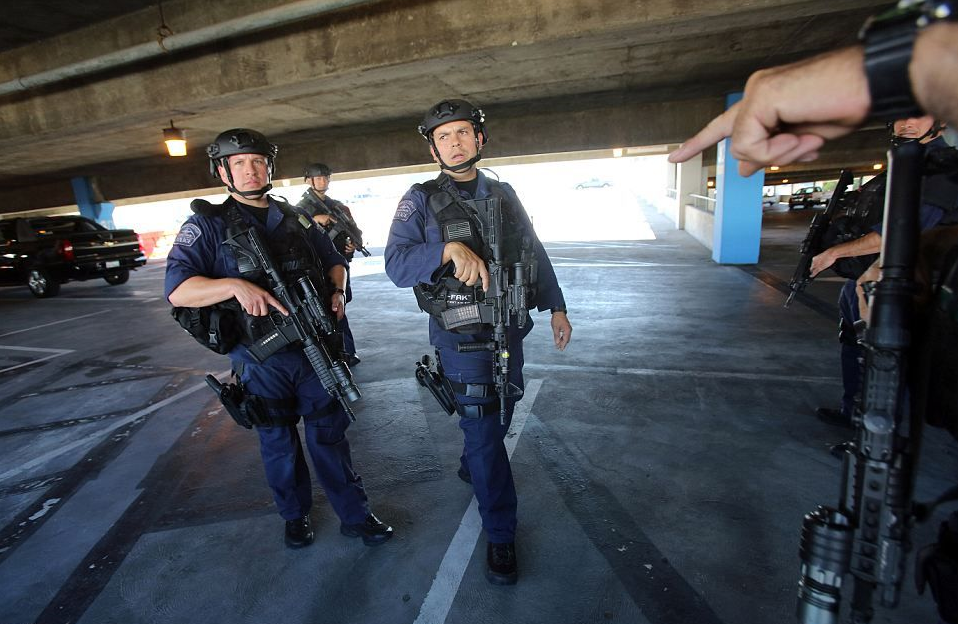
LAXPD ESU responding to a shooting in Terminal 3 in November 2021

As is the case with most uniformed law enforcement agencies, the Los Angeles Airport Police has a paramilitary organizational structure. The rank structure has changed over the years: for example, Assistant Chief and Deputy Chief ranks were used from 1980 to 1986, but were dormant from 1986 to 2007. In 2011, the rank of Commander was not in use. A four-stripe rank Sergeant (with an added bottom rocker, similar to U.S. Army Staff Sergeant) was used from 1980 until 1986 to differentiate active sergeants from other sergeants who had previously served in Boarding Service Bureau at a lower paygrade. Field Training Officers, Detectives, and K9 officers receive a bonus for those duties.

Security Officers have their own rank structure for first and second level supervisors. Senior Security Officer is considered to be the functional equivalent of a sergeant, while Principal Security Officer is considered to be the functional equivalent of a lieutenant. However, neither has any operational authority over sworn officers.

Other civilian (non-sworn) employees have their own supervisory ranks, depending on position and job classifications. For instance, Senior Communications Operators supervise Communications Operators. Sworn supervisors may supervise both sworn and non-sworn employees; however, civilian (non-sworn) supervisors do not supervise sworn employees.

Title	Insignia
Airport Police Chief	
Assistant Airport Police Chief	
Airport Police Commander	
Airport Police Captain II	
Airport Police Captain I	
Airport Police Lieutenant	
Airport Police Sergeant II	
Airport Police Sergeant I	
Airport Police Officer III+1; Detective Assignment	
Airport Police Officer III+1; Senior Lead Officer Assignment	
Airport Police Officer III; Field Training Officer Assignment	
Airport Police Officer II; Airport Police Officer I Officer in Training	No insignia

Service stripe

The LAXPD issues service stripe to officers in the form of hash marks. One hash mark denotes five years of service.

== Civilian oversight ==
As an autonomous organization subordinate to LAWA, civilian oversight of the LAXPD is through the LAWA chain of command. Prior to 1999, the chief of police at LAX reported to the LAX airport manager. That relationship changed when the chief of police was placed on par with the airport manager in the LAWA structure. Starting in 1999, the chief of police reported to one of the deputy executive directors for LAWA. From that level, the chain of command went up to the executive director, then to the Los Angeles Airport Commission, and finally to the mayor of Los Angeles. In 2010, the deputy executive director reporting relationship was eliminated, with the chief of police now reporting directly to the LAWA executive director.

== Partnership with LAPD ==
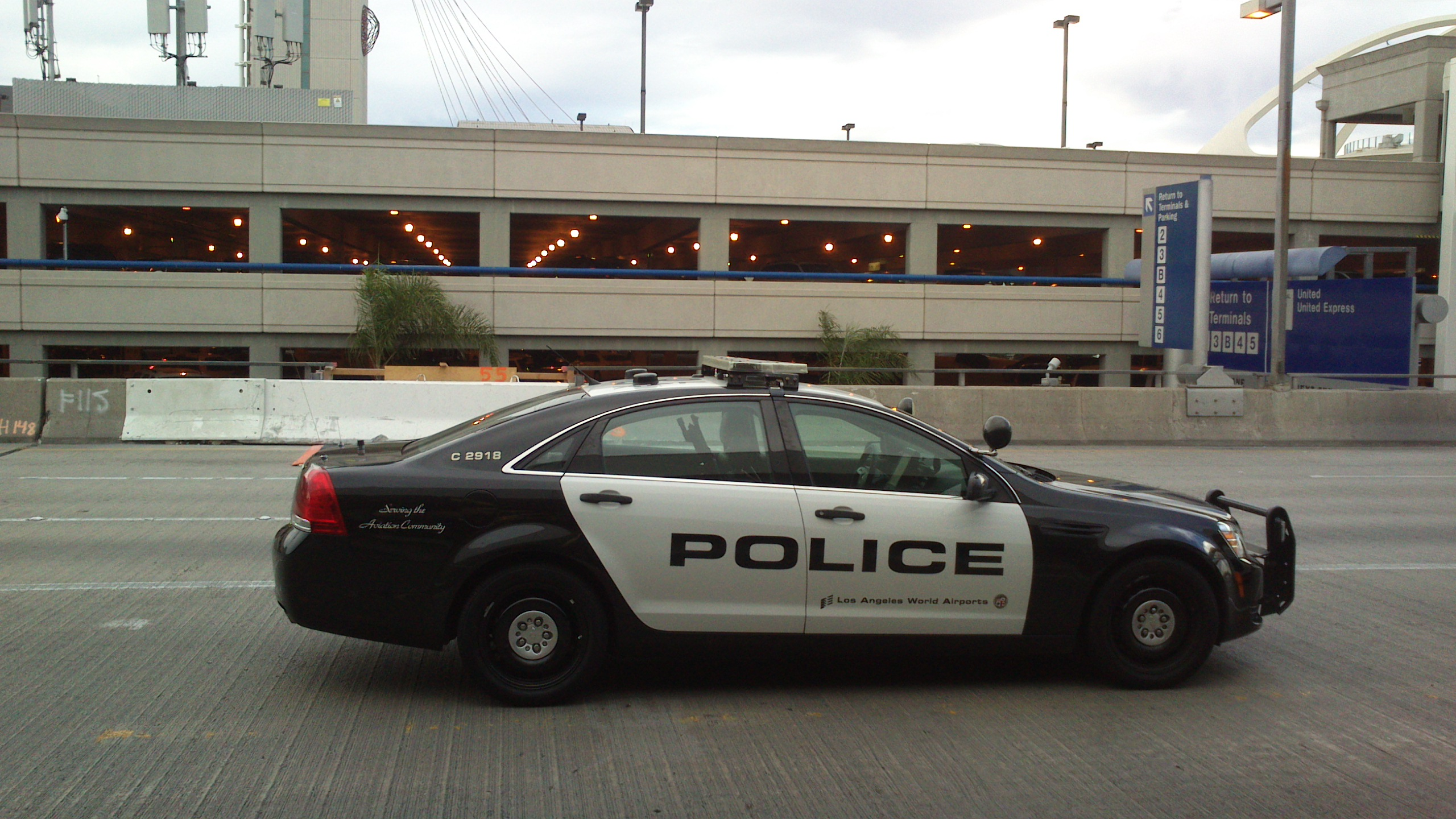
An LAXPD Chevrolet Caprice in 2014

Approximately 30 LAPD officers were assigned to LAX as a regular assignment from 1961 to the late 1990s. The number has increased since then but is believed to be less than 75. Their original purpose was to handle crime reports and police response. Over time, with increased passenger counts and increases in Airport Police staffing, Airport Police took on more of the police functions.

Although the relationship between both agencies has been stormy (typically in response to merger attempts), individual relations between line officers and up to the local command level have usually been cordial and effective. This has especially been the case during periods of crisis and emergency, with collaborative management, command, and control using the Incident Command System.

In response to a 2002 terrorist shooting incident at LAX, Mayor James Hahn directed that additional LAPD officers be assigned to the airport. These officers were assigned to passenger screening stations so as to free up Airport Police officers for other duties. The LAPD officers are trained by Airport Police for these duties and are expected to call Airport Police to resolve matters as they arise.

A number of LAPD officers are assigned to explosive detection duties in partnership with LAXPD officers in a joint unit. LAPD also provides additional specialized assistance on request. Several LAXPD officers are assigned as Detectives, working out of LAPD detective units on airport-related crimes.

LAXPD officers are trained at the Los Angeles Police Academy, and the agency training meets the same standards as the LAPD.

=== Merger attempts ===
At least six attempts have been made to merge the LAXPD into the LAPD since the early 1970s. A number of outside studies have been commissioned resulting in recommendations that the forces not be merged. The latest study was in 2004–2005 and contained almost identical recommendations as put forth in a 1984 study. In 1999, a new City Charter clause stipulated that the Airport Police would be under the autonomous control of Los Angeles World Airports. In May 2005, Proposition A was placed on the city ballot, calling for an amendment to the City Charter that would allow a merger with LAPD; the measure was soundly defeated at the polls. There has been some discussion of a merger of all law enforcement agencies in the City of Los Angeles with the LAPD.

== Selection and training standards ==
The Los Angeles Airport Police is a member agency of the California Commission on Peace Officer Standards and Training. All officers meet or exceed POST selection standards. All officers hired after 1986 meet full POST training standards. Prior to 1986, training was accomplished local and federal standards. The majority of officers hired prior to 1986 were sent to an in-service training academy in order to meet the additional POST standards. The last of those officers completed training in 1996. The Los Angeles Airport Police was slated to be designated as a State of California Penal Code Section 830.1 agency as of January 1, 2014.

Selection and training standards for Los Angeles Airport Police officers are virtually identical to those of LAPD. In 2004, the written tests were merged and the application process streamlined. It is now possible to apply for LAPD, LAXPD, and Los Angeles Port Police on one application, taking one written exam.

Airport Police officer candidates are sent to the Los Angeles Police Academy, Los Angeles County Sheriff's Department Academy, or the Rio Hondo Regional Police Academy. Training site selection has been largely based on course availability. In 2006, a decision was made to send as many candidates as possible to the Los Angeles Police Academy.

All Airport Police Officers must complete additional aviation security specific training as required by the State of California, Penal Code Section 832.1 within 90-days of being assigned. Supervisory training for sergeants has been held at the Los Angeles Police Academy since the late 1980s. Training for Airport Police detectives takes place at the LAPD academy. Training for lieutenants, captains and higher takes place at various locations in partnership with other California law enforcement agencies and the POST.

== Fallen officers ==
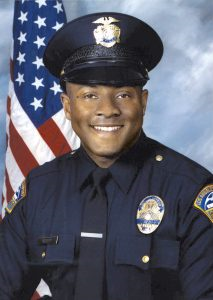
Officer Tommy Edward Scott

As of 2023, the LAXPD has only lost a single officer, Officer Tommy Edward Scott. Scott, 35, was killed by transient William Sadowski, 46, at LAX on April 29, 2005. An altercation occurred between Scott and Sadowski, who carjacked Scott's police cruiser; while attempting to stop Sadowski, Scott was dragged at high speeds before striking a fire hydrant, decapitating and killing him instantly. Attempting to flee, Sadowski crashed Scott's cruiser, stole an SUV from a passing motorist, flipped it over in another crash, and was arrested by police. Sadowski was found guilty of murdering Scott, and in 2010 was sentenced to life in prison without the possibility of parole.

Officer	Date of death	Cause of death
Police Officer Tommy Edward Scott	April 29, 2005	Vehicular homicide

== Chiefs ==
The Airport Police has a history of long periods where an acting chief has been in place. This is partially due to lengthy examination and selection processes, but also due to various re-structuring efforts that have taken place over the years in response to airport development, world events and political changes. Between January 1983 and November 2007, an elapsed time of over 23 years (287 months), acting chiefs have been in place for 85 months, nearly 1/3 of the total time. In the longest interim period a total of 27 months elapsed between the retirement of Chief Bernard J. Wilson (August 2005) and the appointment of Chief George R. Centeno (November 2007), with two acting chiefs serving in the interim.

=== Chiefs of the Los Angeles Airport Security Division ===
- George Dorian, Chief Security Officer, 1959–1979
- Albert Reed Jr., Chief Security Officer, 1979–1981

=== Chiefs of the Los Angeles Airport Security Bureau (after merger with Boarding Services Bureau) ===
- Albert Reed Jr., Chief of Security, 1981–1983
- George C. Howison, Assistant Chief of Security, (Acting Chief of Security), 1983–1983
- Frank C. Costigan, Chief of Security, 1983–1984

=== Chiefs of the Los Angeles Airport Police (after the 1984 name change) ===
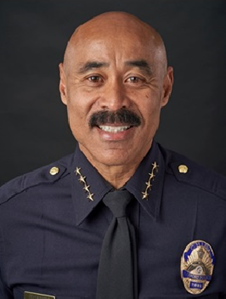
Cecil Rhambo

- Frank C. Costigan, Chief of Police, 1984–1984
- George C. Howison, Assistant Chief of Police, (Acting Chief of Police), 1984–1986
- Bernard J. Wilson, Captain, (Acting Chief of Police), 1986–1987
- Gilbert A. Sandoval, Chief of Police, 1987–1997
- John W. Bangs III, Captain, (Acting Chief of Police), November 1997 – April 1999
- Bernard J. Wilson, Chief of Police, April 1999 – August 2005
- Gary T. Green, Captain, (Acting Chief of Police), August 2005 – September 2005
- Brian A. Walker, Captain, (Acting Chief of Police), September 2005 – November 2007
- George R. Centeno, Chief of Police, November 2007 – January 15, 2012
- Michael T. Hyams, Assistant Chief, (Interim Chief of Police), January 15, 2012 – November 26, 2012
- Patrick M. Gannon, Chief of Police, November 26, 2012 – September 1, 2016
- David L. Maggard Jr., Chief of Police, September 1, 2016 – October 28, 2019
- Cecil W. Rhambo Jr., Chief of Police, October 28, 2019 – Present

== See also ==
- Los Angeles General Services Police
- Los Angeles Port Police
- Los Angeles Park Ranger Division
- Los Angeles School Police Department
- Law enforcement in Los Angeles County
- List of law enforcement agencies in California
- List of airports in the Los Angeles area
