= Colonel Tillinghast =

Colonel Tillinghast may refer to:

- Henry Tillinghast Sisson (1831–1910), colonel in the Union Army during the American Civil War
- Tillinghast L'Hommedieu Huston (1867–1938), baseball team owner who had been a colonel in the First World War
