= Mary Ann Lippitt =

American pilot, aviation business founder and philanthropist (1918–2006)

- Mary Ann Lippitt
- Born: Mary Ann Lippitt; June 29, 1918; Beverly Farms, Massachusetts
- Died: June 18, 2006 (aged 87); Providence, Rhode Island
- Occupations: aviator, businesswoman, philanthropist

Mary Ann Lippitt (June 29, 1918 – June 18, 2006) was an American pilot and philanthropist, who founded an aviation business after World War II.

== Early life ==
Lippitt was born as Mary Ann Lippitt in Beverly Farms, Massachusetts, the daughter of Senator Henry F. Lippitt and golfer Lucy Hayes Herron Lippitt. Her aunt was Helen Herron Taft, the wife of President William Howard Taft. Her uncle was Charles W. Lippitt, Governor of Rhode Island. Her paternal grandparents were Henry Lippitt, who also served as Governor of Rhode Island, and Mary Ann Balch Lippitt, for whom she was named. Her brother was military officer and politician Frederick Lippitt. As a young teen in 1931, she played in the national girls' lawn tennis championships. During World War II, she learned to fly planes.

== Career ==
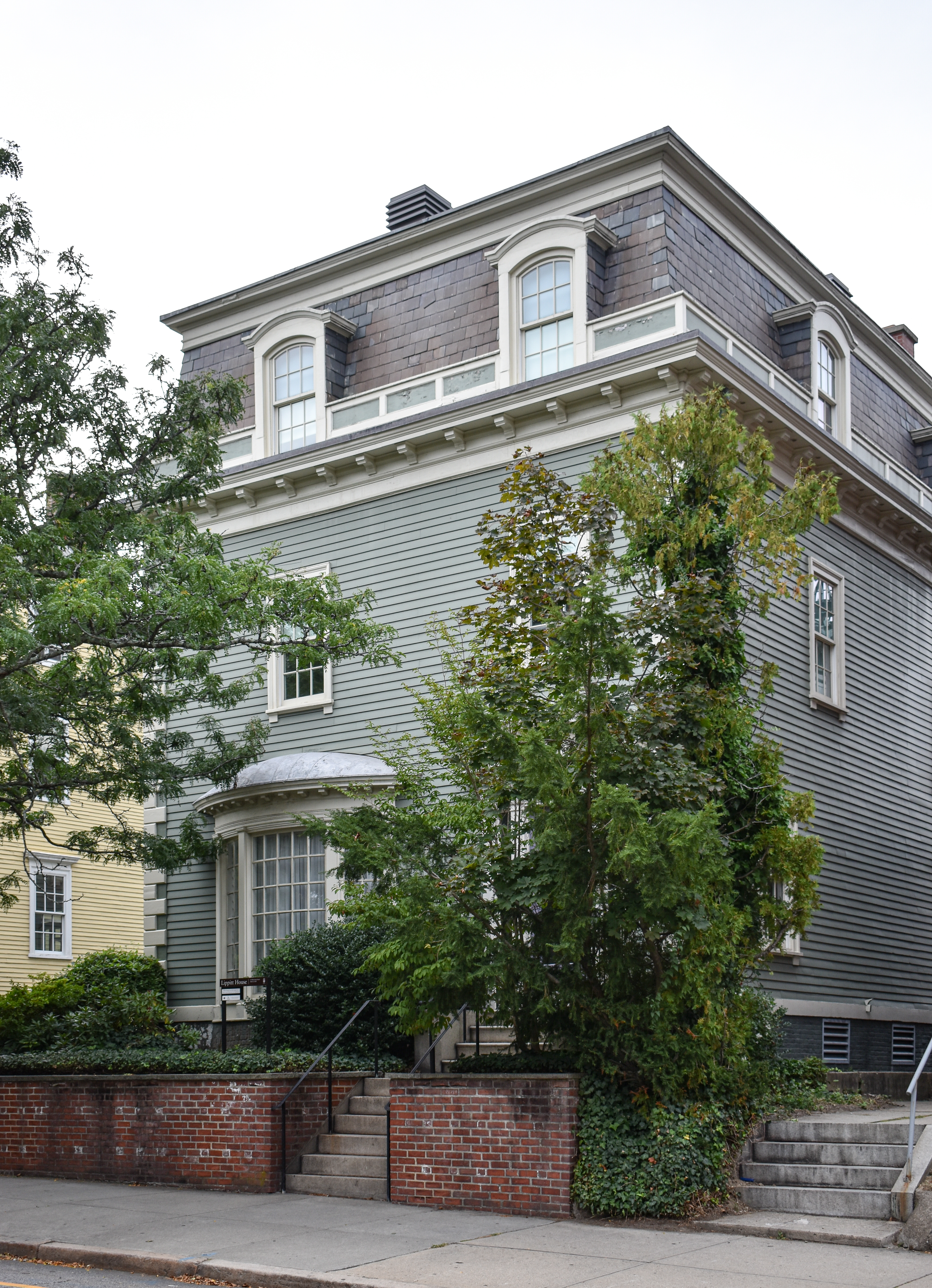
The house Mary Ann Lippitt and Frederick Lippitt shared in Providence, now owned by Brown University.

Lippitt worked as a flying instructor in Virginia and flew for the postal service during World War II.

In 1946, Lippitt formed Lippitt Aviation Services, a charter, repair, and instructional service with a fleet of four planes, based at T. F. Green Airport (formerly Hillgrove Airport) in Warwick, Rhode Island. Lippitt became as one of the first women business owners in Rhode Island. In 1972, Lippitt sold her business. She flew in the International Women's Air Race in 1956, but had to make an emergency landing in Buffalo, New York, in difficult weather.

In 2001, Lippitt donated $1 million to the Providence Public Library, where she had been a member of the Board of Trustees from 1985 to 1993. A branch of the library was later named for Lippitt. In 2004, she and her brother were awarded the President's Medal from Brown University for their philanthropy.

== Personal life ==
Lippitt lived with her brother until his death in 2005.

In 2006, Lippitt died in Providence, Rhode Island. She was 87. Lippitt is buried in Swan Point Cemetery, with her brother's. The home she shared with Frederick Lippitt was donated to Brown University after her death. The Center for the Study of Race and Ethnicity in America at Brown University is located in the Frederick Lippitt and Mary Ann Lippitt House. In 2013 she was inducted into the Rhode Island Aviation Hall of Fame.
