= 1880 Rhode Island gubernatorial election =

- April 7, 1880
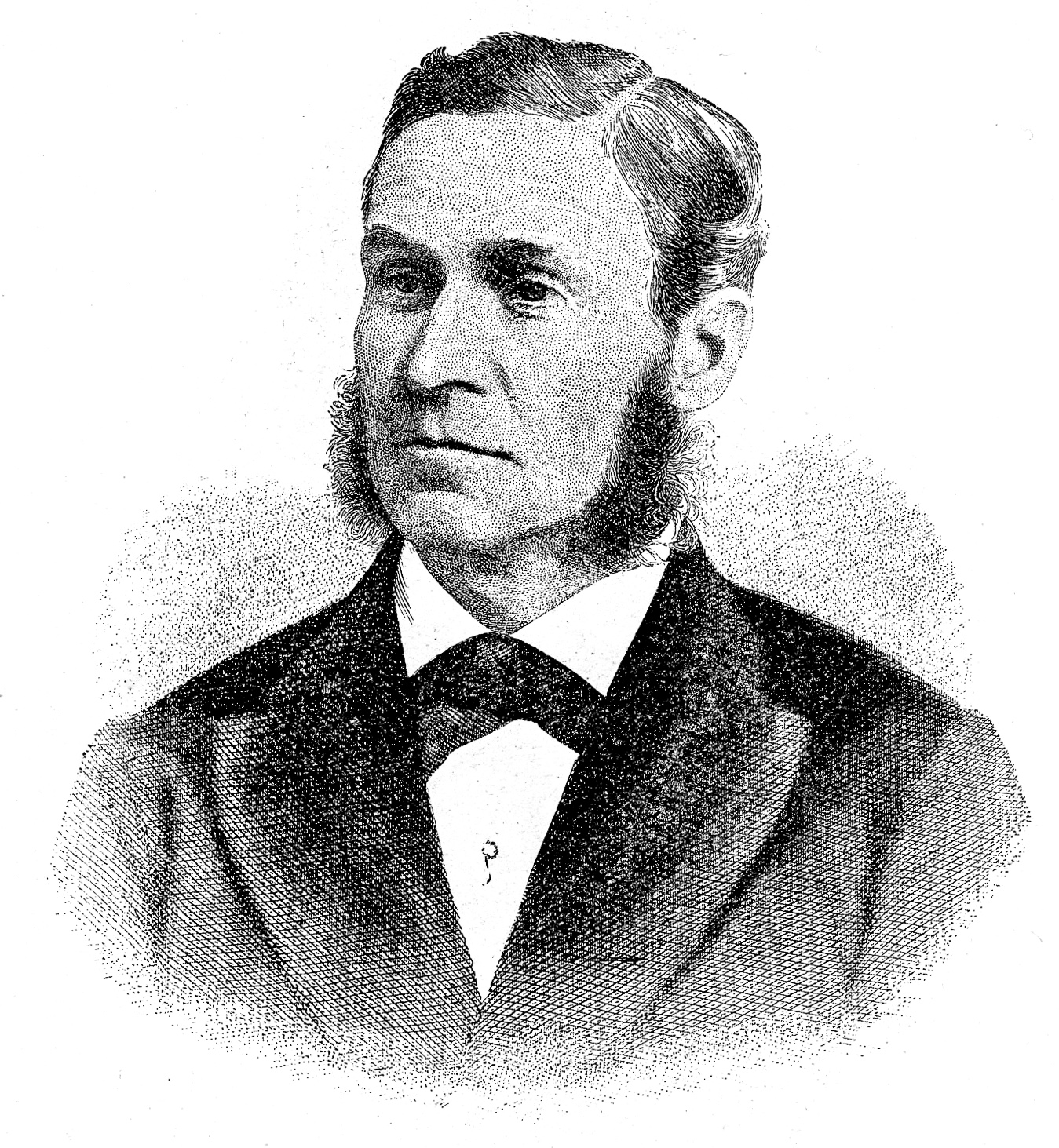

| Nominee | Alfred H. Littlefield | Horace A. Kimball | Albert C. Howard |
| Party | Republican | Democratic | Independent Republican |
| Popular vote | 10,224 | 7,440 | 5,047 |
| Percentage | 44.82% | 32.62% | 22.13% |
- County results Littlefield: 40–50% 50–60%
Governor before election
Charles C. Van Zandt
Republican
Elected Governor
Alfred H. Littlefield
Republican

The 1880 Rhode Island gubernatorial election was held on April 7, 1880. Republican nominee Alfred H. Littlefield defeated Democratic nominee Horace A. Kimball with 44.82% of the vote.

== General election ==
=== Candidates ===
Major party candidates

- Alfred H. Littlefield, Republican
- Horace A. Kimball, Democratic

Other candidates

- Albert C. Howard, Independent Republican

=== Results ===
1880 Rhode Island gubernatorial election
| Party | Candidate | Votes | % | ±% |
|---|---|---|---|---|
| Republican | Alfred H. Littlefield | 10,224 | 44.82% | |
| Democratic | Horace A. Kimball | 7,440 | 32.62% | |
| Independent Republican | Albert C. Howard | 5,047 | 22.13% | |
| Majority | | 2,784 | | |
| Turnout | | | | |
| Republican hold | | Swing | | |
