= Lippett =

Lippett is a surname. Notable people with the surname include:

- Ronnie Lippett (born 1960), American football player
- Tony Lippett (born 1992), American football player

== See also ==
- Lippitt (surname)
