= Henry Howard (Rhode Island politician) =

American politician

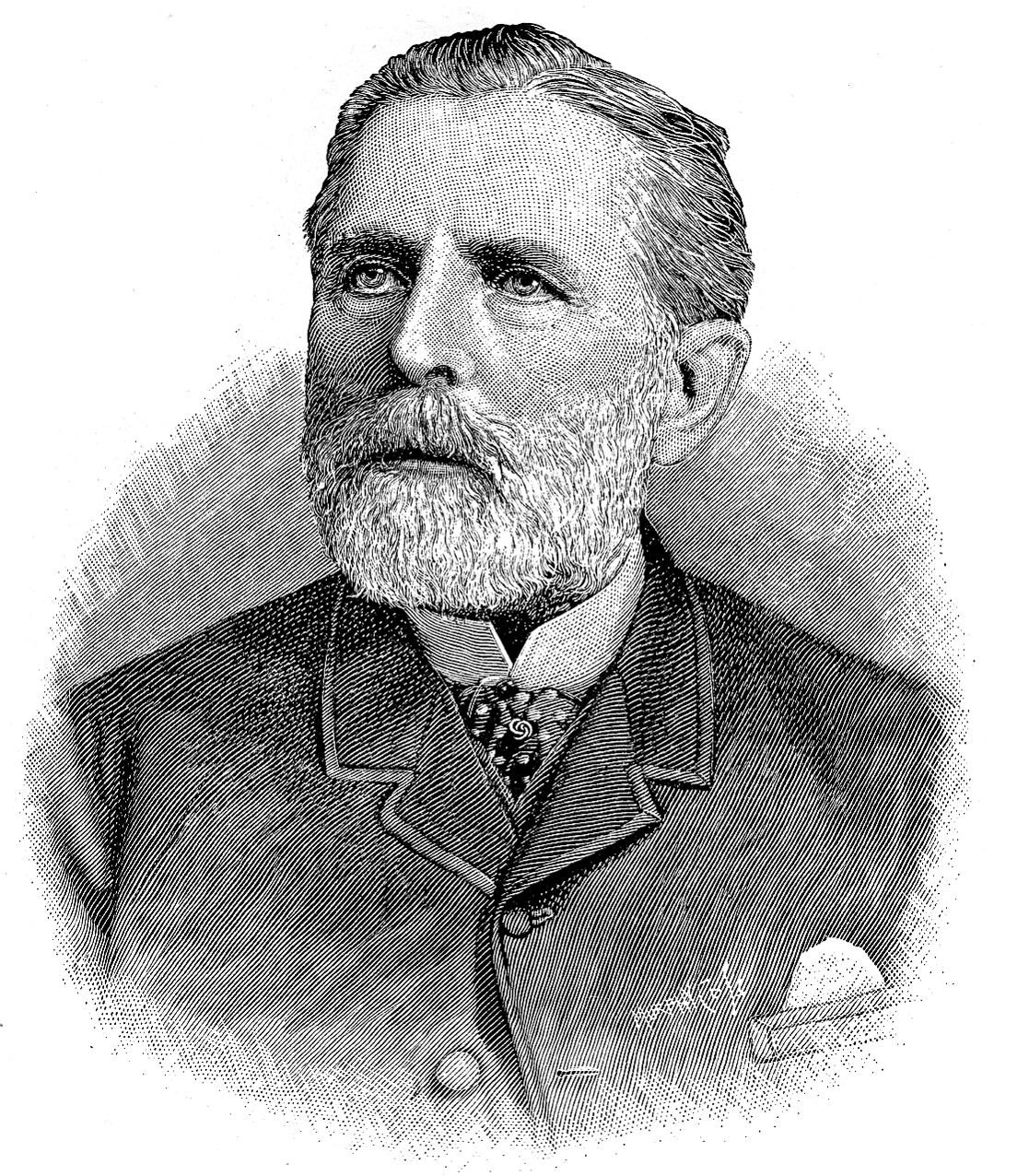

32nd Governor of Rhode Island
- In office May 27, 1873 – May 25, 1875
- Lieutenant: Charles C. Van Zandt
- Preceded by: Seth Padelford
- Succeeded by: Henry Lippitt

Personal details
- Born: April 2, 1826 Cranston, Rhode Island, U.S.
- Died: September 22, 1905 (aged 79) Coventry, Rhode Island, U.S.
- Resting place: Greenwood Cemetery; Coventry, Rhode Island
- Party: Republican
- Spouse: Catherine Greene (Harris) Howard
- Relations: Elisha Harris; Albert C. Howard
- Children: Jessie Howard; Elisha Howard; Charles Howard
- Profession: Lawyer; Politician

Henry Howard (April 2, 1826 – September 22, 1905) was an American lawyer and politician. He served as the 32nd governor of Rhode Island from 1873 to 1875.

== Early life ==
Howard was born in Cranston, Rhode Island to Jesse and Mary Howard. He attended Smithville Seminary and in 1848 he studied law in the office of future Rhode Island Governor William W. Hoppin. In 1851, he was admitted to the Rhode Island Bar and began a private law practice.

== Career ==
While serving in the Rhode Island General Assembly, Howard was a delegate to the 1856 Republican National Convention which nominated John C. Fremont as the Republican presidential candidate.

In 1858, Howard abandoned his law practice to open a New York City office for his father-in-law's business. When Elisha Harris died in 1861, Howard returned to Rhode Island to take a larger role in managing the company. When it was incorporated in 1865 as the Harris Manufacturing Company, Howard was named the president. His brother, David, played a role in the incorporation.

Howard remained active in Republican Party politics, serving as an elector in the 1872 presidential election which granted a second term to Ulysses S. Grant. In 1873, Howard was elected to the first of two consecutive terms as Governor of Rhode Island. He declined to seek a third term. In 1876, he served once again a delegate to the National Republican Convention, and in 1878 he was nominated by President Rutherford B. Hayes as an assistant commissioner to the Paris Exposition.

In 1878, Howard, with Pardon Armington and Gardiner C. Sims, established the Armington and Sims Engine Company, manufacturing high-speed piston valve steam engines. The consistent output of their engines prompted Thomas Edison to use them for his Pearl Street Station power plant in New York. The company's finances suffered from the depression following the Panic of 1893, and in 1896 it failed entirely, and its assets were sold to the Eastern Engine company.

In 1879, Howard founded the Providence Telephone Company, serving as its president for the rest of his life.

== Retirement and death ==
In 1900, Howard retired, and the Harris Mill in Coventry, Rhode Island was sold to Interlaken Mills, which was managed in part by Howard's son-in-law, Edward Bucklin. Howard died in 1905, and is buried at Greenwood Cemetery in Coventry, Rhode Island.

== Family life ==
In 1851, he married Catherine Greene Harris (1830-1907), the daughter of textile mill-owner and former Governor Elisha Harris. Howard and his wife had one daughter, Jessie, and two sons, Elisha and Charles.

Party political offices
Preceded by Seth Padelford	Republican nominee for Governor of Rhode Island; 1873, 1874	Succeeded by Henry Lippitt
Political offices
Preceded by Seth Padelford	Governor of Rhode Island; 1873–1875	Succeeded by Henry Lippitt
