= Lucy Hayes Herron =

American golfer

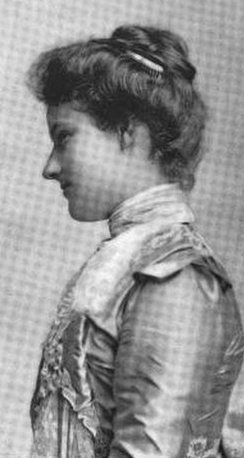
- Lucy Hayes Herron, from a 1903 publication.
- Born: November 8, 1877; Cincinnati, Ohio, U.S.
- Died: July 27, 1961 (aged 83); Providence, Rhode Island, U.S.
- Other names: Lucy Hayes Herron Laughlin, Lucy Hayes Herron Lippitt

Lucy Hayes Herron Laughlin Lippitt (November 8, 1877 – July 27, 1961) was an American socialite and amateur golfer.

== Early life ==
Herron was born in 1877 in Cincinnati, Ohio, the daughter of John Williamson Herron, a lawyer, and Harriet Anne Collins Herron. Her older sister, Helen Herron Taft, was the wife of President William Howard Taft and first lady of the United States. Lucy was baptized in the White House and named for Lucy Webb Hayes, wife of her father’s close friend President Rutherford B. Hayes. Some sources give her birth date as 1878 or 1879 (including her tombstone), but she was "born shortly after the election of Mr. Hayes" and named for the new first lady, which places her birth and baptism in 1877.

Her maternal grandfather Ela Collins was a Congressman in the 1820s, as was an uncle, William Collins. Another uncle, Isaac Clinton Collins, was an Ohio state legislator and a judge.

== Golf ==
Herron was a serious amateur golfer and a member of the Cincinnati Golf Club. Because she was from Ohio, she was considered a "Western" golfer: "Miss Herron, who is strong on the putting green, is another one of the formidable golfers, who, of both sexes, the West is sending out to test Eastern skill to its utmost," commented one publication at the time. Her swing was described as "beautiful" "quick, machine-like" by colleagues. In 1897, she finished third in the U.S. Women's Amateur. In 1899, she won the Women's Golf Association Trophy in Philadelphia. She reached the finals of the 1901 U.S. Women's Amateur, held at Baltusrol Golf Club, where Genevieve Hecker defeated her. The golfer Frances C. Griscom listed her among the top women golfers in the United States.

== Personal life ==
Herron's first husband was steel company executive Thomas McKennan Laughlin, the brother of ambassador Irwin B. Laughlin. They married in 1903, and she was widowed in 1910, when he committed suicide. They had two sons, William K. Laughlin and Thomas Irwin Laughlin. In 1911, she was rumored to be engaged to Archibald Butt, an aide to President Taft. She denied the rumors, they did not marry, and he died in 1912 on the Titanic.

She married her second husband, Senator Henry Frederick Lippitt, a widower, in 1915. With Lippitt, she had another son, Frederick Lippitt, who became a congressman, and a daughter, Mary Ann Lippitt, a pilot during World War II and later owner of an aviation company in Rhode Island. She was widowed again when Lippitt died in 1933. She died in 1961, in Providence, Rhode Island. She had a reported estate of eight million dollars, and left significant gifts to Rhode Island children's, medical, and cultural charities. Neither of her Lippitt children married; but both were major benefactors of Brown University, which jointly awarded them the President's Medal for their contributions. She is buried with her second husband and younger children at Swan Point Cemetery in Providence.

Her notable nephews and nieces included Robert A. Taft, Helen Taft Manning, and Charles Phelps Taft II.
