= 5th Rhode Island Infantry Regiment =

- Active: December 16, 1861, to July 1863
- Country: United States
- Allegiance: Union
- Branch: Infantry
- Engagements: Burnside's North Carolina Expedition; Battle of Roanoke Island; Battle of New Berne; Battle of South Mills

The 5th Rhode Island Infantry Regiment was an infantry regiment in the Union Army during the American Civil War.

== Service ==
The 5th Rhode Island Infantry Regiment was organized at Providence, Rhode Island. The regiment rendezvoused at Camp Greene in October, 1861, was transferred to Camp Slocum at Providence and mustered into U. S. Army service for three years as a battalion of five companies on December 16, 1861.

The battalion left Providence for Annapolis, MD to join Burnside's expedition to North Carolina. At Annapolis it was assigned to the 3rd brigade under Gen. Parke, embarked for Roanoke Island, NC where it participated in the battle on Feb. 8, 1862, and was also in the Battle of New Berne on March 14. It was then posted at Newport City until the siege of and assault on Fort Macon, in which it was active, after which it went into camp at Bogue banks and later at Beaufort, SC.

An additional five companies had been raised in Providence and mustered in on December 27, 1862. These companies joined the battalion in Beaufort where a new regimental organization came into being.

In April, 1863, the Sth went to the relief of Little Washington until April 14, when the enemy gave up the siege as hopeless and withdrew. Returning to New Berne the regiment reoccupied Camp Anthony and garrisoned Forts Totten and Rowan. In July the regiment ceased was reorganized as the 5th Rhode Island Heavy Artillery Regiment.

== Affiliations, battle honors, detailed service, and casualties ==
=== Organizational affiliation ===
Attached to:

- Parke's 3rd Brigade, Burnside's Expeditionary Corps, to April 1862.
- 1st Brigade, 3rd Division, Department of North Carolina, to July 1862.
- 2nd Brigade. 1st Division, Department of North Carolina, to January 1863.
- 2nd Brigade, 4th Division, XVIII Corps, Department of North Carolina, to May 1863.
- Lee's Brigade, Defenses of New Berne, North Carolina, Department of North Carolina, to July 1863.

=== List of battles ===
The official list of battles in which the regiment bore a part:

- Burnside's North Carolina Expedition
- Battle of Roanoke Island
- Battle of New Berne
- Battle of South Mills

=== Detailed service ===
==== 1861 ====
- Depart Rhode Island December 18
- Arrive at Annapolis, MD December 27

==== 1862 ====
- Burnside's Expedition to Hatteras Inlet and Roanoke Island, N.C., January 7-February 8, 1862.
- Battle of Roanoke Island February 9.
- At Roanoke Island until March 11.
- Expedition up Currituck Sound February 19.
- Advance to New Berne March 11–13.
- Battle of New Berne March 14.
- Operations against Fort Macon March 19-April 26.
- Moved to Havelock Station, Atlantic & North Carolina Railroad, March 19–20.
- Companies A, B, and C to Newport Barracks March 23, then the battalion moved to Carolina City April 4.
- At Bogue Banks April 6–30. Camden, South Mills, April 19.
- At Fort Macon April 30-June 30.
- At Beaufort, N.C., until August 7, and at New Berne until December.
- Expedition to Tarboro November 2–12.
- Rawle's Mills November 2.
- Demonstration on New Berne November 11.
- Foster's Expedition to Goldsboro December 11–20.
- Kinston December 14.
- Whitehall December 16.
- Goldsboro December 17.

==== 1863 ====
- Duty at New Berne until May 1863.
- Expedition to relief of Little Washington April 7–10.
- Duty in the defenses of New Berne until July.
- Reorganized as 5th Heavy Artillery. July

== Casualties ==
The regiment lost a total of 119 men during service (this includes casualties after it was changed to heavy artillery); 1 officer and 8 enlisted men killed or mortally wounded, 4 officers and 106 enlisted men died of disease.

== See also ==
- List of Rhode Island Civil War units
- Rhode Island in the American Civil War

== Armament ==
Soldiers in the 5th Rhode Island Battalion were armed with the P1856. (Note: Some of these rifles had been manufactured by contract in Windsor, Vermont by the Robbins and Lawrence Armory (R&L) They had sold gun making machinery (150 in all), to upgrade the new Enfield Armory in England. The British also awarded a later contract during the Crimean War for 25,000 Enfield P1853 and P1856 rifles. The contract's stiff penalty clause for missing the production schedule caused R&L to go bankrupt in 1859. Lamon, Goodnow and Yale (LG&Y) bought the factory to make sewing machines, but the onset of the war led them to continue producing the P1853, P1856, and licensed Sharps 1859s for the duration of the war. As with many of these volunteer battalion regiments, the 5th were issued a mix of imported and Robbins and Lawrence produced Pattern 1856 Enfield short rifle. These were the standard rifles for the British army Sergeants in line battalions and the rifle regiments.) The 1856 Enfield was a .577 calibre Minié-type muzzle-loading rifle that like all other nominal .577 caliber weapons could fire U.S. government issued .58 paper cartridges. It was used by both armies and was the second most widely used Enfield in the Union forces.

== Senior officers ==
- Colonel Henry T. Sisson - 5 November 1862 to 27 May 1863
- Lieutenant Colonel Job Arnold - 7 January 1863 to 2 March 1863 (transferred)
- Lieutenant Colonel George W. Tew - 2 March 1863 to 27 May 1863
- Major John Wright - 7 November 1862 to 25 August 1862 (resigned)
- Major George W. Tew - 1 October 1862 to 2 March 1863 (promoted)
- Major Thorndike C. Jameson - 2 March 1863 to 27 May 1863
