= 1876 Rhode Island gubernatorial election =

- April 5, 1876
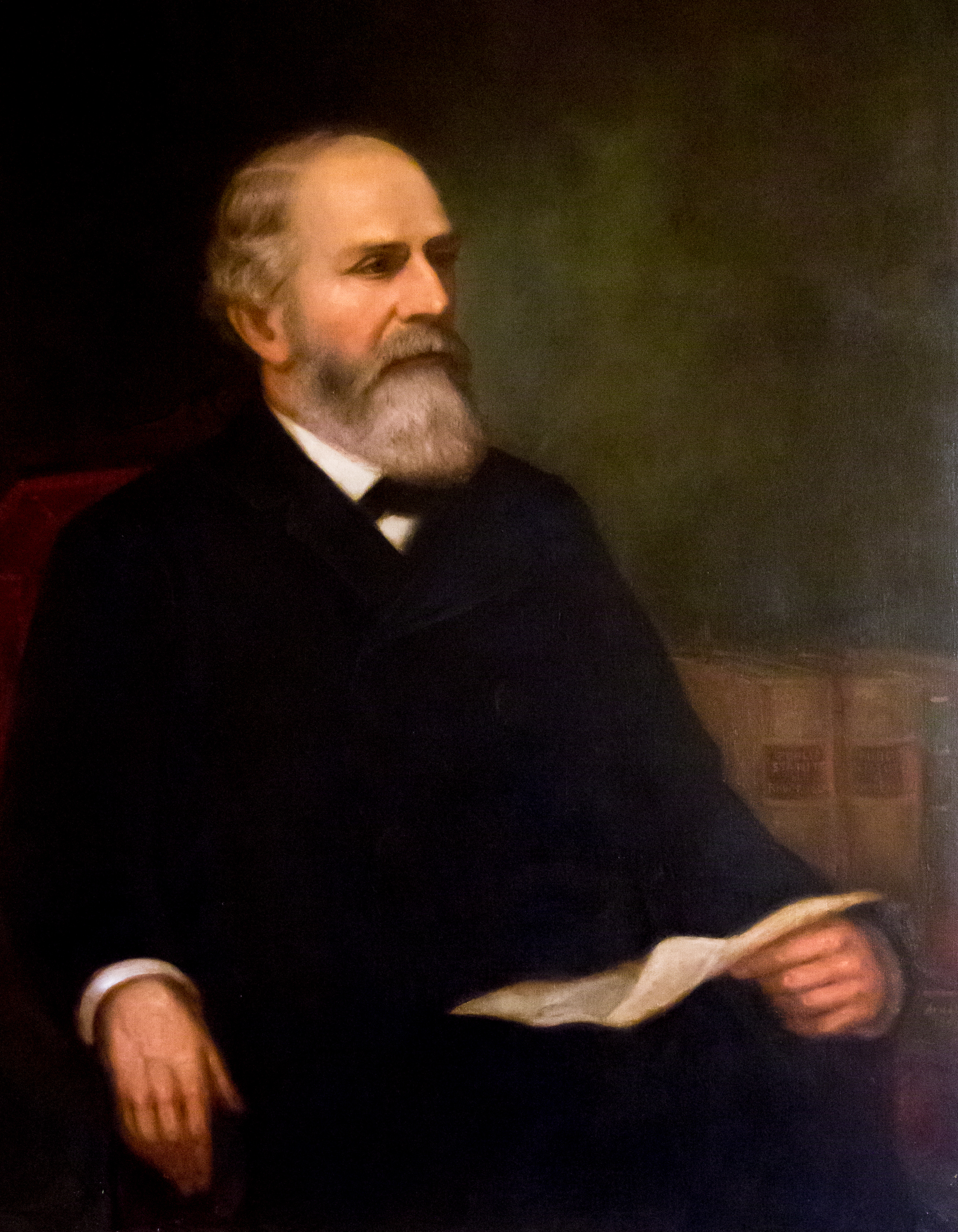

Nominee	Henry Lippitt	Albert C. Howard	William B. Beach
Party	Republican	Prohibition	Democratic
Electoral vote	74	29
Popular vote	8,689	6,733	3,599
Percentage	45.64%	35.37%	18.91%
- County results Lippitt: 40–50% 50–60% Howard: 30–40% 40–50%
Governor before election
Henry Lippitt
Republican
Elected Governor
Henry Lippitt
Republican

The 1876 Rhode Island gubernatorial election was held on April 5, 1876. Incumbent Republican governor Henry Lippitt defeated Prohibition Party nominee Albert C. Howard and Democratic nominee William B. Beach.

Since no candidate received a majority in the popular vote, Lippitt was elected by the Rhode Island General Assembly per the state constitution.

== General election ==
=== Candidates ===
Major party candidates

- Henry Lippitt, Republican
- William B. Beach, Democratic

Other candidates

- Albert C. Howard, Prohibition. Howard was also supported by Republicans opposed to Lippitt. (Note: 20th Century sources variously describe Howard as a "National Republican", "Republican and Prohibitionist", "National Republican and Prohibitionist".)

=== Results ===
1876 Rhode Island gubernatorial election
Party	Candidate	Votes	%	±%
Republican	Henry Lippitt (incumbent)	8,689	45.64%	
Prohibition	Albert C. Howard	6,733	35.37%	
Democratic	William B. Beach	3,599	18.91%	
Scattering		16	0.08%	
Majority		1,956	10.27%	
Turnout		19,037		
Republican hold		Swing		

=== Legislative election ===
As no candidate received a majority of the vote, the Rhode Island General Assembly was required to decide the election, choosing among the top two vote-getters, Lippitt and Howard. The legislative election was held on May 30, 1876.

Legislative election
Party	Candidate	Votes	%
Republican	Henry Lippitt	74	71.84%
Prohibition	Albert C. Howard	29	28.16%
Turnout		103	

== Bibliography ==
- Kallenbach, Joseph E.; Kallenbach, Jessamine S., eds. (1977). American State Governors, 1776-1976. Vol. I. Dobbs Ferry, N.Y.: Oceana Publications, Inc. ISBN 0-379-00665-0.
