= Albert Reed Jr. =

American actor

- Born: January 28, 1910; Greenville, Texas, U.S.
- Died: May 31, 1986 (aged 76); Bishop, California, U.S.
- Occupations: Television actor, law enforcement official
- Years active: 1969–1982 (as actor); 1959–1983 (in law enforcement)

Albert Reed Jr. (January 28, 1910 – May 31, 1986) was an American actor and law enforcement officer. He was mostly known for his recurring role as Alderman Fred C. Davis on Good Times. He also had a recurring role on the children's adventure series The Secret of Isis as Dr. Joshua Barnes and made guest appearances on The Jeffersons and Sanford and Son. On Sanford and Son, he appeared in the role of Grady Wilson, a cousin of Fred's, a role he played for just one episode; another role that involved a character named Grady Wilson, a longtime friend of Fred's, would later go to actor Whitman Mayo. He portrayed "Lieutenant Ned Ordway" in the original Airport movie (1970), a case of art imitating life, as Reed was also an airport law enforcement official.

Outside of his acting career, Reed also served with the Security Division at Los Angeles International Airport from 1959 to 1983, ending his career as the Chief of Security, 1979–1983. (The Security Division later grew into what is now known as the "Los Angeles Airport Police.")

== Filmography ==
Year	Title	Role	Notes
1970	Airport	Lt. Ned Ordway	
1972	Where Does It Hurt?	Dr. Radcliffe	
1977	A Piece of the Action	Randolph Ballard	
1982	Kapax del Amazonas		(final film role)
