= Albert Howard (politician) =

American politician

Albert C. Howard

Lieutenant Governor of Rhode Island
- In office 1877–1880
- Governor: Charles C. Van Zandt
- Preceded by: Henry Tillinghast Sisson
- Succeeded by: Henry Fay

Personal details
- Born: February 29, 1828 Cranston, Rhode Island, US
- Died: July 3, 1910 (aged 82) Atlanta, Georgia, US
- Party: Prohibition (-1876); Republican (1877-1880)
- Spouse(s): Ellen Murray (1853-1875); Jennie Randall (1883-?)
- Children: 6

Albert Crawford Howard (February 29, 1828 – July 3, 1910) was an American politician. Between 1877 and 1880 he was lieutenant governor of the state of Rhode Island.

== Career ==
Albert Howard was the younger brother of Henry Howard (1826-1905) who was Governor of Rhode Island between 1873 and 1875. The sources do not give much information about his life and work. He spent most of his life in Providence County, Rhode Island, where he was involved in commerce and politics. During the civil war he served as a captain in the Union Army.

In 1876, he stood unsuccessfully for Governor of Rhode Island as a National Republican and Prohibition Party candidate. In 1877, Howard was elected Lieutenant Governor of Rhode Island as a Republican alongside Charles C. Van Zandt. He held this office between 1877 and 1880. He was Deputy Governor and Chairman of the State Senate. In 1880, he stood unsuccessfully for Governor as an Independent Republican candidate.

After his time as Lieutenant Governor, he was no longer politically active. Albert Howard spent his old age in Atlanta, where he died on July 3, 1910. He found his final resting place in Providence. Howard was married twice and had six children.

Political offices
Preceded by Henry Tillinghast Sisson	Lieutenant Governor of Rhode Island; 1877–1880	Succeeded by Henry Fay
