= 1896 Rhode Island gubernatorial election =

- April 1, 1896

Nominee	Charles W. Lippitt	George L. Littlefield	Thomas H. Peabody
Party	Republican	Democratic	Prohibition
Popular vote	28,472	17,061	2,950
Percentage	56.40%	33.79%	5.84%
- County results Lippitt: 50–60% 60–70%
Governor before election
Charles W. Lippitt
Republican
Elected Governor
Charles W. Lippitt
Republican

The 1896 Rhode Island gubernatorial election was held on April 1, 1896. Incumbent Republican Charles W. Lippitt defeated Democratic nominee George L. Littlefield with 56.40% of the vote.

== General election ==
=== Candidates ===
Major party candidates

- Charles W. Lippitt, Republican
- George L. Littlefield, Democratic

Other candidates

- Thomas H. Peabody, Prohibition
- Edward W. Theinert, Socialist Labor
- Henry A. Burlingame, People's

=== Results ===
1896 Rhode Island gubernatorial election
Party	Candidate	Votes	%	±%
Republican	Charles W. Lippitt (incumbent)	28,472	56.40%	
Democratic	George L. Littlefield	17,061	33.79%	
Prohibition	Thomas H. Peabody	2,950	5.84%	
Socialist Labor	Edward W. Theinert	1,272	2.52%	
Populist	Henry A. Burlingame	730	1.45%	
Majority		11,411		
Turnout				
Republican hold		Swing		
