= Henry F. Lippitt =

American politician

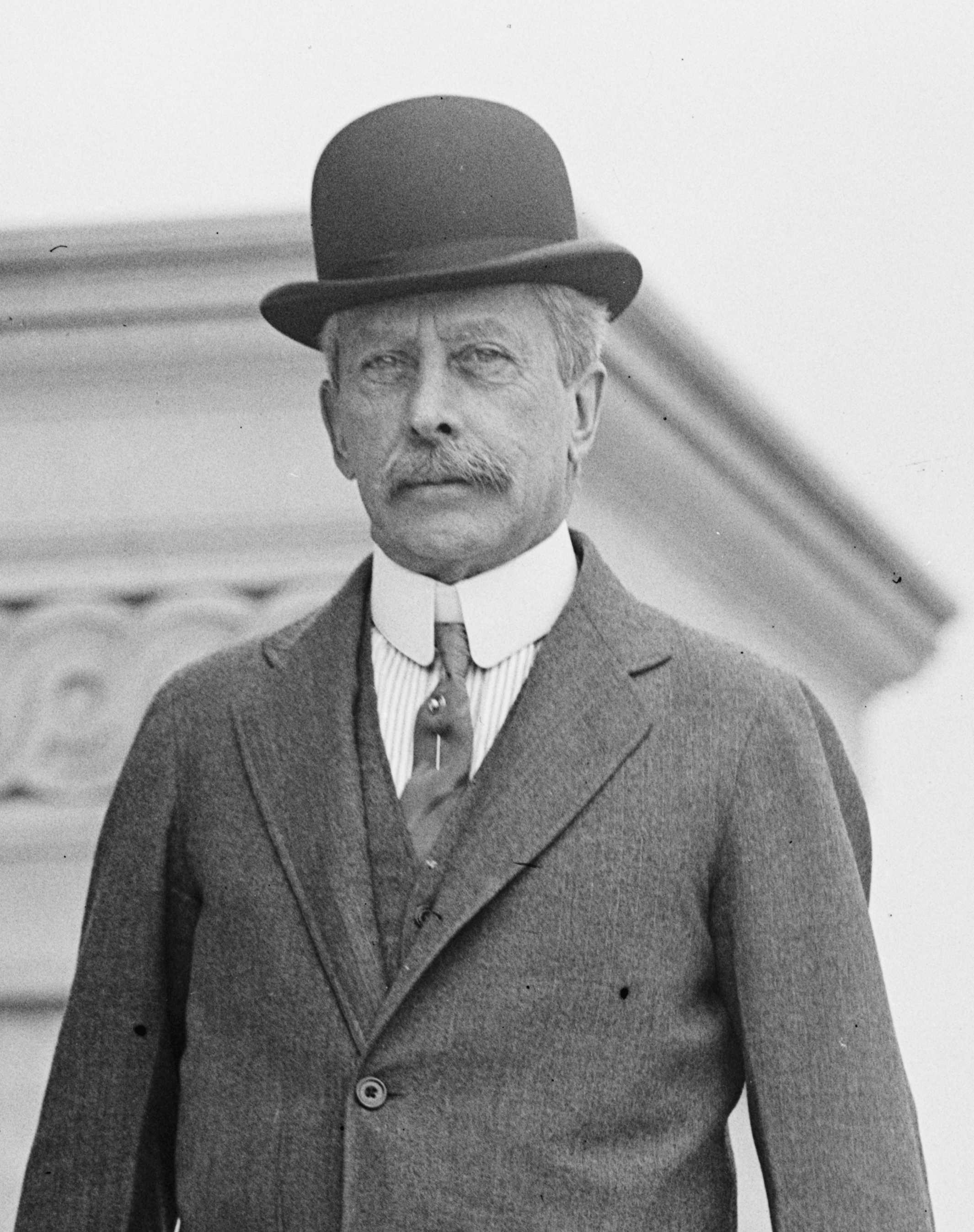

United States Senator from Rhode Island
- In office March 4, 1911 – March 3, 1917
- Preceded by: Nelson Wilmarth Aldrich
- Succeeded by: Peter Goelet Gerry

Personal details
- Born: Henry Frederick Lippitt; October 12, 1856 Providence, Rhode Island
- Died: December 28, 1933 (aged 77) Providence, Rhode Island
- Resting place: Swan Point Cemetery, Providence, Rhode Island
- Party: Republican
- Spouses: Mary Louise Bowen (m. 1881; died 1910) Lucy Hayes Herron Laughlin (m. 1915)
- Children: Louise Lippitt; Henry Lippitt; Frances Lippitt; John Bowen Lippitt; Frederick Lippitt; Mary Ann Lippitt
- Parent: Henry Lippitt
- Education: Brown University (1878)
- Occupation: Business executive

Henry Frederick Lippitt (October 12, 1856 – December 28, 1933) was a member of the prominent Lippitt family, which made its fortune in the textile business, and served as United States Senator from Rhode Island.

== Biography ==
Born in Providence on October 12, 1856, Lippitt was the son of Henry Lippitt and Mary Ann (Balch) Lippitt. He attended Mowry & Goff's, a private school in Providence, and received his Bachelor of Arts degree from Brown University in 1878. He was president of his graduating class and admitted to membership in Phi Beta Kappa. After graduation, Lippitt and joined his family's cotton textile manufacturing business.

Lippitt was director of the Slater Trust Company of Pawtucket and of several mill insurance companies. He was also vice president of the People's Savings Bank of Providence and a director of the Mechanics National Bank.

He served on the Governor's staff with the rank of colonel in 1888-1889 and was president of the New England Cotton Manufacturers' Association (now the National Textile Association) in 1889.

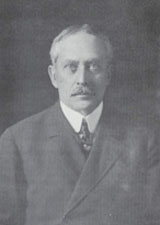
Portrait of Henry F. Lippitt

Lippitt was elected to the United States Senate as a Republican and served from March 4, 1911 to March 3, 1917. While in the Senate, he was chairman of the Committee on Expenditures in the Department of Agriculture (Sixty-second Congress). Lippitt had been elected by the state legislature, and was an unsuccessful candidate for reelection in 1916, following passage of the Seventeenth Amendment, which provided that U.S. Senators be chosen by popular vote.

After leaving the Senate, he again became actively engaged in the textile industry. He served as Chairman of the Board of the Manville-Jenckes tire fabric company of Pawtucket.

He was a member of the Squantum Association, Hope Club, Agawam Hunt Club, Rhode Island Yacht Club, New York Yacht Club, Larchmont Yacht Club, and University Club of New York. He was also a member of New England Cotton Manufacturers' Association, and in 1892 he joined the Rhode Island Society of the Sons of the American Revolution.

Senator Lippitt died in Providence December 28, 1933. He was interred in the Lippitt family plot at Swan Point Cemetery.

== Family ==
In 1881 Lippitt married Mary Louise Bowen, a member of another family prominent in the Rhode Island textile manufacturing business. Their children included Louise, Henry, Frances, and John Bowen Lippitt.

Following the death of his first wife, Lippitt married Lucy Herron Laughlin in 1915, a sister of former First Lady Helen Herron Taft and widow of Thomas K. Laughlin of Pittsburgh. They had two children: Rhode Island politician and philanthropist Frederick Lippitt and aviator Mary Ann Lippitt.

Henry F. Lippitt was the son of Rhode Island Governor Henry Lippitt and the brother of Rhode Island Governor Charles W. Lippitt. He was also a great-uncle of John H. Chafee and a great-great-uncle of Lincoln D. Chafee, both U.S. Senators as well as governors of Rhode Island.

== See also ==
- Frederick Lippitt (son)
- Mary Ann Lippitt (daughter)
- Lucy Hayes Herron (second wife)

== Sources ==
=== Magazines ===
- Babcock, Frederic L. (January 21, 1911). "Henry F. Lippitt". Fibre and Fabric. Boston, MA: Jos. M. Wade Publishing Co.
- "In Memoriam: Henry Frederic Lippttt, Sigma '78". The Diamond of Psi Upsilon. Vol. 20, Issues 2-3. Boston, MA: Psi Upsilon Fraternity. January–March 1934.

=== Books ===
- Marquis, Albert Nelson (1916). Who's Who in New England. Chicago, IL: A. N. Marquis & Company. p. 674.
- Spencer, Thomas E. (1998). Where They're Buried. Boston, MA: Clearfield Company. p. 142. ISBN 978-0-8063-4823-0.

=== Newspapers ===
- Bernstein, Adam (October 26, 1999). "Sen. John Chafee Dies at 77". Washington Post. Washington, DC.
- "Death Notice, Frederick Lippitt". New York Times. New York, NY. May 17, 2005.

Party political offices
First	Republican nominee for U.S. Senator from Rhode Island (Class 1); 1916	Succeeded by Robert Livingston Beeckman
U.S. Senate
Preceded by Nelson W. Aldrich	U.S. senator (Class 1) from Rhode Island; 1911–1917	Succeeded by Peter G. Gerry
