= 5th Rhode Island Heavy Artillery Regiment =

- Active: May 27, 1863 to June 26, 1865
- Country: United States
- Allegiance: Union
- Branch: Heavy artillery
- Type: Regiment
- Engagements: American Civil War

The 5th Rhode Island Heavy Artillery Regiment was a regiment which served in the Union Army during the American Civil War.

== History ==
The 5th Rhode Island Heavy Artillery Regiment was organized from the 5th Rhode Island Infantry Regiment at New Berne, North Carolina on May 27, 1863, and commanded by Colonel Henry T. Sisson. The regiment was attached to Defenses of New Berne, Department of Virginia and North Carolina until January 1865 when it was reassigned to the Sub-District of New Berne, Department of North Carolina until June 1865.

The regiment served by detachments in garrison in forts and defenses of New Berne, Washington and Roanoke Island, North Carolina. The forts garrisoned by the regiment included forts Totten, Gaston, Chase, Spinola, Hatteras, Clarke, Foster, Parke, Reno and Washington.

The regiment engaged in operations around New Berne against forces commanded by Major General William H.C. Whiting, CSA from January 18-February 10, 1864. Engaged in operations about New Berne and in Albemarle Sound from May 4 to May 6. Elements of the regiment engaged in a skirmish on the south side of the Trent River on May 5, 1864.

The regiment was mustered out of service on June 26, 1865.

== Senior officers ==
- Colonel Henry T. Sisson - May 27, 1863 to October 5, 1864 (discharged for disability)
- Lieutenant Colonel George W. Tew - May 27, 1863 to June 26, 1865 (mustered out)
- Major Thorndike C. Jameson - May 27, 1863 to February 2, 1865 (dismissed)

== See also ==
- List of Rhode Island Civil War units
