= Frederick Lippitt =

American politician (1916–2005)

- Born: December 29, 1916
- Died: May 11, 2005 (aged 88); Providence, Rhode Island
- Burial place: Swan Point Cemetery
- Education: Yale University (BA, LLB)
- Relatives: Henry F. Lippitt (father); Lucy Hayes Herron Lippitt (mother); Mary Ann Lippitt (sister); Nellie Herron Taft (aunt); John Chafee (cousin); Lincoln Chafee (cousin); Henry Lippitt (grandfather); Charles Warren Lippitt (uncle)
- Military career
- Allegiance: United States of America
- Branch: United States Army
- Service years: 1941–1965
- Rank: Lieutenant Colonel
- Units: Americal Division; 91st Infantry Division; Rhode Island National Guard; 43rd Infantry Division; 103rd Field Artillery Battalion
- Conflicts: Second World War; Korean War
- Awards: Bronze Star Medal; Purple Heart; American Defense Service Medal; American Campaign Medal; Asiatic-Pacific Campaign Medal; European-African-Middle Eastern Campaign Medal; World War II Victory Medal; Army of Occupation Medal; National Defense Service Medal; Armed Forces Reserve Medal; Rhode Island National Guard Service Medal

Frederick Lippitt (December 29, 1916 – May 11, 2005) was an American military officer, attorney, politician, public servant and philanthropist. He served in the Rhode Island House of Representatives

He was the scion of a distinguished Rhode Island colonial family, the son of United States Senator Henry F. Lippitt (1856–1933) and Lucy Hayes Herron Lippitt (1877–1961). He was the grandson of Governor Henry Lippitt and the nephew of Governor Charles Warren Lippitt. First Lady Nellie Herron Taft was his aunt. He was also a cousin of United States Senator John Chafee and Rhode Island Governor Lincoln Chafee.

== Education ==
Lippitt received his preparatory education at St. Mark's School and graduated from Yale University in 1939. He then attended Yale Law School where he joined the Phi Delta Phi legal fraternity. His studies were interrupted by his service in the U.S. Army during World War II. After the war, he completed his studies at Yale Law School and graduated in 1946.

== Military service ==
Lippitt took a leave of absence from Yale Law School and enlisted in the United States Army on August 6, 1941, four months before the attack on Pearl Harbor. He saw service on the island of New Caledonia with the Americal Division in 1942. He was commissioned as a 2nd lieutenant in the Field Artillery on October 20, 1942.

Later in the war, he served in Italy with the 91st Infantry Division. (Some sources state that he served in the Philippines but this is not mentioned in his official legislative biography in the Rhode Island Manual.) On July 24, 1944, he was wounded in action for which he received the Purple Heart.

Lippitt was promoted to the rank of 1st lieutenant by the end of the war and was promoted to captain on December 10, 1945. In addition to the Purple Heart, he was awarded the Bronze Star Medal for meritorious combat service.

Lippitt was discharged from active duty in 1946 and joined the Rhode Island National Guard on August 5, 1947. During the Korean War, he was mobilized with the 43d Infantry Division on September 5, 1950, and served with the division in Germany from 1951 until he was demobilized on August 23, 1952.

After being released from active duty, Lippitt reverted to inactive status in the National Guard and pursued a private law practice. He was promoted to major on February 2, 1953, and served for ten years (1953–1963) as the commander of the 103d Field Artillery Battalion (re-designated as 1st Battalion, 103d Artillery Regiment on 19 June 1961). He was promoted to lieutenant colonel on February 19, 1957, and retired from the National Guard in 1965, after a total of 24 years of military service.

== Legal career ==
After the Second World War, Lippitt finished his law studies at Yale. After passing the Rhode Island Bar, he was employed as an attorney at the Providence law firm of Edwards and Angell (today known as Edwards Wildman), where he rose to become the firm's senior partner. He retired from the firm when he entered the 1984 special election for Mayor of Providence. The special election resulted from the removal from office of mayor Vincent "Buddy" Cianci.

In addition to his legal career, Lippitt also served as a member of the Board of Trustees of the Providence Institution for Savings (a.k.a. Old Stone Bank). He served as a trustee of Rhode Island Hospital from 1954 to 1996. He was also a trustee of the Rhode Island School of Design.

== Political career ==
Lippitt was a lifelong Republican but ran twice as an independent for Mayor of Providence. His political philosophy could be best described as conservative on economic issues but progressive on social issues. He consistently advocated fiscal discipline and the protection of the rights of minorities.

=== State representative ===
In November 1960, Lippitt was elected as a state representative in the Rhode Island General Assembly, representing a district which encompassed the College Hill neighborhood of Providence. He served eleven two year terms as a member of the Rhode Island House of Representatives from 1961 to 1983, including ten years as House Minority Leader. As a legislator he was noted for his commitment to fiscal responsibility, civil rights and open government. He was also noted for his influence in the passage of the Rhode Island Fair Housing Act of 1968 and for his unsuccessful opposition to the imposition of a state income tax in 1970.

=== Later political career ===
Frustrated by the corruption of Providence politics under the administration of Mayor Vincent "Buddy" Cianci, Lippitt ran for mayor three times - once as a Republican (1982) and twice (1984 and 1990) as an Independent. He lost each election - the last two times by margins of less than 320 votes.

In 1982, Lippitt did not seek re-election as a state representative but, instead, ran as a Republican for Mayor of Providence. He finished third to Cianci, who ran as an independent, and Democrat Francis Darigan.

After Cianci was removed from office following criminal charges in 1984, Democratic City Council chairman Joseph Paolino became acting mayor and a special election was called. Lippitt entered the race as an independent, running against Paolino, State Representative Keven McKenna and businessman Emmanuel Torti. After Cianci was disqualified by the Rhode Island Supreme Court from running in the election, he endorsed Lippitt in the mayoral election shortly before election day. Lippitt narrowly lost the election to Paolino by 129 votes.

In 1985, Lippitt was appointed as the Director of the Rhode Island Department of Administration by the newly elected Republican governor, Edward DiPrete and served in the position until 1988. Shortly after Lippitt's appointment, the overwhelmingly Democratic Rhode Island General Assembly passed special legislation which permitted Lippitt's 22 years of service as a part-time state legislator to count towards a state government pension.

Lippitt was an unsuccessful Republican candidate for Lieutenant Governor of Rhode Island in 1988 when he was defeated by Democratic State General Treasurer Roger N. Begin.

In 1989, Lippitt was appointed by Providence Mayor Joseph Paolino, whom Lippitt ran against in the 1984 special election, as a judge on the Providence Housing Court. Lippitt resigned the position in 1990.

In 1990, at the age of 73, Lippitt ran again as an independent for Mayor of Providence. He was narrowly defeated (by a margin of only 317 votes) by Cianci, who was permitted to run for office again after serving a five-year suspended sentence. The other candidate in the race was Democratic City Councilman Andrew Annaldo. This was Lippitt's last attempt to win an elected office.

== Public service ==
Lippitt held numerous positions in the private non-profit sector. These positions included - senior fellow of Brown University, member of the Board of Trustees of Brown University (1963–1970), chairman of the board of Rhode Island Hospital, chairman of the board of the Providence Plan (see below), trustee of Rhode Island School of Design and chairman of the board of trustees of St. Mark's School. Brown University awarded him an honorary doctorate in 1977 and its President's Medal in 2004.

As chairman of the Providence Plan (a strategic urban planning initiative), Lippitt envisioned the successful Woonasquatucket Greenway Project which improved the natural scenery in blighted neighborhoods of Providence.

He also served Chairman of the Rhode Island Board of Governors for Elementary and Secondary Education for several years prior to his death.

== Personal life ==
Lippitt's father died the day before his 17th birthday. He never married and lived with his sister, Mary Ann Lippitt (1918–2006), a pilot who founded her own aviation company after the Second World War.

Mary Ann Lippitt took the first nurse's aide class offered by the Rhode Island Red Cross when she was still a teenager. During the Second World War, she was trained to work with psychiatric patients at Fort Devens, Massachusetts. In 1944 she was trained as a pilot and worked as a flying instructor in Virginia and served in the U.S. Air Postal Service during the war. In 1946 she formed Lippitt Aviation, and was one of the first woman business owners in Rhode Island and operated a charter service. She sold the business in 1972. She competed in the "Powder Puff Derby" - transcontinental race for women pilots. She also served as the chairman of the Board of the Rhode Island Red Cross and as a board member for numerous other non-profits. In 2013 she was inducted into the Rhode Island Aviation Hall of Fame.

== Memberships ==
Lippitt was elected as an honorary member of the Rhode Island Society of the Cincinnati in 1972. He became a hereditary member of the Society in 1989 after the death of a cousin who held the "seat" in the Society for Lippitt's great-great-great-grandfather, Captain Charles Lippitt. He was also a member of the prestigious Hope Club in Providence and the Phi Delta Phi legal fraternity.

== Death and burial ==
Lippitt died at the age of 88 at his home in Providence on May 11, 2005. His memorial service was held at the 1st Unitarian Church in Providence. He was buried near his parents in the Lippitt family plot in the Swan Point Cemetery. Mary Ann Lippitt died in 2006 and was buried beside him.

== Legacy ==
In his will, Lippitt provided for the endowment of two professorships at Brown University with a bequest of $3 million for each. One was named the Frederick Lippitt Chair of Public Policy and the other the Mary Ann Lippitt Chair of History. In addition, his will provided that his home on Prospect Street (valued at $2.8 million) be given to the university upon his sister's death.

Lippitt created the Frederick Lippitt Endowment Fund for the Woonasquatucket River Watershed.

The Center for the Study of Race and Ethnicity in America at Brown University is housed in The Frederick Lippitt and Mary Ann Lippitt House at 96 Waterman Street in Providence.

The Frederick Lippitt Prize for Public Service is awarded annually by the Brown University Department of Public Policy to a graduating senior.

On January 19, 2006, Lippitt was posthumously inducted by Mayor of Providence David Cicilline into the Reverend Martin Luther King Hall of Fame. At the induction Mayor Cicilline said of Lippitt:

The late Frederick Lippitt was a longtime advocate of civil rights and equality. As a member of the Rhode Island General Assembly, he pushed for the passage of fair housing legislation. He championed the cause of women and minority business owners as Director of Administration, and as the Chairman of the Rhode Island Board of Regents for Elementary and Secondary Education, Lippitt pushed for diversity among the regents and worked to improve the quality of life for students. The nomination letter credits Lippitt for helping the poor and disenfranchised and said Lippitt 'made a sustained commitment to Providence, a city he was unabashedly in love with.'

== Awards and honors ==
=== Military decorations and medals ===
- Bronze Star Medal
- Purple Heart (1944)
- American Defense Service Medal (1941)
- American Campaign Medal (1943)
- Asiatic-Pacific Campaign Medal (1942)
- European-African-Middle Eastern Campaign Medal with campaign star (1944)
- World War II Victory Medal (1945)
- Army of Occupation Medal with "Germany" clasp (1946 - retroactive to 1945)
- National Defense Service Medal (1953 - retroactive to 1950)
- Armed Forces Reserve Medal (1957)
- Rhode Island National Guard Service Medal - three awards (1954, 1957, 1962)

=== Honors ===
- Honorary Member of the Rhode Island Society of the Cincinnati (1972)
- Honorary doctorate from Brown University (1977)
- Lifetime member of the Board of Fellows of Brown University (1979)
- President's Medal, Brown University (2004)
- Inductee, Reverend Martin Luther King Hall of Fame (posthumously inducted in 2006)
- Inductee, Rhode Island Heritage Hall of Fame (posthumously inducted in 2006)
