= Henry Tillinghast Sisson =

American politician

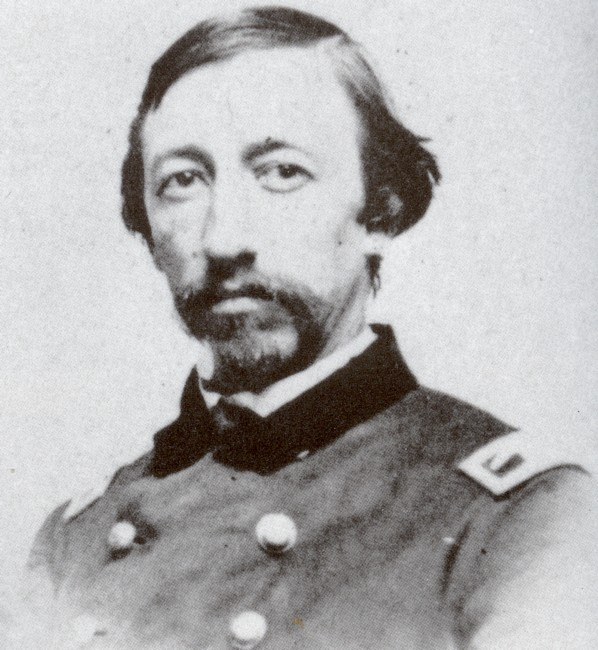

Lieutenant governor of Rhode Island
- In office 1875–1877
- Governor: Henry Lippitt
- Preceded by: Charles C. Van Zandt
- Succeeded by: Albert Howard

Personal details
- Born: August 20, 1831
- Died: October 19, 1910 (aged 79) Little Compton, Rhode Island, US
- Resting place: Union Cemetery, Little Compton
- Party: Republican
- Spouse(s): Nettie Walworth; Emily Josephine Brownell

Henry Tillinghast Sisson (August 20, 1831 – October 19, 1910) was a colonel in the Union Army during the American Civil War, a lieutenant governor of Rhode Island from 1875 to 1877 serving under Governor Henry Lippitt, and inventor and manufacturer of a binder for papers.

== Early life ==
He was a lifelong resident of Little Compton, Rhode Island, and inherited a stone mansion at Sakonnet Point. The mansion was originally built by his father for use as a hotel and recently has been known as the Stone House Inn.

In 1859 Sisson secured patent no. 18904 and in 1859 (reissued 1866) patent no. 23506 for the design of portfolios that used springs and strings to temporarily secure papers in a binder.

== Civil War service ==
Sisson was commissioned as a lieutenant and paymaster for the 1st Rhode Island Detached Militia (aka. 1st Rhode Island Volunteer Infantry Regiment) in May 1861 and served until the regiment was mustered out in August 1861. He participated in the Battle of Bull Run on July 21, 1861 under General Ambrose Burnside.

In April 1862 he was commissioned as major of the 3rd Rhode Island Heavy Artillery and commanded three companies (B, F and K) of that regiment at the Battle of Secessionville, South Carolina.

On November 5, 1862 he was promoted to colonel and given command of the 5th Rhode Island Infantry which became the 5th Rhode Island Heavy Artillery on May 27, 1863. Colonel Sisson was mustered out of service, on account of disability, on October 5, 1864.

== Post-war life ==
In 1864, he married Nettie Walworth in New Bern, North Carolina; she died in 1868. He then married Emily Josephine Brownell in 1870; they had four children.

He was elected as a Republican to the office of Lieutenant Governor of Rhode Island in 1874 and served from 1875 until 1877.

He continued to envision technical inventions, and filed an 1880 patent application for a balloon with electric lights that could either advertise at night or light up an area during a battle.

== Death and burial ==
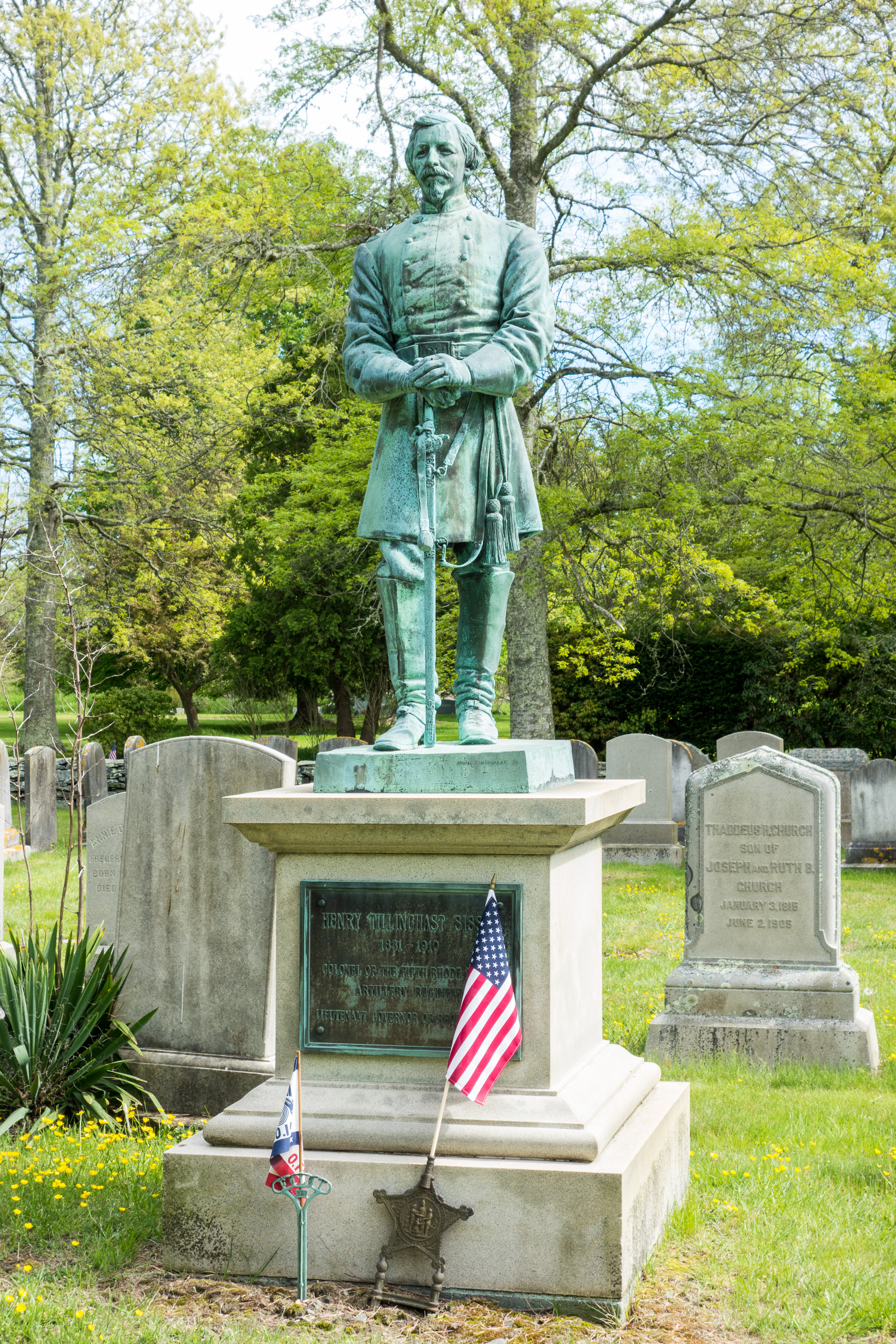
Sisson's grave

He died at his mansion in Little Compton on October 19, 1910. He was buried in a plot in Union Cemetery, across the street from the historic Commons Cemetery in Little Compton, Rhode Island.

About 1919, a life size statue of Colonel Sisson was unveiled in the cemetery by then Massachusetts governor Calvin Coolidge. The bronze statue was designed by Rhode Island sculptor Henri Schonhardt.

Political offices
Preceded by Charles C. Van Zandt	Lieutenant Governor of Rhode Island; 1875–1877	Succeeded by Albert C. Howard
