= Terrorism Early Warning Groups =

Los Angeles Terrorism Early Warning Group
- Abbreviation: TEW, T.E.W., T.E.W.G.

Jurisdictional structure
- Federal agency (Operations jurisdiction): United States
- Operations jurisdiction: United States
- Legal jurisdiction: Local and regional
- General nature: Federal law enforcement

Operational structure
- Headquarters: Los Angeles, California, U.S.
- Agency executive: LT John Sullivan, Designer and Founder

Website
- National Network of Fusion Centers Fact Sheet

The Los Angeles Terrorism Early Warning Group (also known as TEW, T.E.W. or T.E.W.G) was designed by LT John Sullivan. It provides local responders and community leaders with information on the current threat and future prevention. Terrorism Early Warning (TEW) Groups are a model of fusion center that emphasizes operations-intelligence fusion for all phases of response and community protection. TEWs serve law enforcement investigative needs, fire service response, and medical (EMS and hospital), as well as public health (epidemiological intelligence). The LA TEW was named among the "Top 100" innovative programs by Harvard University's John F. Kennedy School of Government: 16th Annual Innovations in American Government Awards (2003), and as a Finalist (top 5) in Mitretek Innovations in Homeland Security Award issued by Mitretek and the Ash Institute for Governance and Innovation at the Harvard Kennedy School (2004).

== TEW Mission ==
Each individual TEW shares the following attributes:

- Serves as the focal point for analyzing the strategic and operational information needed to respond to terrorism and protect critical infrastructure;
- Is responsible for information sharing and intelligence fusion;
- Performs net assessments to aid mission planning, decision-making, and allocation of resources in support of incident command during actual events.

Collectively, individual TEWs form a node in the TEW network. The overarching mission for individual TEWs and the collective network follows:

Overarching TEW Mission

To develop operational intelligence for area of operations, and contribute to the co-production of intelligence across the TEW and intelligence fusion community in order to prevent, counter and respond to terrorism and emerging threats by conducting indications and warning and operational net assessment.

(Source: National TEW Resource Center, February 2006)

== Sharing Intelligence ==
The 9/11 Commission Report illustrated some shortcomings in intelligence sharing. The TEWs are examples of state and local efforts that provide a mechanism for the collection, analysis and sharing of information. The National Network of Fusion Centers emerged from the TEW network and other fusion center initiatives.

== Resources ==
The LA Terrorism Early Warning (TEW) case study:

John P. Sullivan and Alain Bauer, Eds. Terrorism Early Warning: 10 Years of Achievement in Fighting Terrorism and Crime, Los Angeles: Los Angeles Sheriff's Department, 2008.

Also a resource guide:

National TEW [Terrorism Early Warning Group] Resource Center, Resource Guide: Book One: TEW Concept and Overview, 2005.

These Masters theses looked at the effort:

1) Sunchar M. Rust, "Collaborative network evolution the Los Angeles terrorism early warning group," Masters Thesis, Monterey: Naval Postgraduate School, March 2006.

2) Michael Grossman, "PERCEPTION OR FACT: MEASURING THE EFFECTIVENESS OF THE TERRORISM EARLY WARNING (TEW) GROUP," Master's Thesis, Monterrey: Naval Postgraduate School, September 2005.

3) William A. Forsyth, "STATE AND LOCAL INTELLIGENCE FUSION CENTERS: AN EVALUATIVE APPROACH IN MODELING A STATE FUSION CENTER," Master's Thesis, Monterey: Naval Postgraduate School, September 2005.

4) James Madia, "Homeland Security Organizations: Design Contingencies in Complex Environments," Master's Thesis, Monterey: Naval Postgraduate School, September 2011.

== See also ==
- Terrorism Research Center

== TEW Conferences ==
Los Angeles Terrorism Early Warning Group Conference. Terrorism, Global Security, and the Law. 2005

== Academic Papers ==
John P. Sullivan & James J. Wirtz (2008), "Terrorism Early Warning and Counterterrorism Intelligence," International Journal of Intelligence and CounterIntelligence, 21:1, 13-25
