= Charles W. Lippitt =

American politician

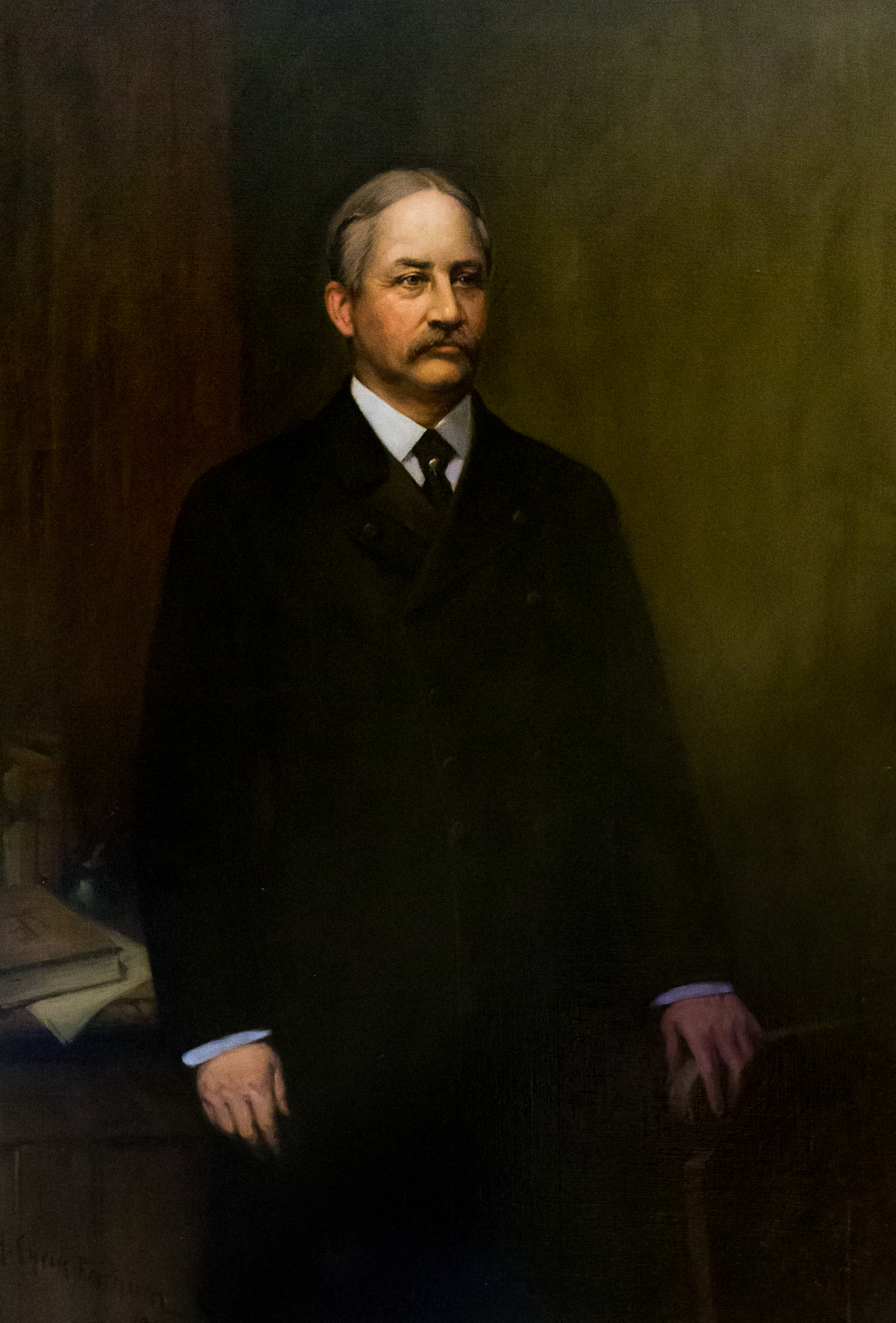

44th Governor of Rhode Island
- In office May 29, 1895 – May 25, 1897
- Lieutenant Governor: Edwin Allen
- Preceded by: D. Russell Brown
- Succeeded by: Elisha Dyer, Jr.

Personal details
- Born: October 8, 1846 Providence, Rhode Island, U.S.
- Died: April 4, 1924 (aged 77) Yorktown, New York, U.S.
- Resting place: Swan Point Cemetery
- Party: Republican
- Spouse: Margaret Barbara Farnum
- Children: 2
- Parent(s): Henry Lippitt, Mary Ann Balch
- Education: Brown University
- Profession: Industrialist

Charles Warren Lippitt (October 8, 1846 – April 4, 1924) was an American politician and the 44th governor of Rhode Island.

== Early life ==
Lippitt was born in Providence, Rhode Island on October 8, 1846. He graduated from Brown University. Later, he was involved in his father's cotton and woolen manufacturing firm.

== Family ==
His father, Henry Lippitt, was governor of Rhode Island from 1875 to 1877 and his brother Henry F. Lippitt was a United States senator from Rhode Island. He married Margaret B. Farnum on February 23, 1886. She was a leader of the Rhode Island Association Opposed to Woman Suffrage.

His son, Charles Warren Lippitt, Jr. (1894–1970), served as a sergeant in the 103rd Field Artillery Regiment during the First World War. He then attended Harvard College and graduated in the class of 1921. He later served in World War II and rose to the rank of colonel in the Army Reserve where he served until 1966. He pursued a career in business in New York City. His son, Charles Warren Lippitt III, was a captain in the United States Air Force and died on active duty in 1968.

Another son, Alexander Farnum Lippitt (b. 1896), attended Harvard from 1916 to 1917. He enlisted in the Army in August 1917 and served as a 1st Lieutenant in the 166th Infantry Regiment of the 42nd Division. He was awarded the Distinguished Service Cross for leading his men in a counterattack against the Germans. He was wounded in action, sent back to the United States and died at Fort Mott in Cape May, New Jersey on October 6, 1918. Lippitt Park in Providence was dedicated in his memory.

== Political career ==
Lippitt served as a military aide, with the rank of colonel, to his father during his father's term of office as governor from 1875 to 1877.

Lippitt served as Governor of Rhode Island from May 29, 1895 to May 25, 1897.

He was an unsuccessful candidate for Republican nomination for Vice President in 1896.

== Lippitt's Castle ==
In 1899 Lippitt built an immense castle style brick mansion, near Bailey's Beach in Newport, Rhode Island, named The Breakwater but commonly referred to as "Lippitt's Castle". After Lippitt's death his son Charles Jr. had the castle torn down and sold the land. It was replaced in 1926 by a mansion named The Waves on the same foundation as the castle. The Waves was designed by renowned architect John Russell Pope as his own summer residence and was converted to condominiums in the late 20th Century. Bricks from Lippitt's Castle can still be found in the waters near where the mansion once stood.

== Memberships ==
Lippitt joined the Rhode Island Society of the Sons of the American Revolution in 1896 and served as the Society's president from 1908 to 1909. In 1897 he was admitted as an hereditary member of the Rhode Island Society of the Cincinnati by right of his descent from Captain Charles Lippitt who served in Richmond's Regiment during the Revolution.

His sons, Colonel Charles Warren Lippitt, Jr. (1894-1970) and Gorton Thayer Lippitt, also joined the Sons of the American Revolution. Charles, Jr. became a member of the Society of the Cincinnati after his father's death and served as its President General from 1965 to 1968 and Gorton became a member after Charles' death in 1970. Upon the death of Gorton, in 1978, the family's "seat" in the Society was "inherited" by their cousin Frederick Lippitt, who held the seat until his death in 2005.

== Death ==
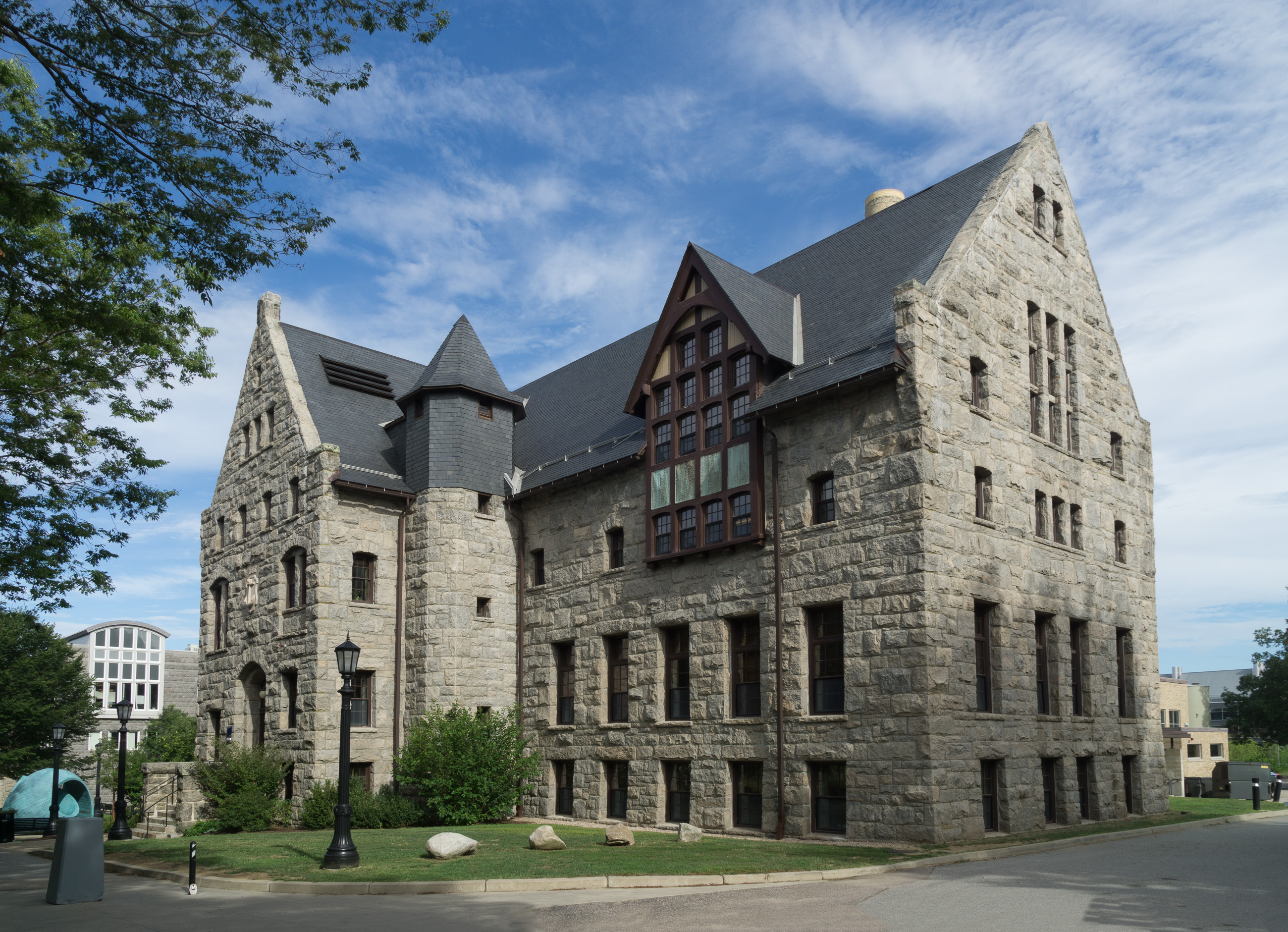
URI's Lippitt Hall was named after Governor Lippitt.

Governor Charles Warren Lippitt died in Yorktown, New York on April 4, 1924. He was interred in the Swan Point Cemetery in Providence.

== Legacy ==
Lippitt Hall on the central quad of the University of Rhode Island in Kingston is named after Governor Charles W. Lippitt.

== Sources ==
- Sobel, Robert and John Raimo. Biographical Directory of the Governors of the United States, 1789-1978. Greenwood Press, 1988. ISBN 0-313-28093-2

Party political offices
Preceded by Daniel Russell Brown	Republican nominee for Governor of Rhode Island; 1895, 1896	Succeeded by Elisha Dyer Jr.
Political offices
Preceded by Daniel Russell Brown	Governor of Rhode Island; 1895–1897	Succeeded by Elisha Dyer, Jr.
