= Henry Lippitt =

American politician

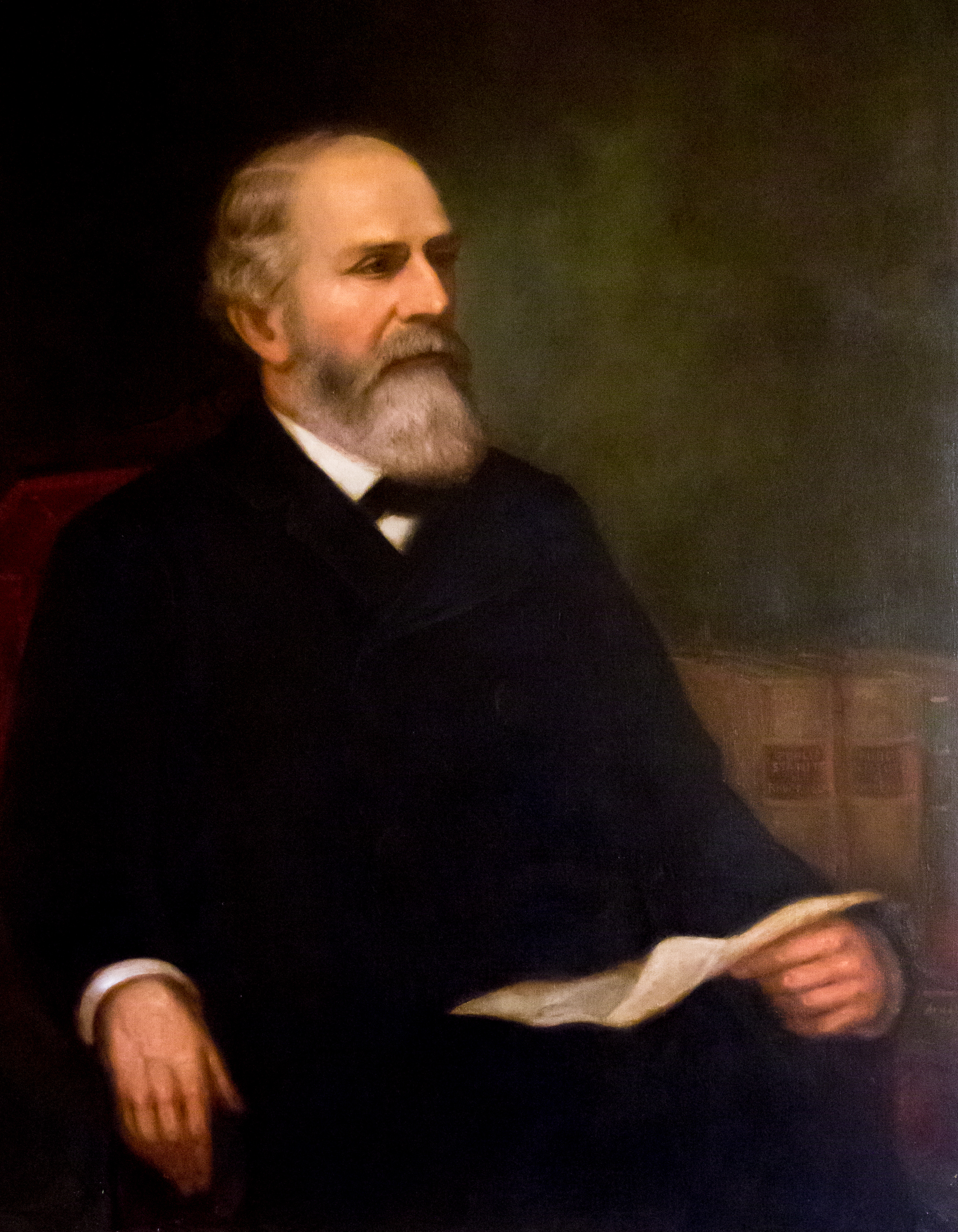

33rd Governor of Rhode Island
- In office May 25, 1875 – May 29, 1877
- Lieutenant: Henry T. Sisson
- Preceded by: Henry Howard
- Succeeded by: Charles Van Zandt

Personal details
- Born: October 9, 1818
- Died: June 5, 1891 (aged 72)
- Resting place: Swan Point Cemetery
- Party: Republican
- Spouse: Mary Ann Balch
- Children: Charles Warren Lippitt, Henry F. Lippitt, Jeanie Lippitt Weeden, Mary Balch (Lippitt) Steedman, Robert Lincoln Lippitt
- Parent(s): Warren Lippitt, Eliza (Seamans) Lippitt
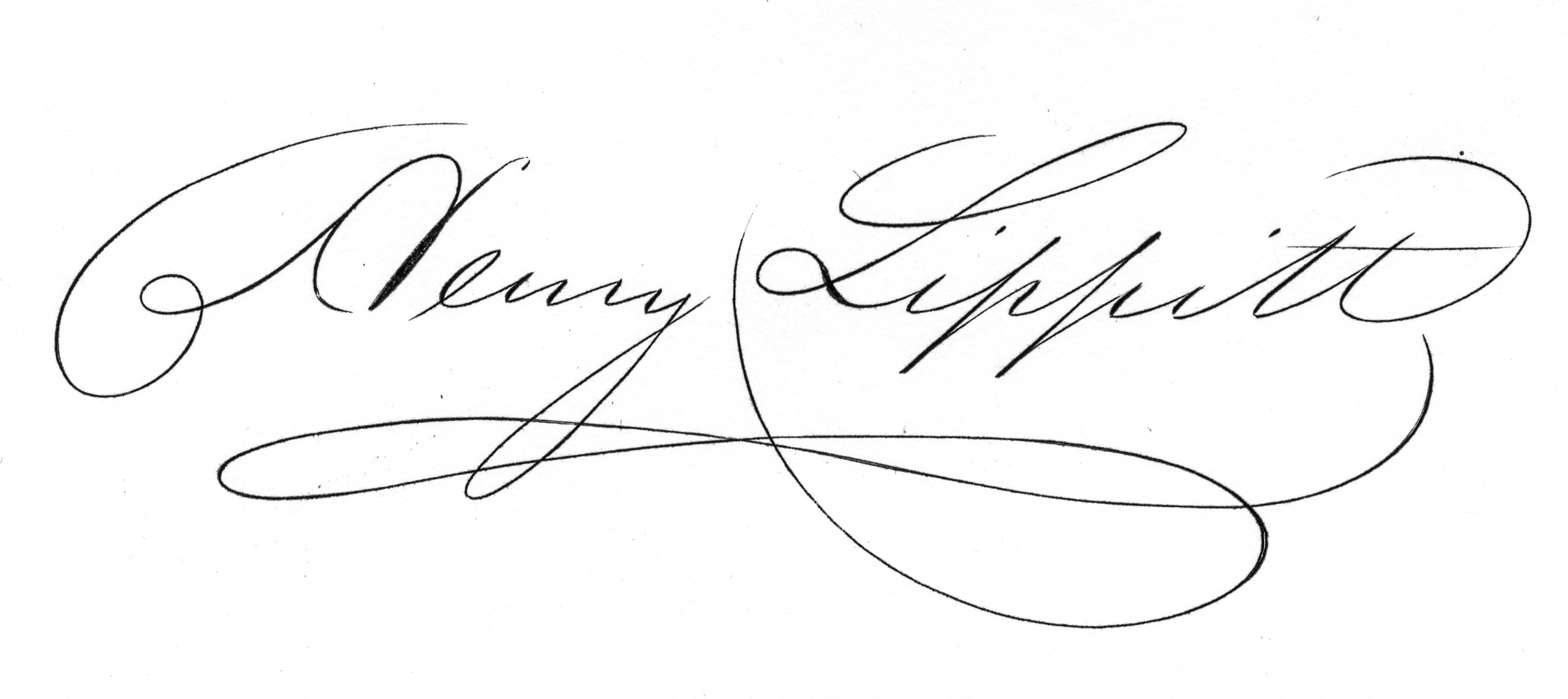
- Signature

Henry Lippitt (October 9, 1818 – June 5, 1891) was the 33rd governor of Rhode Island from 1875 to 1877.

== Family ==
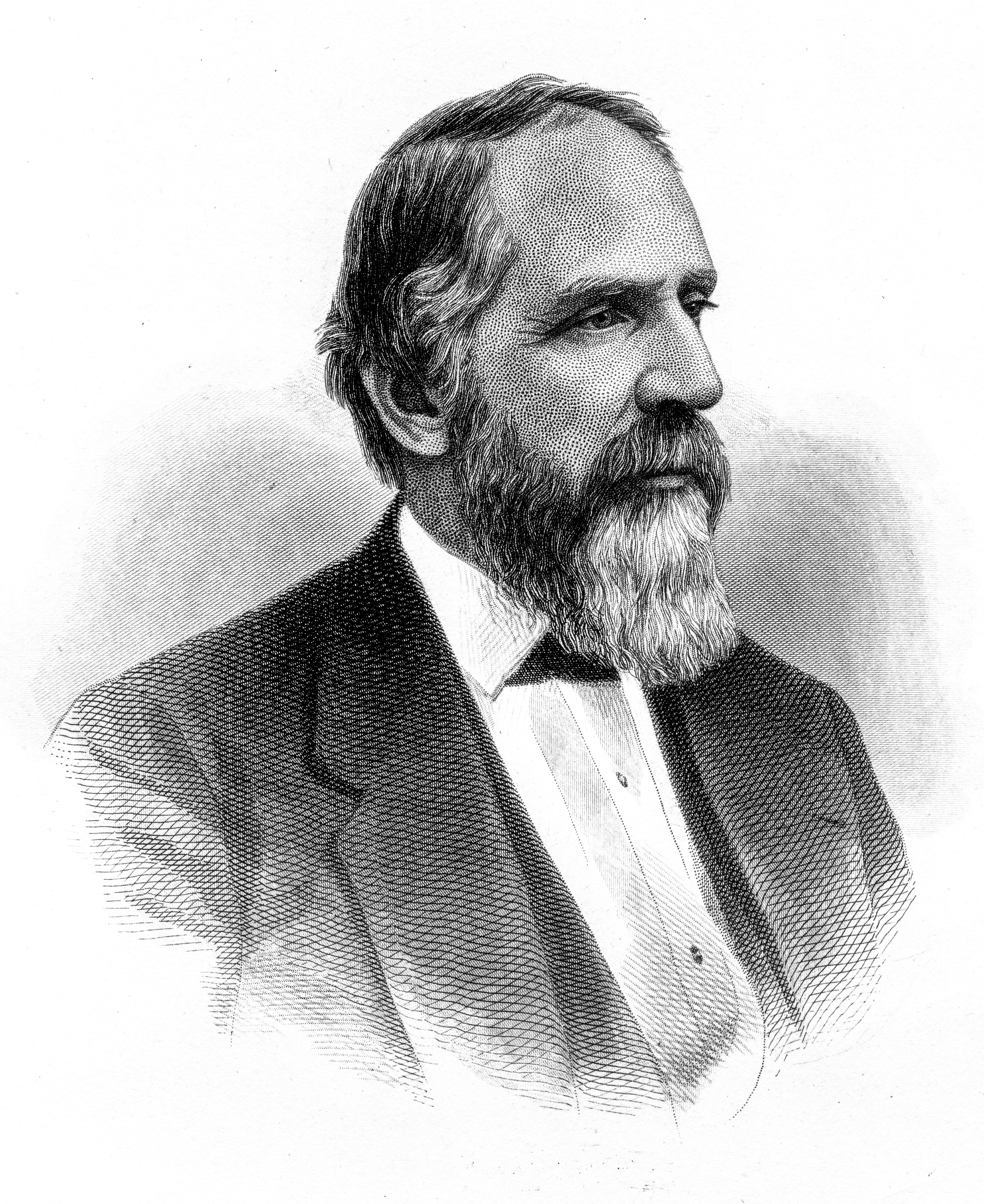

Lippitt was the son of Warren Lippitt and Eliza (Seamans) Lippitt, married to Mary Ann Balch. Lippitt was the father of Charles Warren Lippitt, another Rhode Island Governor, and the father of Henry F. Lippitt, a U.S. Senator from Rhode Island; the grandfather of Rhode Island House Minority Leader Frederick Lippitt; the great-grandfather of John Chafee, another Rhode Island Governor, U.S. Senator and Secretary of the Navy; and the great-great-grandfather of Lincoln Chafee, the former U.S. Senator and governor of Rhode Island.

== Business ==
Lippitt was the president of the Lippitt Woolen Company and owned various textile mills, including Lippitt Mill in West Warwick and the Hanora Mills and Social Mill in Woonsocket. He was also a vice president of the Rhode Island Institution for Savings and the president of the Rhode Island National Bank.

== Governorship ==
Lippitt was a Republican and succeeded fellow Republican Henry Howard as governor of Rhode Island on May 25, 1875. He was governor for two years and was then succeeded by another Republican, Charles C. Van Zandt, on May 29, 1877.

== Home ==
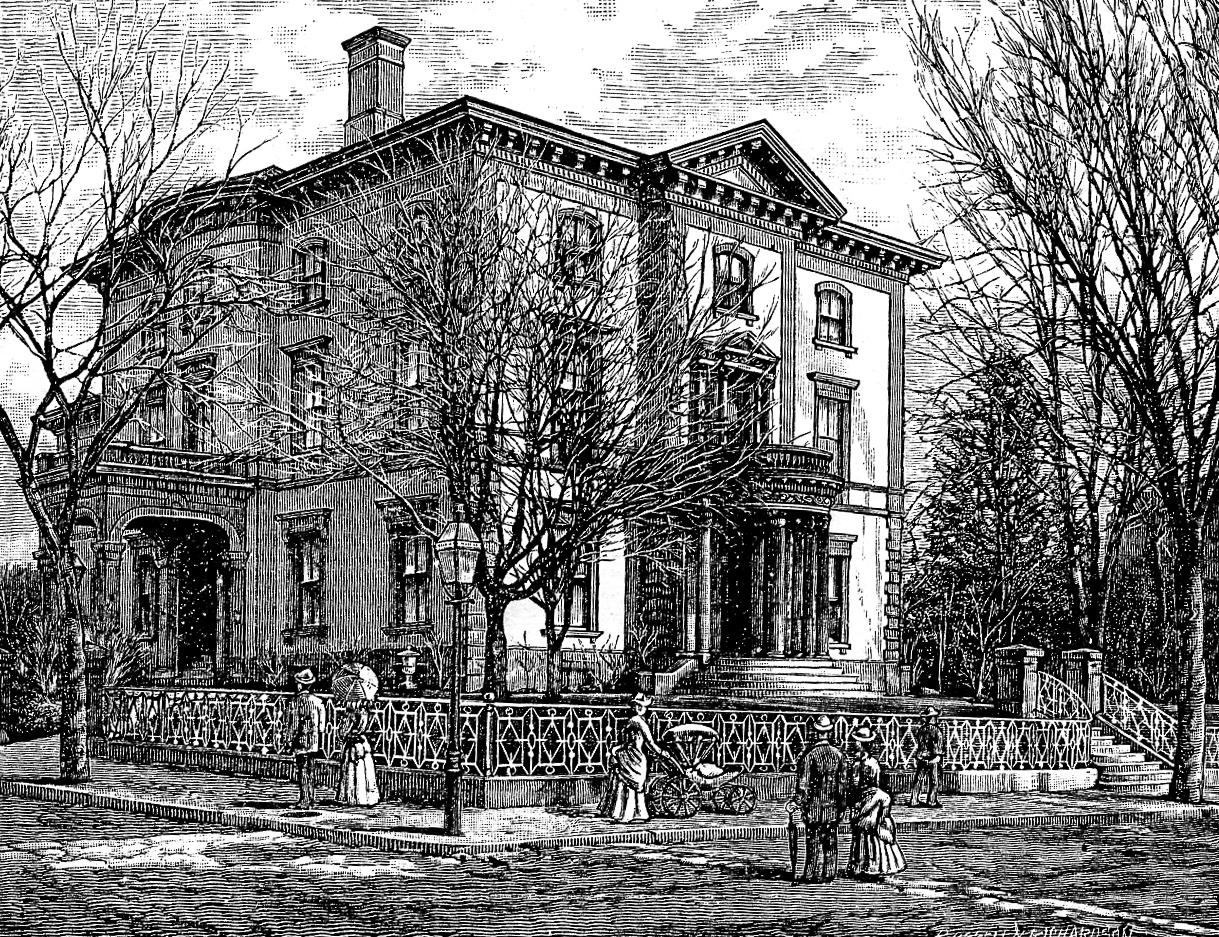
Lippitt House in 1886

The Governor Henry Lippitt House is located on the East Side of Providence. Completed in 1865, it was designated a National Historic Landmark in 1976, and in 1981 was donated by the Lippitt family to Preserve Rhode Island.

Party political offices
Preceded by Henry Howard	Republican nominee for Governor of Rhode Island; 1875, 1876	Succeeded by Charles C. Van Zandt
Political offices
Preceded by Henry Howard	Governor of Rhode Island; 1875–1877	Succeeded by Charles Van Zandt
