= Cyprian Sterry =

American slave trader (c. 1753–1825)

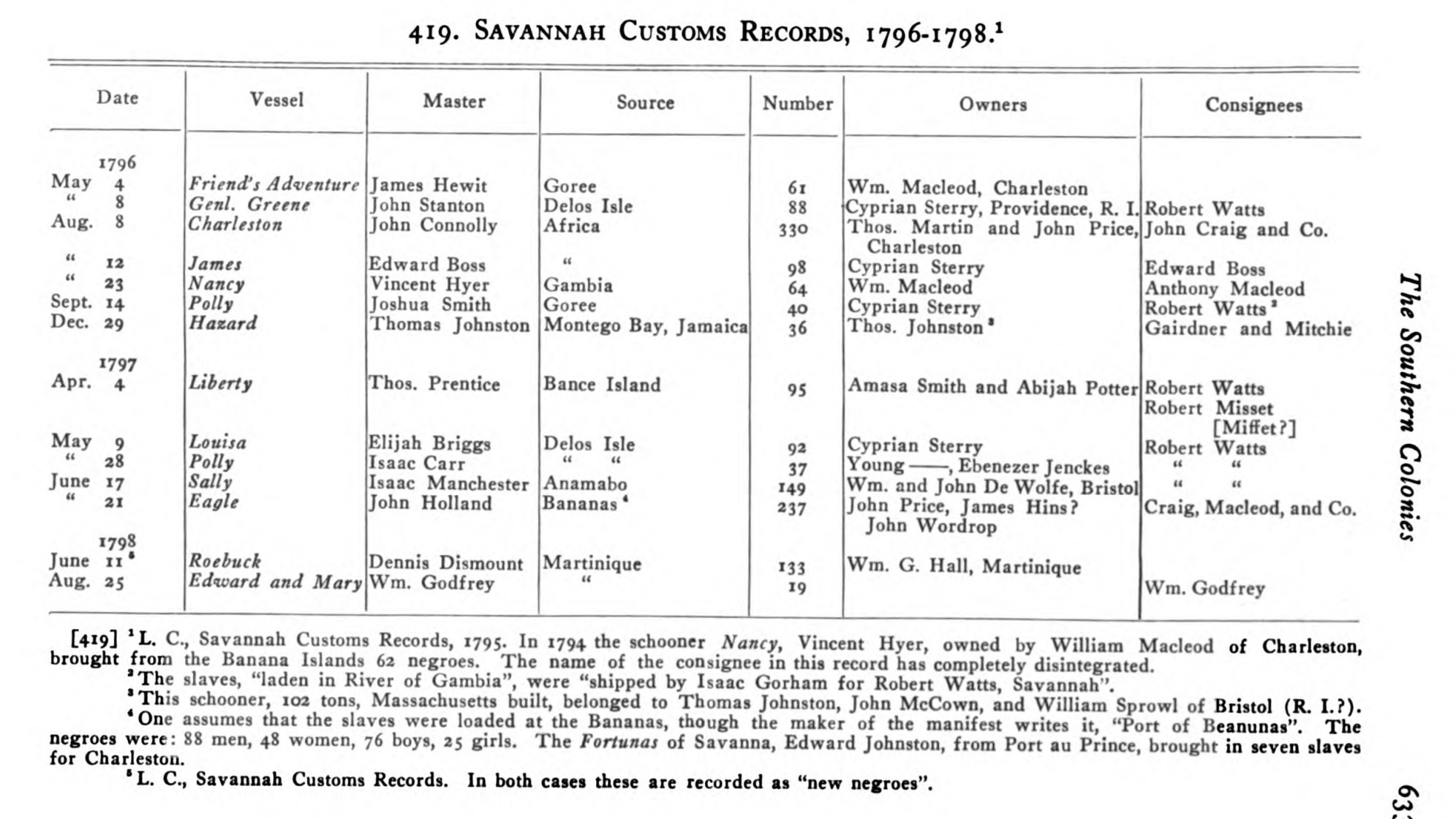
Cyprian Sterry in Elizabeth Donnan's extracts of American slave trade records showing his shipments went to Robert Watts, the "leading slave vendor" in Savannah, Georgia in the 1790s

Cyprian Sterry (c. 1753 – September 1, 1825) was an 18th-century American slave trader. Based in Rhode Island, he has been described as "the main slave trader of Providence" and an "affluent and highly successful merchant-shipowner." Following the end of the American Revolutionary War and the resumption of the transatlantic slave trade by three states, Sterry was a leading trafficker of slaves to the port of Savannah, Georgia. Sterry participated in the triangular trade, bringing rum to the Windward Coast and Gold Coast in exchange for captives that were resold in either Cuba or Georgia. After Rhode Island prohibited slaving in 1797, Sterry was in and out of debtors' prison for a decade before finally declaring bankruptcy in 1807.

== Career ==
Sterry grew up and worked in Rhode Island, a sea-faring colony, "more dependent upon maritime enterprise than any other." It had the highest concentration of slave traders in British North America, as well as a population of abolitionist Quakers. His father was also called Cyprian Sterry and had moved to Providence from Preston, Connecticut, shortly after Cyprian II was born in about 1752.

He served in the American Revolutionary War as a quartermaster and brigade major for the Rhode Island brigade organized in 1776. He was apparently captured while visiting London because he escaped from a British prison in October 1778. In 1779, while living in London, Sterry swore an oath of allegiance to the United States and was issued a passport by Benjamin Franklin so that he could ship Dutch cloth to America, a general business enterprise that was presented to Franklin as serving the patriotic purpose of being a source of blankets for the Continental Army. After returning to America he was again attached to the Army, and again associated with Nathanael Greene. In 1785 he sold an interest in the slave ship Industry, a brigantine, to American Revolutionary War veteran Silas Talbot. He also invested in land in the Northwest Territory and Vermont. According to the Transatlantic Slave Trade Database, Cyprian Sterry was one of the most active slave traders based in Providence, Rhode Island. He financed at least 18 slave-trading trips and trafficked more than 1500 people from Africa to the United States before 1797. His competition included the D'Wolfs of Bristol, Caleb Gardner of Newport, William Vernon of Newport, Peleg Clarke of Newport, Aaron Lopez of Newport, and Samuel Brown. According to historian Peter J. Coleman, "His extensive trading connections had taken his ships to Europe, the Orient, the Guinea coast, and the Caribbean."

The slave trade was banned by the Continental Congress during the American Revolutionary War but resumed afterward in North Carolina, Georgia, and South Carolina. Sterry was the leading vendor of African slave cargoes to Georgia in the 1790s, delivering 13 cargoes "between 1793 and 1796: one each in 1793, 1794, and 1797, five in 1795, and five in 1796. He trafficked a total of 1,238 slaves to Georgia. Presuming his prime was in 1795, his net worth was once estimated at US$235,000 (equivalent to $4,458,088 in 2025). Sterry enslaved four people and had three "free Negroes" working at his house in Providence in 1790, and John Brown got him a seat on the board of Rhode Island College, later Brown University, which position he held from 1792 until 1813. In 1836 Tristam Burges wrote that the family had once lived "in a most opulent condition."

Georgetown University holds a logbook of a slave ship, the Mary, funded by Sterry and captained by one Nathan Sterry, that visited "Senegambia, Windward Coast, and Gold Coast" and sold the approximately 100 slaves that survived the trip to the port of Savannah in 1796 to a "Mr. Robertson of Charleston and a Spanish merchant." In 1795, Sterry and Welcome Arnold had a joint interest in a distillery. Rhode Island prohibited the African slave trade in 1797. Sterry was bullied out of the business by a combination of the law and "the Providence Abolition Society, which threatened to sue him unless he signed a document promising to never engage in the African slave trade again." In June 1798 Sterry made it known that his £15,000 in assets could not cover his $78,000 in debts. Sterry applied for relief from the Rhode Island General Assembly but they apparently were not receptive to his petitions and so he spent a large part of the next decade in and out of debtors' prison as his creditors pressed for repayment. In 1965, historian Coleman wrote of Sterry's indebtedness:

In all Sterry had interests in 15 vessels ranging in size from the 37-ton sloop Polly to the 232-ton ship Mary. With the exception of the 90-ton brigantine Industry, title to which was transferred in 1783, and three vessels which were captured or lost at sea, ownership of all of these vessels passed out of Sterry's hands between 1794 and 1797. Apparently, either he had been trying to raise cash to meet his obligations or he had been making 'wash' sales in an effort to put some of his property out of the reach of his creditors. It may have been allegations that he was pursuing the latter course which made the Assembly reluctant to grant him relief.

Sterry finally had a declaration of bankruptcy approved in 1807. Sterry applied for a Revolutionary War pension in 1820 at which time he declared he had "no property of any description whatever." Cyprian Sterry died in 1825. He is buried in Providence, Rhode Island.

== Robert Sterry ==
Cyprian Sterry's son Robert Sterry, a graduate of Brown University, killed Micajah Green Lewis in a duel in New Orleans in 1805. Robert Sterry was the American consul at La Rochelle, France prior to his death in a shipwreck off Southampton, Long Island in 1820.

== See also ==
- List of Rhode Island slave traders
