= Lippitt, Rhode Island =

Village in Rhode Island, United States

Coordinates: 41°43′17″N 71°31′29″W

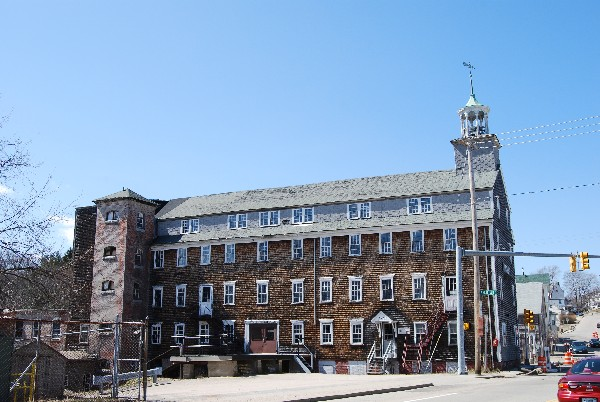
Lippitt Mill, built by Christopher Lippitt in 1809 in West Warwick, Rhode Island

Lippitt, Rhode Island is a village within the town of West Warwick, Rhode Island.

== History ==
Lippitt was founded by Revolutionary War General Christopher Lippitt and his brother Charles Lippitt when they and their partners constructed Lippitt Mill in 1809 and the surrounding mill village for their workers. During the Depression following of War of 1812, the Lippitt Manufacturing Company survived by supplying yarn to convict weavers in the Vermont prison. The original mill and several of the workers row houses still survive. It is one of the oldest cotton mills in New England and has been sold to several owners since the Lippitt family sold it 1889.

The Mill is on the National Register of Historic Places, and is one of the earliest textile mills in Rhode Island. It is one of the oldest American textile mills still used for manufacturing.
