= Westcott, Rhode Island =

Village in Rhode Island, United States

Coordinates: 41°42′53″N 71°29′44″W

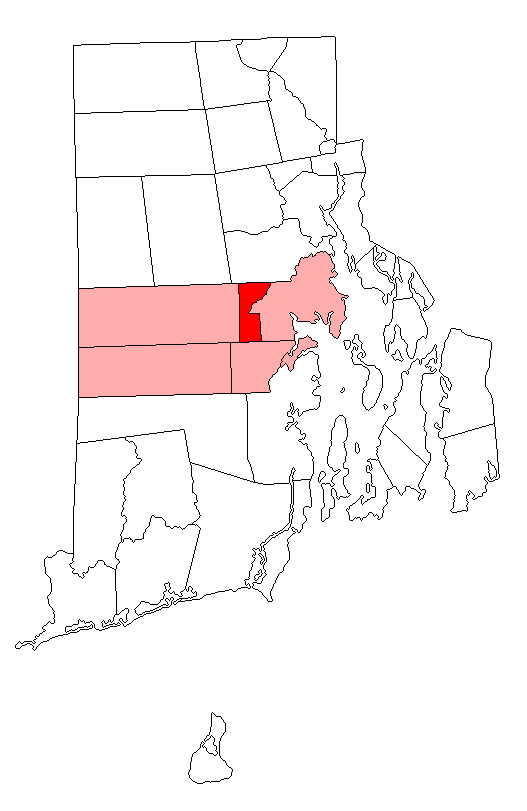
Location of West Warwick in Rhode Island and Kent County

Westcott is a village in the town of West Warwick in Kent County, Rhode Island, United States. It is located between the two Pawtuxet River bridges on Providence Street, at the juncture of New London Avenue, Tollgate Road, and Providence Street in northeastern West Warwick. The community derives its name from the Westcott family who lived on 341 Providence Street.

== History ==
Instead of growing up around a mill like the other villages of West Warwick, Westcott formed around the Westcott homestead and toll house located there to collect the tolls from the New London Turnpike. However, the village remained undeveloped for many years, only being identified as one on an 1895 map. At that point, it was a small hamlet consisting of a store and some houses.

Westcott was home to much of the housing for the workers in the nearby Riverpoint village, such as the twenty duplexes built on Providence Street by the Greene Company. It also was the location of the local schools attended by Riverpoint students, like the elementary school (built in 1925) and the high school (built in 1904).

The New London Turnpike that passed through Westcott was built by the Providence and Pawcatuck Turnpike Company in 1821 to connect the out-of-the-way mills in western Warwick (now West Warwick) to the ports and markets on the Eastern Seaboard like Providence. On top of improving transport between Providence and the Pawtuxet Valley mills, the turnpike also improved long-distance travel between Providence and New London by providing a more direct connection between the two.

However, the road was a financial failure because the tolls made hauling freight too expensive, and the steep hills in the area made travel difficult. By the time the Stonington Railroad was completed in the 1830s, the turnpike had become obsolete.

== Notable Buildings ==
=== Former High School, 319 Providence St. ===
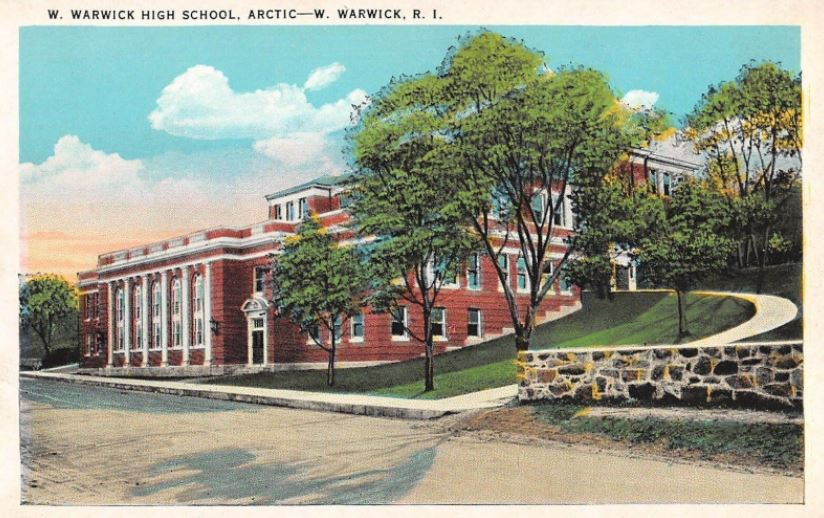
A 1920 postcard by Curt Teich Co. depicting the former West Warwick High School in Westcott.

One of the most significant buildings in Westcott is the former Warwick High School. Built from 1904 to 1905, this Neo-Classical structure served as Warwick's high school until West Warwick split off from Warwick in 1913, where it then became West Warwick's high school. Robert Bryon Treat, a member of the Warwick High School Commission, as well as the owner of the Centerville Mill, played an instrumental part in getting the original Warwick school built.

The iconic "Jerry" statue, a monument to the Union Soldiers of the Civil War from the Pawtuxet Valley and symbol of West Warwick High School was originally dedicated in June 1914 at this high school. The building remained the West Warwick High School until 1965 when the new high school was built on land donated by the Knight family. In 1983 the façade was altered, a new addition was added, and the whole building was converted into Westcott Terrace, an elderly housing project.

=== Westcott-Rice House, 341 Providence St. ===
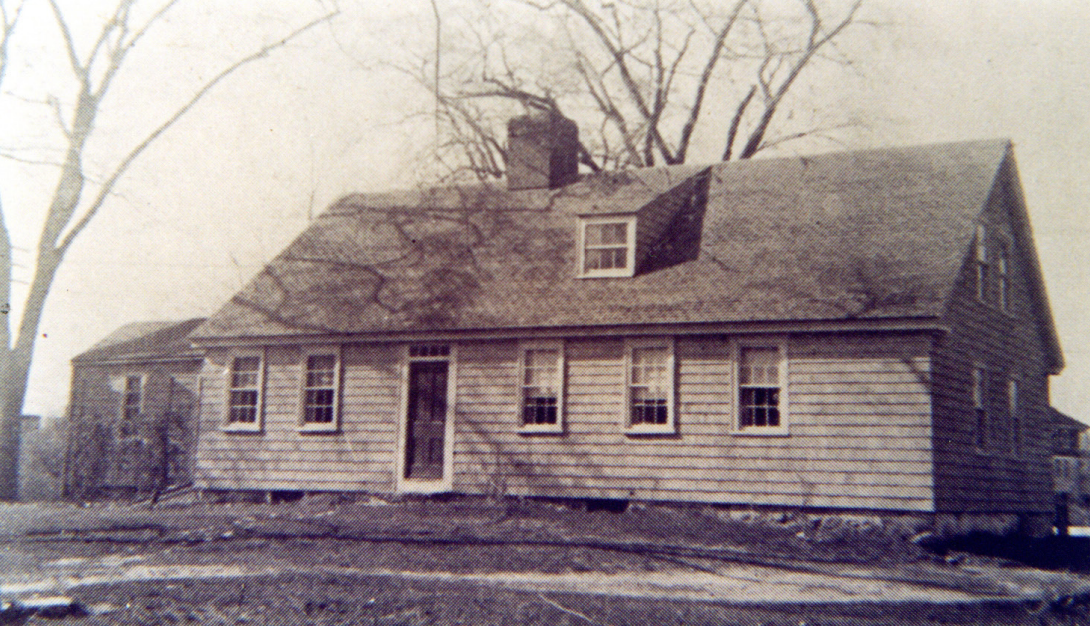
Undated photo of the south side of the Westcott-Rice House.

Built by Anthony Rice, a Revolutionary War soldier, this center-chimney Cape-style house had five rooms on the first floor and two on the second. Anthony's daughter, Sarah Rice, married John Westcott, and the house then remained in the Westcott family until 1922.

In about 1819, when the New London Turnpike was built, a small two-room house was moved from Centerville to serve as a toll house, which was manned by members of the Westcott family.

The original Westcott-Rice House on 341 Providence Street and surrounding 14.62 lot was bought on 08/20/2020 for $600,000. The house no longer stands.
