= Audley Clarke =

Merchant, Slave trader, Banker

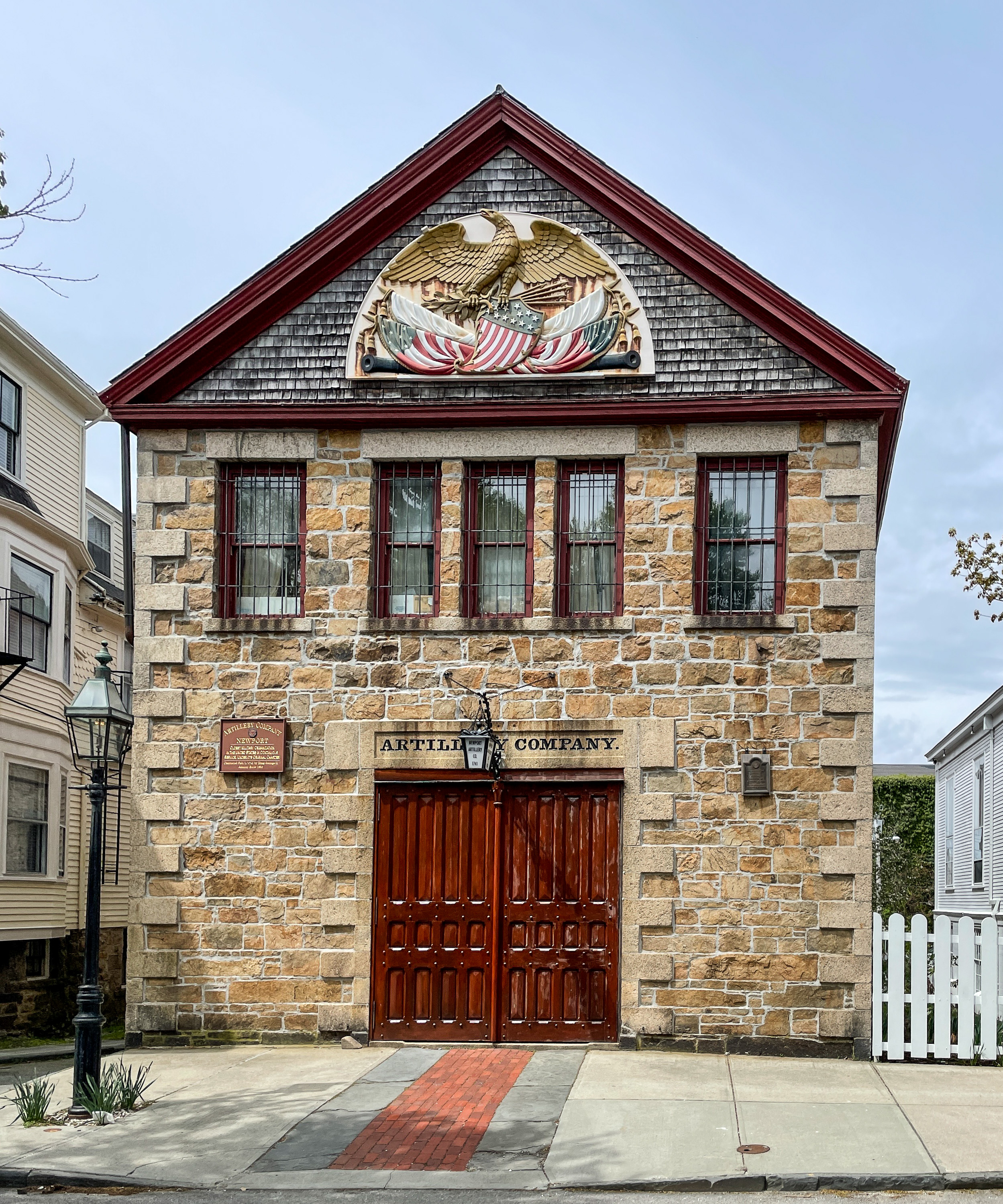
- Audley Clarke donated the land for the Artillery Company of Newport, Rhode Island in 1834.
- Born: June 26, 1770; Newport, Rhode Island
- Died: March 9, 1844 (aged 73)
- Burial place: Common Burying Ground, Newport, Rhode Island
- Occupations: Merchant and slave trader

Audley Clarke (June 26, 1770 – March 9, 1844) was a prominent banker, financier, and merchant from Newport, Rhode Island, known for his extensive involvement in the transatlantic slave trade as well his significant contributions to the local economy. Between 1790 and 1807, Clarke financed multiple slaving voyages yielding high profits and transporting hundreds of enslaved Africans to the Americas. Clarke also played a crucial role in the establishment of the Bank of Rhode Island, where he served as president for nearly three decades, and contributed land for the Newport Artillery Company’s armory. His legacy reflects both his impact on Newport's economic development and his controversial participation in the slave trade.

== Early life and family ==
Audley Clarke, born on June 26, 1770, in Newport, Rhode Island, was the son of Peleg Clarke (1713–1797) and Mary Gardiner. Growing up in Newport, Audley emerged as a prominent merchant and leading citizen of the city.

Before Audley's birth his father Peleg Clarke had played a significant role in Newport's transatlantic slave trade. Acting as both a captain and a ship owner, Peleg conducted at least six voyages between 1773 and 1787, sailing from Rhode Island to the African coast and then to the Americas, where he purchased and transported enslaved Africans. After 1787, he transitioned into solely financing voyages, backing at least seven expeditions until his death in 1796, enslaving over 1,000 Africans in total. These activities established both Peleg and his son Audley as central figures in Newport's slave trade.

On December 8, 1794, Audley Clarke married Mary Gardner, daughter of Caleb Gardner, another prominent Newport slave trader. Gardner, who owned or held shares in more than a dozen slave trade vessels, also captained at least five voyages between 1762 and 1770. Notably, on August 11, 1794, just four months before Audley and Mary's wedding, Peleg Clarke and Caleb Gardner jointly financed a voyage of the slave ship Washington.

== Transatlantic slave trade ==
=== Slave voyages ===
Audley Clarke was deeply enmeshed in the West Indies and transatlantic slave trade during the late 18th and early 19th centuries. His involvement began in 1790, financing at least thirteen voyages to West Africa, facilitating the transportation of enslaved people until the trade's abolition in 1808. Initially partnered with his father, Peleg Clarke, Audley's ventures primarily centered on the snauw Whim, until 1796. However, his ambitions expanded, leading him to establish a profitable partnership with Christopher Fowler in 1805, financing voyages of three vessels: Juliet, Columbia, and Bayard.

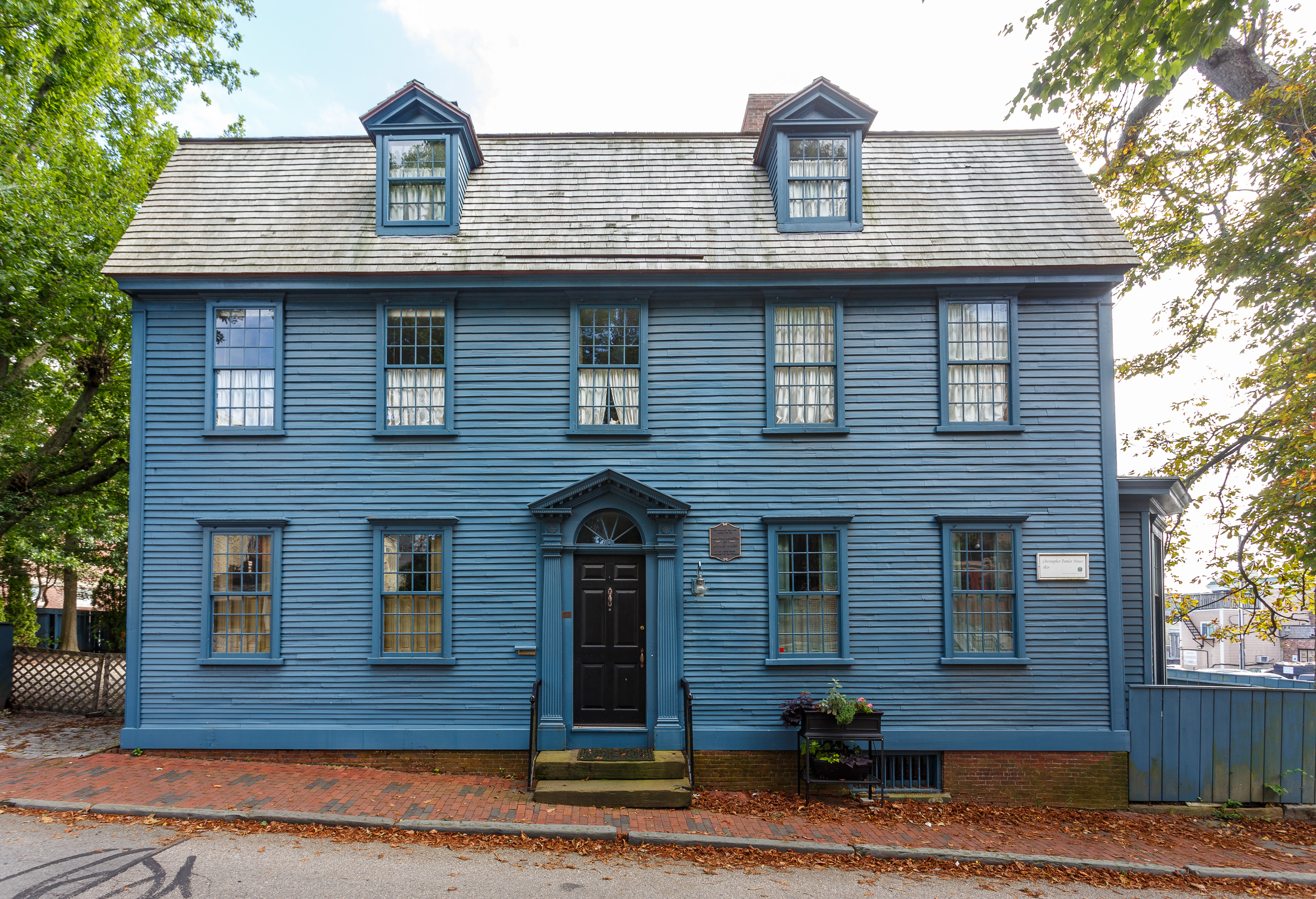
Home of Christopher Fowler, the business partner of Audley Clarke, built in 1801 on Mary Street in Newport, Rhode Island.

This partnership, operating from Howard Wharf off of Thames Street in Newport, extended beyond slave voyages to include rum distillation and the trade of enslaved individuals. Between 1804 and 1807, Audley Clarke and Fowler's partnership was particularly active, funding several slave voyages that transported at least 700 enslaved Africans across the Atlantic. The voyages they financed were marked by the inhumane treatment endured by those forcibly captured and transported. In total, the voyages financed by Audley Clarke resulted in the enslavement of more than 900 Africans.

=== A profitable trade ===
Clarke's financial records provide insights into his ventures in both the West Indian and transatlantic slave trade. Despite turning a small profit in four out of five West Indian voyages, his gains were overshadowed by a disastrous voyage to Havana, resulting in a significant net loss on his Caribbean ventures. However, Clarke's ledger illustrates the stark economic contrast between profits from the slave trade and those from Caribbean voyages. Clarke's slaving voyages yielded substantial profits, averaging around 42 percent, compared to a mere 4 percent from Caribbean ventures. Investments in the slave trade also outstripped those in the West Indian trade, with higher expenditures resulting in exponentially greater profits. These disparities underscored the economic allure of the slave trade, where individuals like Clarke sought the highest returns on their investments. Moreover, the comparison highlights the inherent limitations in estimating the relative value of different branches of commerce solely based on the number of voyages or rates of return. Clarke's records exemplify why merchants with sufficient capital turned to the slave trade for maximum profitability, despite its moral and ethical implications.

=== Deceptive practices ===
Following the Slave Trade Act of 1794, many slave traders resorted to elaborate strategies to evade scrutiny from customs officials and abolitionist groups upon the return of slaving vessels. One such intricate scheme was devised by the firm of Peleg and Audley Clarke, detailed to their captain, John Vilett, in 1796. The scheme involved the use of two distinct sets of ship's papers for the ports of Havana and Savannah, along with a fabricated protest at the former port, facilitating the sale of both ship and cargo. Fictitious bills of sale and lading, alongside a secret code, were employed to further obfuscate the true nature of their activities. Additionally, the plan incorporated maneuvers to expedite the shipment of a significant quantity of specie, disguised as a molasses or sugar cargo. Importantly, the captain and crew of the designated vessel were kept unaware of the deceptive nature of their freight, highlighting the clandestine nature of these operations.

== Later life and investments ==
=== Bank of Rhode Island ===
Audley Clarke's involvement with the Bank of Rhode Island commenced upon its establishment in 1795. The bank, notable for its ties to prominent slave traders, appointed Christopher Champlin as its inaugural president and Moses Seixas as its first cashier. Clarke's association with the bank deepened in the 1810s when he assumed the role of president, a position he held for nearly thirty years until his passing in 1844. His tenure exemplified significant contributions to the local financial sector, while also underscoring the institution's historical links to the transatlantic slave trade. In 1900, the Bank of Rhode Island underwent absorption by the Industrial Trust Company, eventually falling under the ownership of Bank of America.

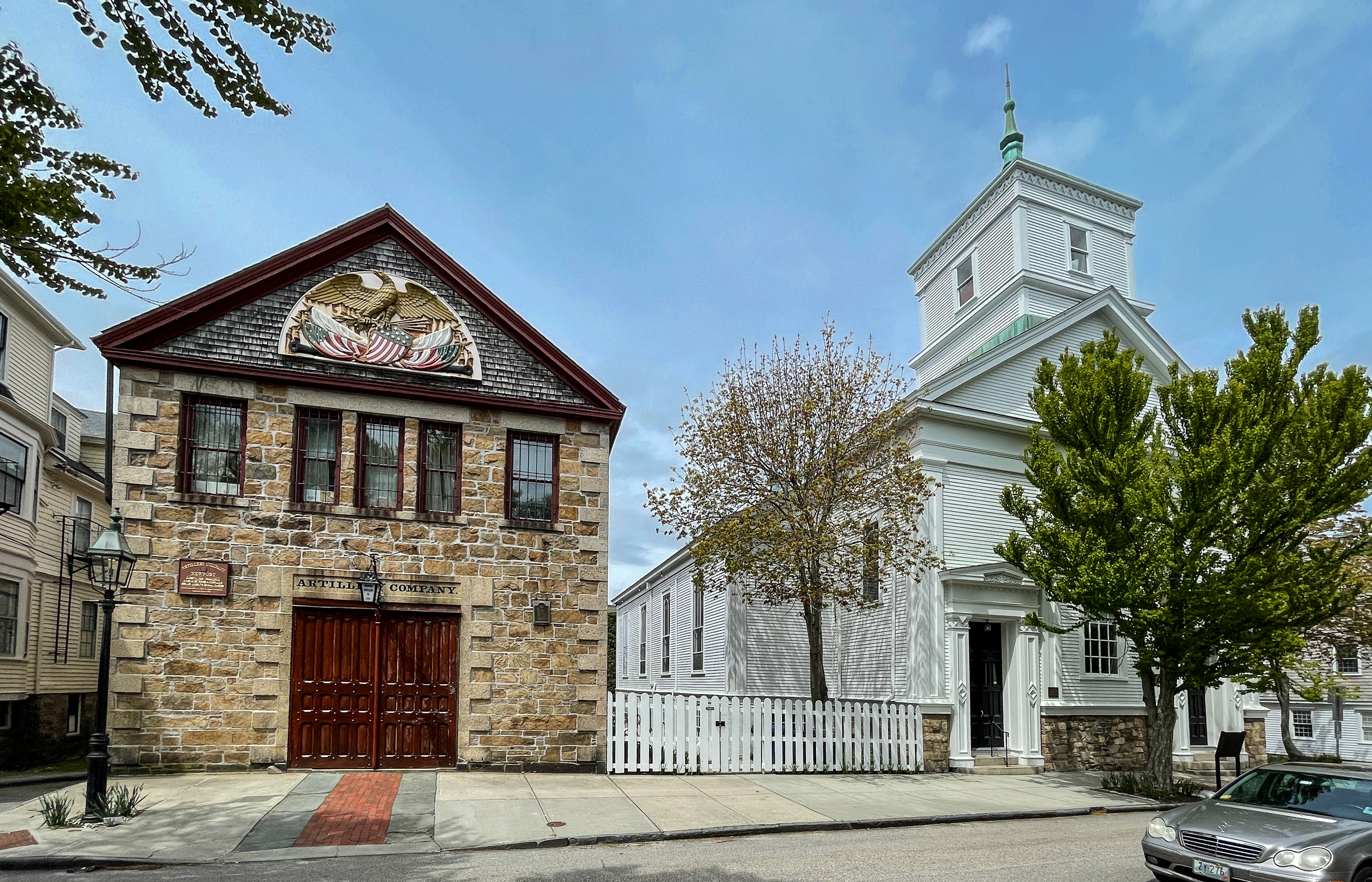
Clarke Street in Newport, named after Audley Clarke, now home to the armory of the Artillery Company of Newport.

=== Artillery Company of Newport ===
Beyond his banking career, Audley Clarke was also a substantial landowner in Newport and Jamestown. In 1834, Clarke, then a member of the company, donated a plot of land to house the unit's armory on Clarke Street in Newport. The armory continues to house the company to this day.

== Death ==
Audley Clarke died on March 9, 1844, in Newport, Rhode Island. He is buried in the Common Burying Ground.
