= Frank Maznicki =

American football player (1920–2013)

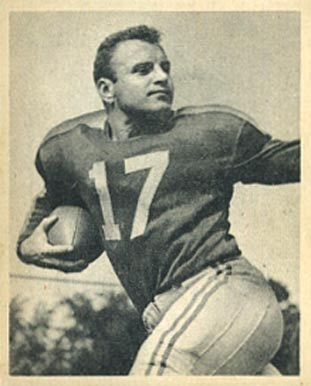
- Maznicki on a 1948 Bowman football card

No. 4, 5, 17
- Position: Halfback

Personal information
- Born: July 19, 1920; West Warwick, Rhode Island, U.S.
- Died: December 14, 2013 (aged 93); West Warwick, Rhode Island, U.S.
- Listed height: 5 ft 9 in (1.75 m)
- Listed weight: 181 lb (82 kg)

Career information
- High school: West Warwick
- College: Boston College (1938-1941)
- NFL draft: 1942: 8th round, 70th overall pick

Career history

Playing
- Chicago Bears (1942, 1946); Boston Yanks (1947)

Coaching
- Deering / West Warwick HS (1947–1983) Head coach

Awards and highlights
- NFL champion (1946); Pro Bowl (1942)

Career NFL statistics
- Rushing yards: 463
- Rushing average: 4.3
- Receptions: 10
- Receiving yards: 131
- Total touchdowns: 4
- Stats at Pro Football Reference

Head coaching record
- Career: 253–79–17 (.749)

Francis Stanley "Monk" Maznicki (July 19, 1920 – December 14, 2013) was an American professional football halfback who played three seasons with the Chicago Bears and Boston Yanks. He played college football at Boston College.

== Early life and college career ==
Maznicki was born on July 19, 1920, in West Warwick, Rhode Island. He played high school football for West Warwick High School's team and quickly became a stand-out football player. He played college football for Boston College and was an All-American running back during his time there. His NFL career was interrupted by World War II and he served as a Navy pilot for three years before he returned to the Chicago Bears.

== Professional career ==
=== Chicago Bears ===
After a standout career at Boston College, Maznicki was drafted by the Chicago Bears in the eighth round of the 1942 NFL draft. Maznicki played halfback, defensive back, and placekicker during his time with the Bears. In 1942, Maznicki made the Pro Bowl with the Bears and helped lead them to an 11–0 record. After he returned from his stint with the Navy, Maznicki returned to the Bears and won the 1946 NFL Championship Game.

=== Boston Yanks ===
In 1947, Maznicki joined the Boston Yanks, and after that season he retired.

== NFL career statistics ==
=== Regular season ===
Season	Games		Rushing				Receiving				Interceptions		Kicking			
Season	GP	GS	Att	Yards	Avg	TD	Rec	Yards	TD	Avg	Int	Yards	FGA	FGM	XPA	XPM
Chicago Bears
1942	11	1	54	343	6.4	1	2	17	1	8.5	4	13	5	4	22	21
1946	4	3	19	43	2.3	0	2	38	0	19.0	2	17	9	4	26	25
Boston Yanks
1947	12	1	34	77	2.3	0	6	76	0	12.7	4	46	2	2	21	19
Career	27	5	107	463	4.3	1	10	131	1	13.1	10	76	16	10	69	65

=== Postseason ===
Season	Games		Rushing				Receiving				Interceptions		Kicking			
Season	GP	GS	Att	Yards	Avg	TD	Rec	Yards	TD	Avg	Int	Yards	FGA	FGM	XPA	XPM
Chicago Bears
1942	1	0	4	11	2.8	0	1	40	0	40.0	0	0	0	0	0	0
1946	1	0	0	0	0.0	0	0	0	0	0.0	0	0	2	1	3	3
Career	2	0	4	11	2.8	0	1	40	0	40.0	0	0	2	1	3	3

== Later life and coaching career ==
After Maznicki retired from the NFL in 1947, he returned to West Warwick and became a long-time coach for the school's football team. He retired in 1984 after finishing his career with an overall record of 253–79–17 alongside fifteen state championships. He died in West Warwick on December 14, 2013, the year West Warwick won the state championship. West Warwick High School's football field is named in honor of Maznicki. He was inducted into the Boston College Varsity Club Hall of Fame in 1971. He was also inducted into the Rhode Island Heritage Hall of Fame in 1974.

== Head coaching record ==
Year	Team	Overall	Conference	Standing	Bowl/playoffs
West Warwick / Deering Wizards () (1947–1983)
1947	West Warwick		5–1		
1948	West Warwick		4–3–1		
1949	West Warwick		7–0–1	1st	
1950	West Warwick		6–0–1	1st	
1951	West Warwick		8–0	1st	
1952	West Warwick		7–0–1	1st	
1953	West Warwick		8–0	1st	
1954	West Warwick		8–0	1st	
1955	West Warwick		6–1–1		
1956	Deering		8–0	1st	
1957	Deering		8–1	T–1st	
1958	Deering		6–3		
1959	Deering		8–1	1st	
1960	Deering		7–1		
1961	Deering		6–1		
1962	Deering		6–1	T–1st	
1963	Deering		4–1–1		
1964	Deering		2–4		
1965	West Warwick		2–5		
1966	West Warwick		3–4		
1967	West Warwick		3–4		
1968	West Warwick		8–1	T–1st	
1969	West Warwick		9–0	T–1st	
1970	West Warwick		6–3		
1971	West Warwick		9–0	T–1st	
1972	West Warwick		5–2		
1973	West Warwick		4–3		
1974	West Warwick		3–6		
1975	West Warwick		3–5–1		
1976	West Warwick		5–2		
1977	West Warwick		6–0–1	1st	
1978	West Warwick		7–1		
1979	West Warwick		7–1		
1980	West Warwick		7–2		
1981	West Warwick		6–3		
1982	West Warwick		7–1–1		
1983	West Warwick	10–0–1	9–0	1st	
West Warwick / Deering:		253–79–17	223–62–9		
Total:		253–79–17			
National championship Conference title Conference division title or championship game berth
