= Babcock's/Lippitt's Regiment =

Babcock's Regiment Lippitt's Regiment
- Active: 1776-1777
- Disbanded: January 18, 1777
- Countries: United States
- Allegiance: Rhode Island
- Type: Infantry
- Engagements: Battle of Trenton; Battle of Princeton

Commanders
- Notable commanders: Colonel Henry Babcock; Colonel Christopher Lippitt

Babcock's/Lippitt's Regiment was a regiment raised for the defense of Rhode Island during the American Revolution.

== History ==
The regiment was one of two formed by the state of Rhode Island between November 1775 and January 1776 to deter an attack by the British against Rhode Island.

The regiment was authorized by the Rhode Island General Assembly on January 8, 1776, in the Rhode Island State Troops as Babcock's Regiment. It was organized on January 18, 1776, with 12 companies under the command of Colonel Henry Babcock (1736–1800). Colonel Babcock was the son of Major General Joshua Babcock (1707–1783) who commanded the Rhode Island Militia from October 1775 to December 1776.

The regiment was originally located on Aquidneck Island, along with Richmond's Regiment. Together, the two regiments formed a brigade under the command of Colonel Babcock.

In May 1776 Colonel Babcock was relieved of command for "being at times deprived of perfect use of his reason" and Lieutenant Colonel Christopher Lippitt replaced him as the regimental commander and was promoted to colonel. Hereafter, the regiment was known as "Lippitt's Regiment".

On May 11, 1776, the regiment was adopted into the Continental Army and assigned to the Eastern Department. Relieved on September 14, 1776, from the Eastern Department, it was assigned to the Main Continental Army.

The regiment was ordered to New York in September 1776 where it became part of Nixon's Brigade, along with two other Rhode Island regiments. This was shortly after the British occupation of New York City and Manhattan Island.

Assigned on October 14, 1776 to McDougall's Brigade, it became part of the Main Army. In October the regiment was at the Battle of White Plains.

Relieved on November 10, 1776 from McDougall's Brigade, it was then assigned to Nixon's Brigade. Nixon's Brigade was re-designated on 22 December 22, 1776 as Hitchcock's Brigade.

Although the regiment was enlisted for one year, the soldiers of the regiment volunteered to stay with the Army for four more weeks. This allowed the regiment to participate in the Second Battle of Trenton and the Battle of Princeton. The regiment was disbanded on January 18, 1777, at Morristown, New Jersey.

== Successor units ==
When Lippitt's and Richmond's regiments were disbanded the State of Rhode Island recognized the need to have a full-time military force within the state to deter aggression by the British who were occupying Aquidneck Island. As a result, the state established a brigade of two regiments of infantry and one of artillery which were known as Rhode Island State Troops to distinguish them from the militia which would be called into service only in an emergency. The State Troops served one year enlistments and served until sometime after the British surrender at Yorktown in October 1781.

The first contingent of State Troops was organized in December 1776 and enlisted for 15 months. The two regiments of infantry, of 750 men each, were commanded by Colonel Joseph Stanton, Jr. and Colonel John Cook, respectively. The artillery regiment, of 300 men, was commanded by Colonel Robert Elliott. The three regiments formed a brigade under the command of Colonel James Varnum who was on furlough from the Continental Army. Varnum's command of the brigade was short lived as he was promoted to Brigadier General in the Continental Army on February 27, 1777. He was succeeded by Colonel Ezekiel Cornell who was promoted to Brigadier General in December 1777. In June 1777 Colonel Archibald Crary succeeded Colonel Cook in command of one of the infantry regiments. In November 1777 Colonel Stanton resigned and Colonel William Barton succeeded him. In February 1778 Colonel John Topham succeeded Colonel Barton, who had accepted a commission in the Continental Army, in command of the other regiment.

The regiments were reenlisted for another 15 months in March 1778. When their term of service expired in June 1779, the Rhode Island General Assembly decided to retain only one regiment of 630 men under the command of Colonel Topham. This regiment was augmented by a Corps of Light Infantry of about 270 men organized into four companies commanded by Colonel Barton. The Corps of Light Infantry was disbanded in February 1780 with its soldiers being reassigned to either Topham's regiment of infantry or Elliot's regiment of artillery. In July 1780, Topham's regiment was re-enlisted for three months but was, apparently, disbanded in October 1780 as it does not appear in the state's records after that date.

== Notable members ==
Lieutenant William Jones was a member of the regiment who later became a captain in the United States Marine Corps and served as Governor of Rhode Island from 1811 to 1817.

Captain Arthur Fenner served as Governor of Rhode Island from 1790 to 1805.

Captain Simeon Martin later served as Lieutenant Governor of Rhode Island.

Quartermaster Benjamin Bourne was elected as a United States representative and served as a federal judge on the Eastern Circuit.

== Senior officers ==
- Colonel Henry Babcock, January 18, 1776, to May 1776
- Colonel Christopher Lippitt, May 1776 to January 18, 1777
- Lieutenant Colonel Adam Comstock
- Major James Tew, Jr.

== See also ==
- 1st Rhode Island Regiment
- 2nd Rhode Island Regiment
- Sherburne's Additional Continental Regiment
- Richmond's Regiment
