= List of Rhode Island slave traders =

This is a list of slave traders based out of the U.S. state of Rhode Island, who typically ran slave ships between the coast of Africa, the Caribbean islands, and the Southern United States, predominantly before 1797–98.

- Shearjashub Bourne
- Nathaniel Briggs and Thomas Briggs
- Brown brothers including John Brown and Samuel Brown
- Champlins
- Audley Clarke
- Peleg Clarke, Newport
- The D'Wolf brothers, Bristol
- Caleb Gardner, Newport
- Gardner & Dean
- George Gibbs
- Jeremiah Ingraham
- Ebenezer Jenckes
- Aaron Lopez, Newport
- Samuel Packard
- Abijah Potter
- Jacob Rodriguez Rivera
- Amasa Smith
- Cyprian Sterry and Nathan Sterry, Providence
- Constant Taber
- John Topham
- William Vernon, Newport

== See also ==
- List of slave traders of the United States
  - List of Alabama slave traders
  - List of District of Columbia slave traders
  - List of Georgia and Florida slave traders
  - List of Kentucky slave traders
  - List of Maryland and Delaware slave traders
  - List of Missouri slave traders
  - List of Texas slave traders

== Sources ==
- Rothman, Adam (2005). Slave Country: American Expansion and the Origins of the Deep South. Harvard University Press. doi:10.4159/9780674042919. ISBN 978-0-674-04291-9. LCCN 2004057658. OCLC 56191767.
