= Richmond's Regiment =

- Active: 1775-1777
- Country: United States
- Allegiance: Rhode Island
- Type: Infantry
- Part of: Eastern Department, Continental Army

Commanders
- Notable commanders: Colonel William Richmond; Lt. Col. Caleb Gardner

Richmond's Regiment was a regiment formed by the state of Rhode Island in November 1775, during the American Revolution for the defense of the state against an attack by the British.

== History ==
The regiment was authorized by the Rhode Island General Assembly on October 31, 1775. It was organized in November with eight companies commanded by Colonel William Richmond and was named "Richmond's Regiment".

On December 22, the regiment was stationed on Aquidneck Island to deter a possible invasion of the vital port city of Newport by the British Army. It was engaged in constructing fortifications to defend the city. The regiment originally had eight companies but was expanded to twelve on January 8, 1776.

In April 1776 soldiers of the regiment constructed an earthwork battery on Brenton's Point (today the location of Fort Adams) and fired on British warships which were blockading Newport harbor on four occasions between April 6 and 14.

In May 1776 the regiment was taken into Continental Service. The regiment was ordered by General Washington to Long Island in September of the same year.

As of October 28, 1776, the regiment was in Mastic, New York on Long Island when it assisted William Floyd, delegate to the Continental Congress and signer of the Declaration of Independence, and his family, to flee from Long Island to Connecticut.

In concert with New York Continentals led by Lieutenant Colonel Henry B. Livingston, Richmond's Regiment conducted an amphibious landing at Brookhaven and captured 23 of Oliver DeLancy's Loyalist Brigade and their commanding officer, Captain Jacob Smith. The Loyalists lost six killed and an unknown number of wounded. Richmond's Regiment lost one killed, and had five wounded.

The eight original companies of the regiment were discharged at New London, Connecticut upon their return from Long Island on November 6. The regiment's artillery company was discharged on December 1.

The four remaining companies were sent to bolster Colonel John Cooke's Rhode Island militia forces then assembled at Newport. In December 1776 Newport was invaded by large force of British and Hessians and the few defenders there withdrew to the mainland.

The four remaining companies of Richmond's Regiment were discharged when their enlistments expired in January 1777.

== Senior officers ==
- Colonel William Richmond, October 1775 to c. December 1776
- Lieutenant Colonel Gideon Hoxie October 1775 to c. August 1776
- Lieutenant Colonel Caleb Gardner 19 August 1776 to c. December 1776
- Major Benjamin Tallman, 1 November 1775 to 25 January 1776
- Major Caleb Gardner, 25 January 1776 to 19 August 1776

== See also ==
- 1st Rhode Island Regiment
- 2nd Rhode Island Regiment
- Sherburne's Additional Continental Regiment
- Babcock's/Lippitt's Regiment
