= Jim Mello =

American football player (1920–2006)

No. 66, 78, 65, 38, 5
- Positions: Fullback, linebacker, defensive back

Personal information
- Born: November 8, 1920; River Point, Rhode Island, U.S.
- Died: May 27, 2006 (aged 85); Mesa, Arizona, U.S.
- Listed height: 5 ft 10 in (1.78 m)
- Listed weight: 190 lb (86 kg)

Career information
- High school: West Warwick (RI)
- College: Notre Dame (1941-1943, 1946)
- NFL draft: 1945: 6th round, 47th overall pick

Career history
- Boston Yanks (1947); Los Angeles Rams (1948); Chicago Rockets/Hornets (1948-1949); Detroit Lions (1949); Paterson Panthers (1950)

Awards and highlights
- 2× National champion (1943, 1946); West Warwick High School Athletic Hall of Fame; College All-Star Team (1947)

Career NFL/AAFC statistics
- Rushing yards: 308
- Rushing average: 3.4
- Receptions: 6
- Receiving yards: 81
- Total touchdowns: 1
- Stats at Pro Football Reference

James Anthony Mello (November 8, 1920 – May 27, 2006) was an American football player. He won two national championships at the University of Notre Dame and went on to play professionally between 1947 and 1950 as a member of the Boston Yanks, Chicago Rockets, Los Angeles Rams, Detroit Lions, and Paterson Panthers.

== Early life ==
Jim Mello was born on November 8, 1920, in River Point, Rhode Island, one of thirteen children born to Portuguese immigrants Frank and Anna Mello. He graduated from West Warwick High School in Rhode Island and also attended LaSalle Military Academy.

As a student at West Warwick High School, Mello was a three-sport athlete, winning three varsity letters in football, three in baseball, and two in basketball. In 1938, he was named to the Rhode Island All-State Baseball Team, and in 1939, he was named All-State for football.

== College career ==
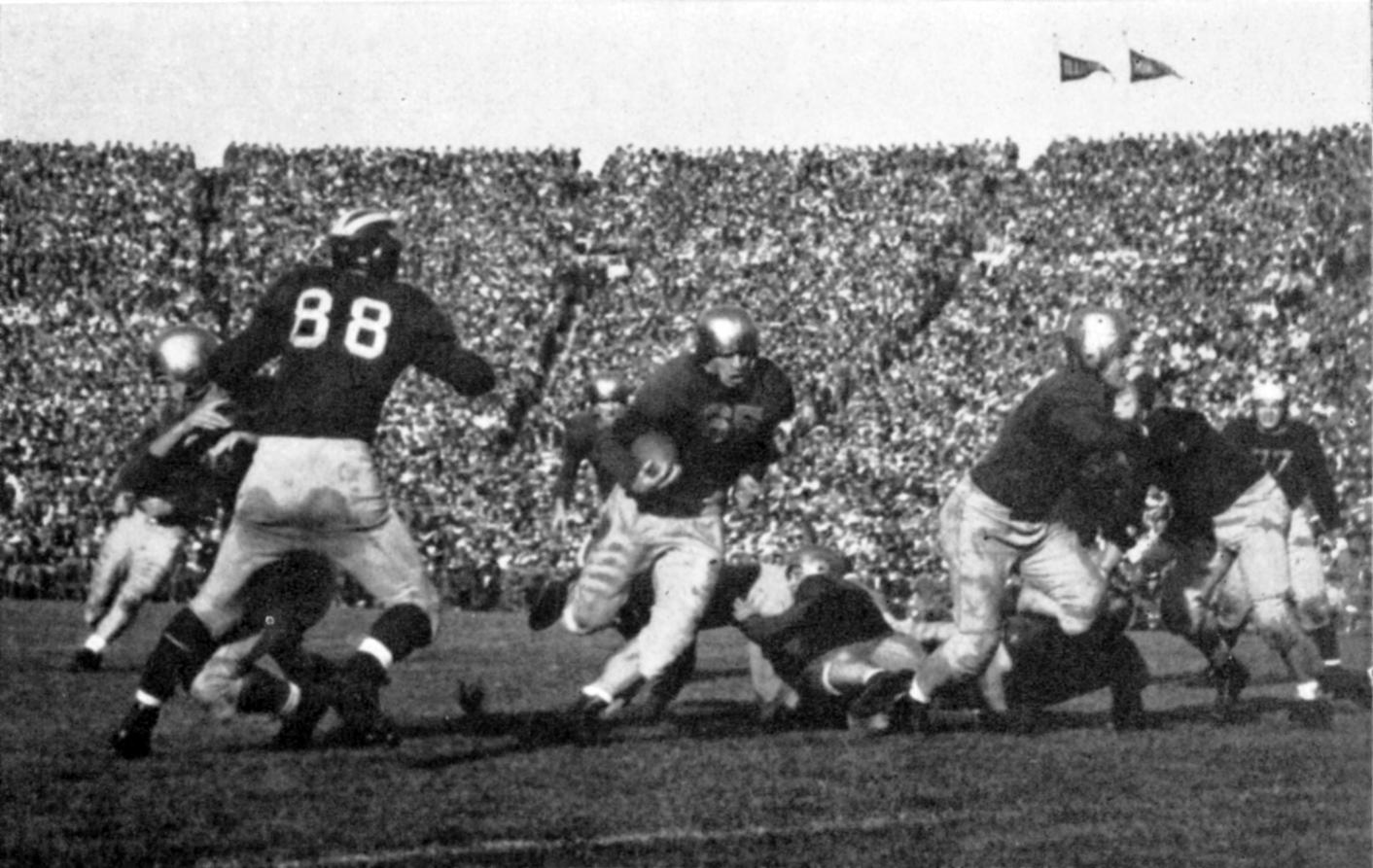
Jim Mello (center) in action against Michigan during the 1943 season

=== Notre Dame (1941–1943) ===
Mello attended college at the University of Notre Dame. He did not see any action on the gridiron in 1941 under first-year coach Frank Leahy. The 1942 season saw Mello splitting time at the fullback position with teammates Corwin Clatt and Gerry Cowhig. Mello finished the season with one touchdown and won his first monogram at Notre Dame. The 1943 season was Mello's breakout season at Notre Dame. In the absence of Clatt and Cowhig, who had been drafted into the armed forces, Mello became the starting fullback for the Irish. By the season's end, he had scored five touchdowns and rushed for 714 yards on 137 carries, training only Creighton Miller in total yards and carries. At the end of the season, the Associated Press named Notre Dame national champions, the first of two national titles Mello would help the Irish win.

=== Service in the United States Navy (1944–1945) ===
As the Second World War raged, Mello served in the United States Navy from 1944 to 1945. While in the Navy, Mello spent the 1944 season playing for "the Lakes" of Great Lakes Naval Training Station, the same team that had handed Notre Dame its only loss during its championship run the year before. Coached by Paul Brown, the 1944 Great Lakes team, compiled a 9-2-1 record and Mello was considered to be "the offensive mainstay" of the team. Back at Notre Dame, Mello's old jersey number (#65) was given to John Panelli, who shared his striking resemblance to Mello. According to a student reporter, Panelli "could pass as Mello's brother, often creating confusion on the practice field." Panelli and Mello would later play together as members of the Detroit Lions during the 1949 season.

In 1945, Mello was drafted by the Boston Yanks in the 6th round (47th overall) of the 1945 NFL draft.

=== Return to Notre Dame (1946) ===
After the end of World War II, Mello returned to Notre Dame after more than two years away. Now almost 26 years old, married, and the father of a young son, Mello returned to a team with significant depth in the backfield. Even still, Mello was able to reclaim his job as starting fullback for the Irish, something that he told the student newspaper was one of his "biggest personal thrills." Respected as a leader and a reliable ball-carrier, Mello was named team captain for the Irish's 49-6 route against Purdue on October 12, 1945. At the season's end, Mello was Notre Dame's top scorer - with 6 touchdowns and 307 rushing yards on 61 carries - and the Associated Press again named the undefeated Notre Dame squad national champions. In a fitting conclusion to his notable college career, Mello was selected to be the starting fullback for the 1947 College All-Stars Team and scored the opening touchdown in a 16–0 victory over the Chicago Bears in the 1947 edition of the College All-Star Football Classic.

== Professional career ==
After graduating from Notre Dame, Mello played for the Boston Yanks, who had previously drafted him, in 1947. He appeared in nine games in his first year, starting four. He recorded 33 rush attempts for 62 yards. On receptions, Mello gained 26 yards.

He played for two teams in 1948: the Chicago Rockets of the All-America Football Conference (AAFC) and the Los Angeles Rams of the National Football League (NFL). With the Rams, he appeared in three games, and with the Rockets, six. He finished the season with 57 rush attempts for 246 yards. He also contributed 4 receptions for 55 yards.

He played for the Rockets again in 1949, playing one game before joining the Detroit Lions. With the Lions, he appeared in ten games. He was a two-way player at the time, making three interceptions for 61 yards on defense. He also had 3 fumble returns for 25 yards.

In 1950, Mello played five games in the AFL with the Paterson Panthers. They folded after the season, ending his professional career.

== Personal life ==
Jim Mello married his wife, Winifred Jacqueline "Jacquie" Mello, in 1944, while he was a student at Notre Dame. They were married for 59 years and together had four children, four grandchildren, and six great-grandchildren.

After retiring from professional football, Mello served as Director of Physical Education at the Mansfield Training School for Special Needs Children. He was also a prominent figure in the early days of the Special Olympics and was a long-time organizer of the Connecticut Special Olympics.

Upon his retirement in 1986, Jim and Jacquie moved to Mesa, Arizona, where Mello lived until his death on May 27, 2006, at the age of 85. He is buried in St. Joseph's Cemetery in South Bend, Indiana.
