= Christopher Lippitt =

American Army officer and businessman (1744–1824)

- Born: October 28, 1744; Cranston, Rhode Island
- Died: June 17, 1824 (aged 79)
- Known for: American Revolutionary officer; founded Lippitt Mill
- Spouse: Waite Harris

Christopher Lippitt (October 28, 1744 – June 17, 1824) was an American Revolutionary War officer and founder one of the earliest textile mills in Rhode Island.

== Early life ==
Lippitt was the fourth child of Christopher Lippitt (1712–1764) and Catherine (Holden) Lippitt and the oldest surviving son at the time of his father's death in 1764. Since 1715 the Lippitt family had owned Lippitt Hill in the Hope neighborhood in the southwestern part of Cranston, Rhode Island. Lippitt was first elected to General Assembly at age 21 and continued serving until Revolution. At age 22 made captain of militia and Justice of the Peace. Lippitt owned a sawmill and a farm and was recorded as having six slaves in the 1774 census and two slaves in 1790 census.

== Service in Revolution ==
During the American Revolution in January 1776, Lippitt was chosen Lieutenant Colonel of Babcock's/Lippitt's Regiment, which defended the mainland of Rhode Island from a possible British invasion. The regiment's first commander, Colonel Henry Babcock, was dismissed for incompetency in May and Lippitt succeeded to command and was promoted to colonel.

In 1776, his regiment joined the Continental Army on George Washington's orders and went to Harlem Heights, New York and served at the Battle of Long Island. Lippitt's regiment was also at the Battle of Princeton, Battle of White Plains and Battle of Trenton. He spent the winter at Morristown, New Jersey and returned to Rhode Island in the spring when the regiment's enlistment expired.

Upon returning to Rhode Island, Lippitt was promoted to the rank of brigadier general of Rhode Island militia in July 1780, and commanded the Providence County brigade of militia when the French troops occupied Newport from 1780 to 1781. He served in this position until June 1787 when he was succeeded by Brigadier General Simeon Thayer.

== After the Revolution ==
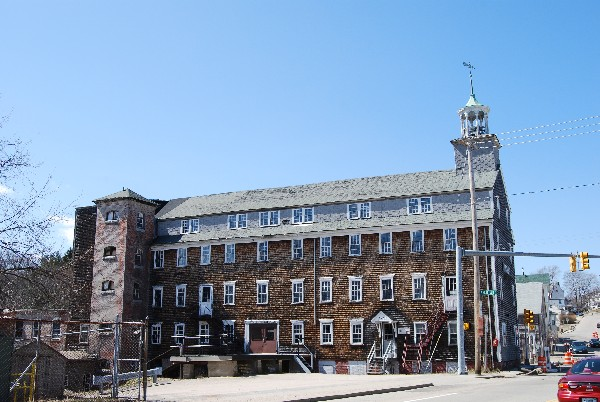
Lippitt Mill, built by Christopher Lippitt in 1809 in West Warwick, Rhode Island

After the Revolution Christopher Lippitt returned to farming for a period and was elected to the Rhode Island General Assembly and was appointed justice of the Rhode Island Supreme Court in 1783. In 1788, Lippitt was dismissed from political office by voters for supporting adoption of the U.S. Constitution which was unpopular in Rhode Island at the time.

Christopher Lippitt was an active Christian and was a member of the local Methodist congregation. Lippit was raised by his mother as an Episcopalian. He was introduced to the Methodists by his brother Charles, while serving in New York during the Revolutionary War. In 1791 Christopher Lippitt invited Jesse Lee, a prominent Methodist evangelist, to preach and teach a class at his house. Lippitt's wife and daughter became Methodists at this time. In 1800 Lippitt built a small meeting house on his farm to serve as a Methodist chapel. Prior to this he had offered his home for use by itinerant Methodist preachers. Later in life Lippitt joined the Peace Society.

In 1805, Lippitt built the house still known today as Lippitt Hill Farm in Cranston.

In 1809, Christopher and his younger brother, Charles Lippitt, along with Benjamin Aborn, George Jackson, Amasa Mason, and William Mason organized a cotton mill under the name the Lippitt Manufacturing Company. The company grew throughout the 19th century becoming a large profitable enterprise in which several generations of the family were involved. The original Lippitt Mill building operated as a textile mill for 200 years, finally closing in 2010, and still stands in Lippitt Village in what is now the town of West Warwick.

== Family ==
Christopher married Waity (or Waite) Harris (1755–1836) in 1777, and had twelve children, five of whom died in infancy and another in early childhood:

- 1. Susanna (1778–1818)
- 2. son (1779-1779)
- 3. son (1781-1781)
- 4. son (1782-1782)
- 5. Christopher Jr. (1783- )
- 6. Waity (1784- )
- 7. daughter (1785-1785)
- 8. William (1786–1872)
- 9. Joseph (1790- ), settled in Ohio.
- 10. son (1793-1793)
- 11. Mary (1795-1881 )
- 12. Benjamin (1797–1803)

== Notable Lippitt family members ==
- Charles W. Lippitt, Governor of Rhode Island
- Henry Lippitt, Governor of Rhode Island
- Henry F. Lippitt, U.S. senator
- Frederick Lippitt, State Representative and philanthropist
- John Chafee, U.S. senator and Governor of Rhode Island
- Lincoln Chafee, U.S. senator and Governor of Rhode Island
