= Lippitt Mill =

- U.S. National Register of Historic Places
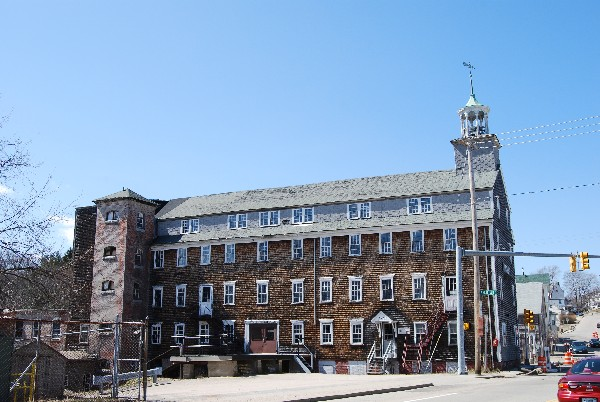

- Location within Rhode Island Location within the United States
- Location: West Warwick, Rhode Island
- Coordinates: 41°43′12″N 71°31′38″W
- Built: 1809
- NRHP reference No.: 74000053
- Added to NRHP: January 11, 1974

The Lippitt Mill is a historic mill at 825 Main Street in West Warwick, Rhode Island.

== History ==
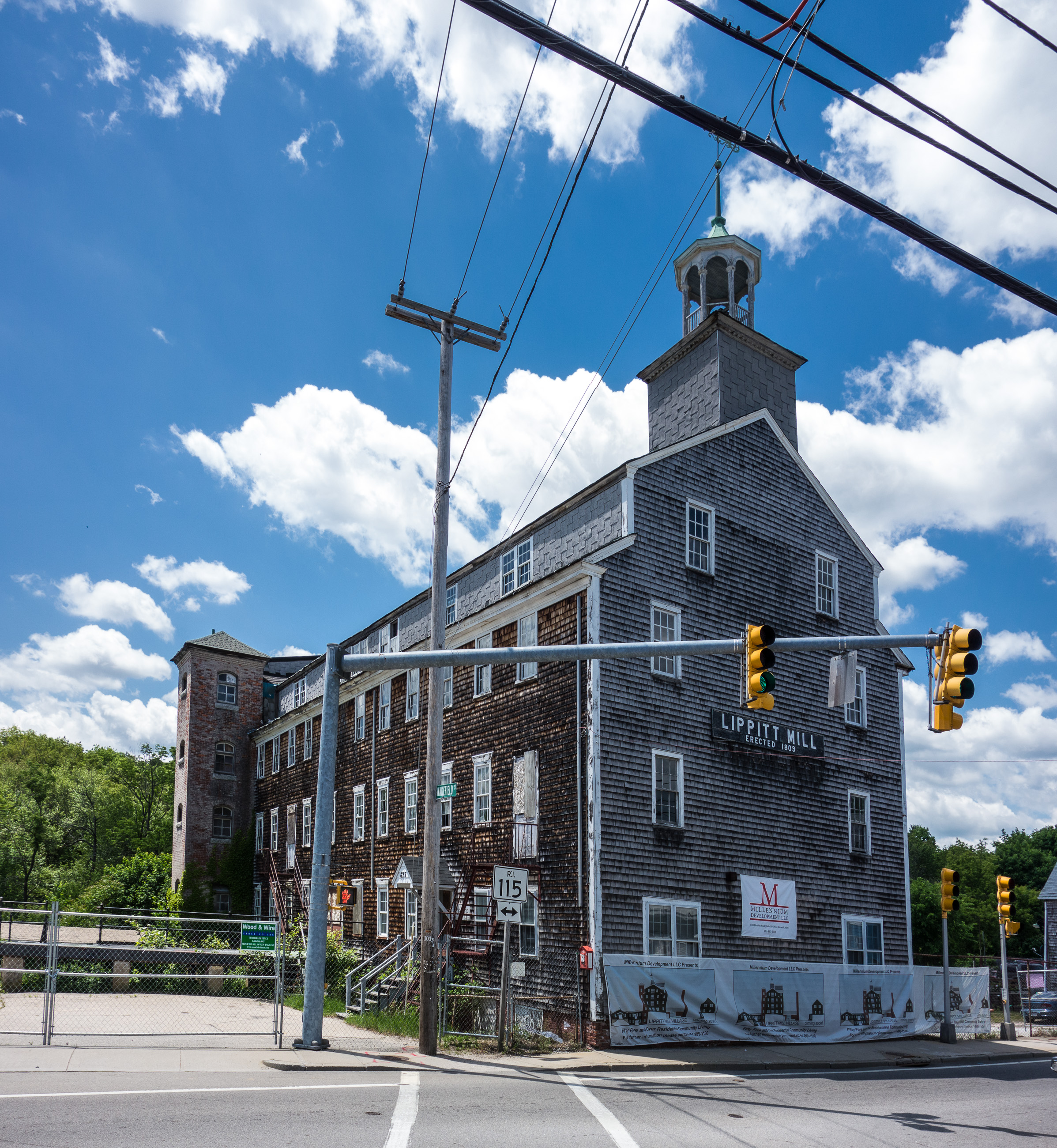
Lippitt Mill undergoing renovations in 2014

The cotton textile mill was built in 1809, making it the third oldest in Rhode Island after John Slater's Mills in Slatersville and Samuel Slater Slater Mill. The Lippitt Manufacturing Company was founded by Revolutionary War officer, Christopher Lippitt, his brother Charles Lippitt, and Benjamin Aborn, George Jackson, Amasa Mason, and William Mason. During the Depression following of the War of 1812 the Lippitt Manufacturing Company survived by supplying yarn to convict weavers in the Vermont prison. The company grew throughout the 19th century becoming a large profitable enterprise in which several generations of the Lippitt family were involved. In 1889, all of the Lippitt Company assets were sold to the firm of B.B. Knight & Robert Knight, founders of Fruit of the Loom. In 1925, B.B. Knight sold the Lippitt Mill property to Joseph Hayes, owner of the Riverpoint Lace Works. The building was added to the National Register of Historic Places in 1973. The Hayes family stopped manufacturing lace here in the early 1970s, but they retained ownership of the property until it went into receivership in 2008. The mill continued operation until 2010, a bad economy forced the mill to close.

A plan was announced in 2014 to convert the property to residences for people over 55.

The mill is on the National Register of Historic Places, and is one of the earliest textile mills in Rhode Island.

== See also ==
- National Register of Historic Places listings in Kent County, Rhode Island
