= Henry Babcock =

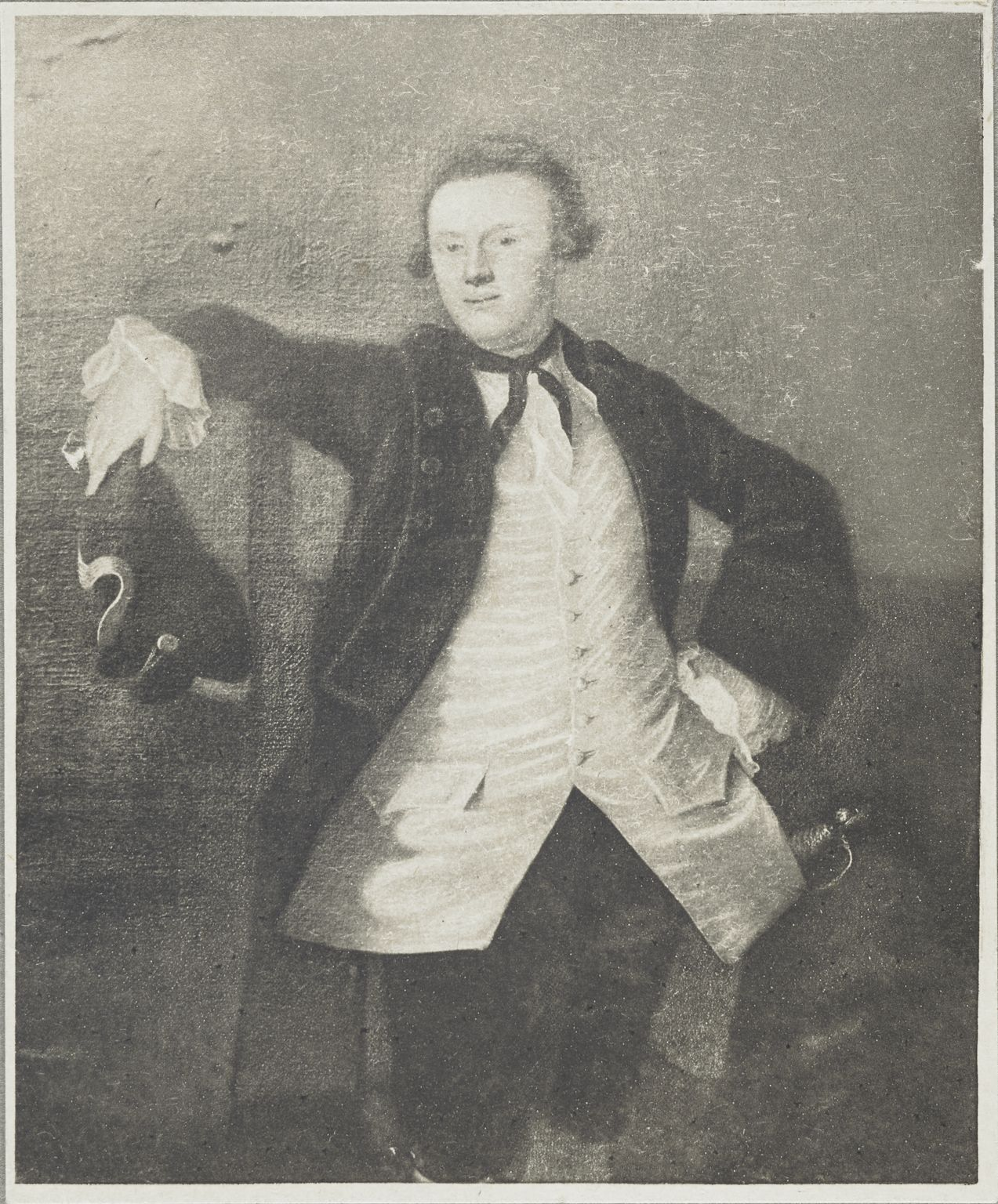
- portrait by Joseph Blackburn
- Born: May 25, 1736
- Died: October 7, 1800
- Children: Paul Babcock
- Parents: Joshua Babcock (father); Hannah Stanton Babcock (mother)

Henry Babcock (May 25, 1736 – October 7, 1800) was a colonial American military officer.

Henry Babcock was born on May 25, 1736 in Westerly, Rhode Island.

He was a son of Chief Justice Joshua Babcock, of Rhode Island. He entered Yale College in 1748 and graduated in 1752. He then entered the army, became a captain at eighteen years of age, and at nineteen served under Col. Ephraim Williams at the Battle of Lake George. He was major in 1756, lieutenant-colonel in 1757, and in 1758 colonel of a Rhode Island regiment that took part in the unsuccessful attempt to capture Ticonderoga. Here he was wounded in the knee. He was afterward present at the capture of the place by Sir Jeffrey Amherst, in 1759.

Babcock then spent a year in England and went home when the War of the Revolution broke. He settled at Stonington, Connecticut, and in February, 1776, was made commander of the troops at Newport, R.I., but in May was removed on account of insanity.

After the war, Henry Babcock engaged in the practice of law. An account also stated that he founded a school that catered to Mohawk Indians. He applied and was accepted to the Holy Orders in the Church of England and was later recorded as a Lake Superior copper speculator. He married Mary Stanton, who came from the same family as his mother. They had two sons, Paul and Dudley Babcock. He died on 7 October 1800 in Stonington.
