= West Warwick, Rhode Island =

- Town
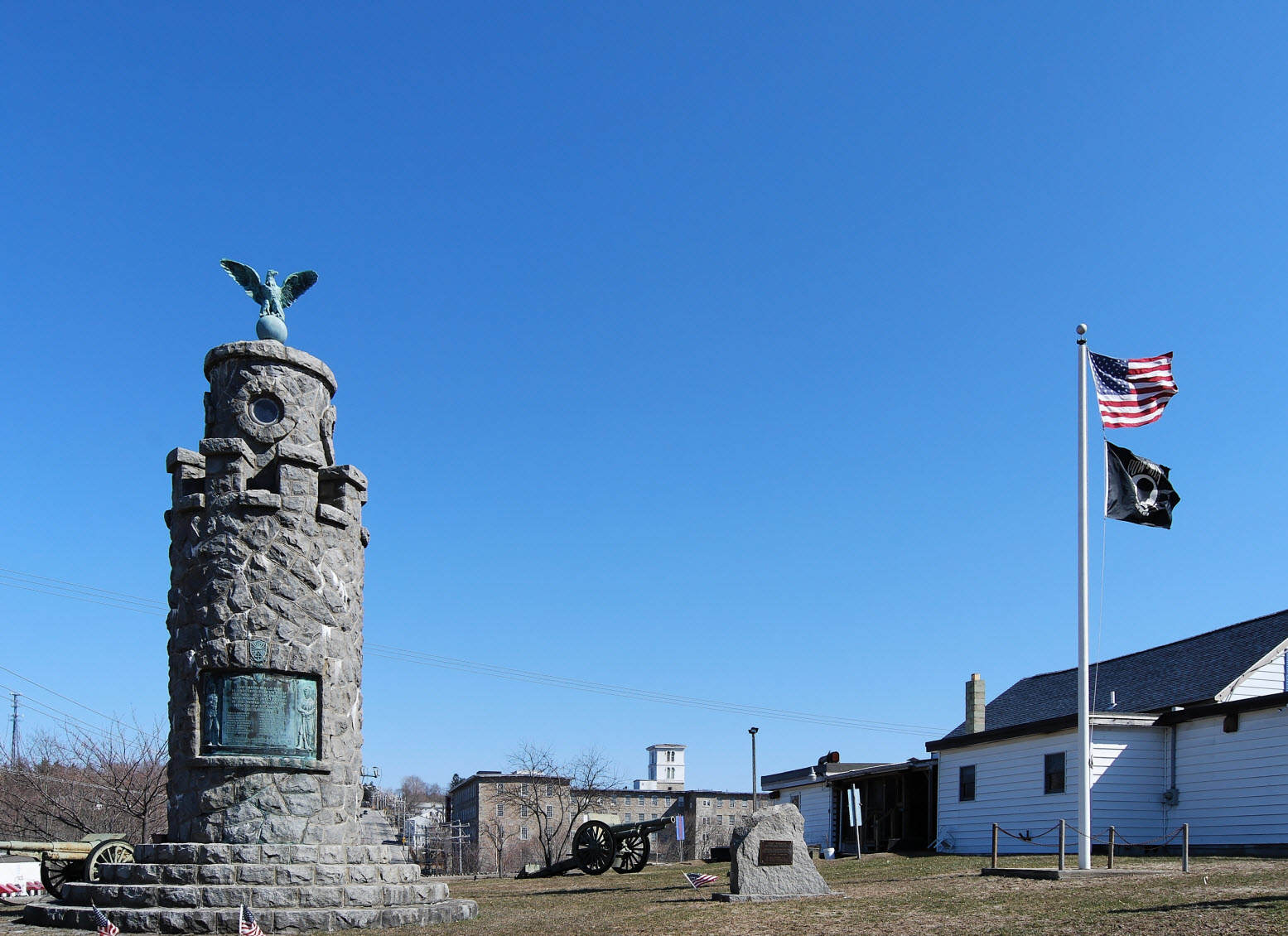
- War Memorial Park West Warwick

- Seal Coat of arms Logo

- Location in Kent County and the state of Rhode Island.
- Coordinates: 41°42′N 71°31′W
- Country: United States
- State: Rhode Island
- County: Kent

Government
  - Town Council: Ward 1 – Maribeth Williamson (Democrat); Ward 2 – David Gosselin, Jr. (Democrat); Ward 3 – Jason K. Messier (Independent); Ward 4 – Jason E. Licciardi (Independent); Ward 5 – Mark Bourget (Republican)

Area
  - Total: 8.1 sq mi (21.0 km^{2})
  - Land: 7.9 sq mi (20.5 km^{2})
  - Water: 0.19 sq mi (0.5 km^{2})
- Elevation: 269 ft (82 m)

Population (2020)
  - Total: 31,012
  - Density: 3,918/sq mi (1,512.8/km^{2})
- Time zone: UTC−5 (Eastern (EST))
  - Summer (DST): UTC−4 (EDT)
- ZIP code: 02893
- Area code: 401
- FIPS code: 44-78440
- GNIS feature ID: 1220060
- Website: westwarwickri.gov

West Warwick is a town in Kent County, Rhode Island, United States. The population was 31,012 at the 2020 census.

West Warwick was incorporated in 1913, making it the youngest town in the state. Prior to 1913, the town, situated on the western bank of the Pawtuxet River, was the population and industrial center of the larger town of Warwick. The town split because local Democratic politicians wanted to consolidate their power and isolate their section of town from the Republican-dominated farmland in the east.

== History ==
The area that is now the town of West Warwick was the site of some of the earliest textile mills in the United States situated along the banks of the north and south branches of the Pawtuxet River. These small mill villages of the Pawtuxet River Valley would play an important role in the early development of the textile industry in North America. Lippitt Mill, founded in 1809 by Revolutionary War hero Christopher Lippitt, was one of the first mills in the area.

The 1810 Lippitt Mill is on the National Register of Historic Places, and is one of the earliest textile mills in Rhode Island. It was founded in 1809 and the current dam was constructed in 1889. The Mill is one of the earliest textile mills in Rhode Island and is one of the oldest American textile mills still used for manufacturing. Another mill center, River Point, is located at the junction of the North and South branches of the Pawtuxet River, and is home to several mills which have been converted to residences, and which make up the Royal Mill Complex. The Original Bradford Soap Works, located in the Valley Queen Mill, dates back to the 1800s and is still in use today.

The Station, a nightclub and music venue on Cowesett Avenue, was destroyed in a fire on February 20, 2003, that killed 100 people and injured 230 others. The fire occurred during a concert by the rock band Great White, when a pyrotechnic display ignited packing foam that had been used to soundproof the building. The site where the Station once stood was turned into a permanent memorial, Station Fire Memorial Park, which was opened in May 2017.

In 2010, a massive rainfall caused the Pawtuxet River to rise to 21 feet, which is 12 feet above flood stage which caused flooding through much of the town.

== Geography ==
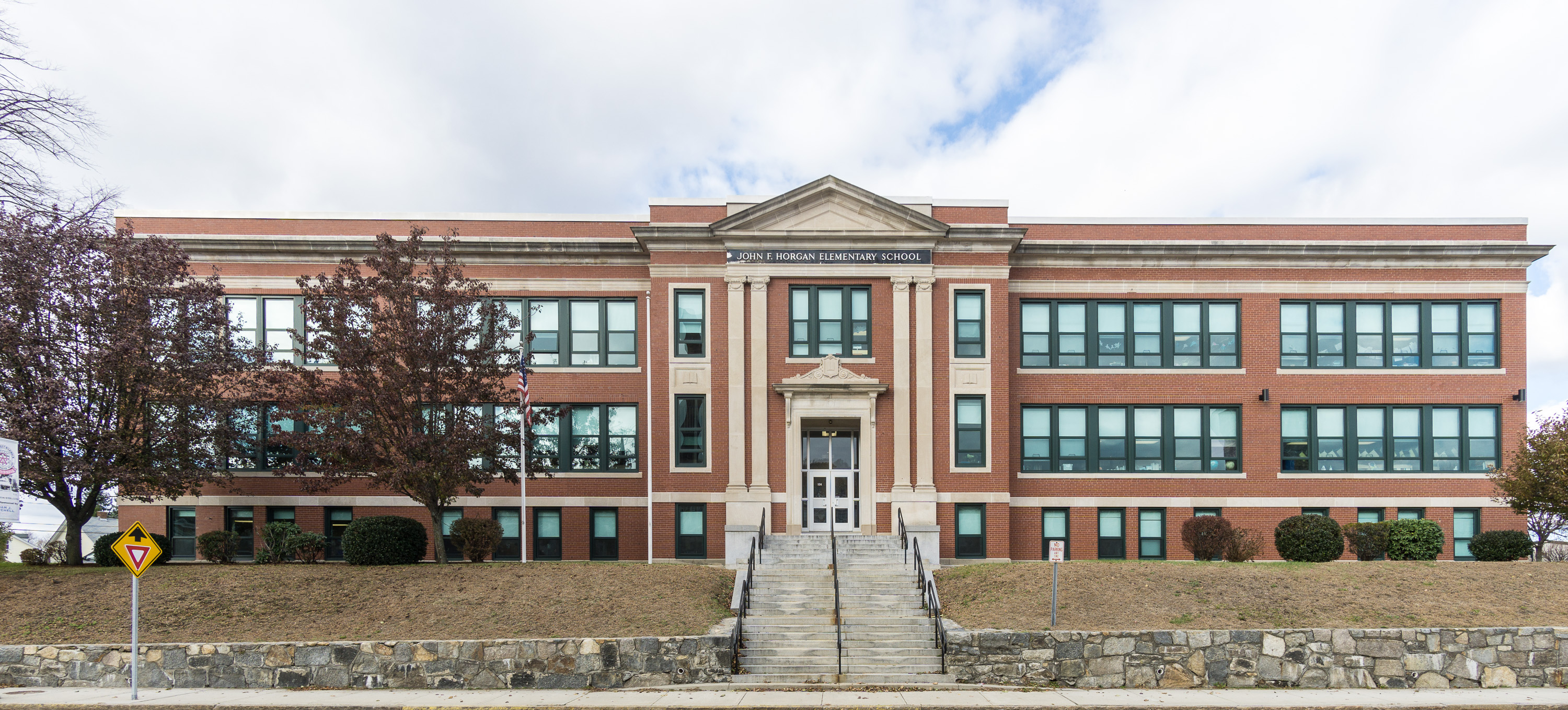
John F. Horgan Elementary School

According to the United States Census Bureau, the CDP has a total area of 8.1 square miles (21 km^{2}), of which, 7.9 square miles (20 km^{2}) of it is land and 0.2 square miles (0.52 km^{2}) of it (2.22%) is water.

The following villages are located in West Warwick:

- Arctic, found in the center of West Warwick where most of the town municipal buildings are located
- Birch Hill, originally an independent village, it stopped identifying as Birch Hill around the end of the nineteenth century, and is considered a part of Clyde. It was located in northern West Warwick on the opposite side of the river from Clyde Printworks.
- Centerville, home to the second ever mill erected in the United States, and the first textile mill in West Warwick (while it was still a part of Warwick). It is found in the center of West Warwick at the crossroads of Legris Avenue, Main Street, and West Warwick Avenue.
- Clyde
- Crompton
- Harris, located on the north branch of the Pawtuxet River, it has sections in both West Warwick and Coventry. It was named for Elisha Harris, who in 1822 built a new mill opposite the original wooden mill. It was also once known as Harrisville.
- Jericho is now considered a part of Arctic
- Lippitt, home to the historic Lippitt Mill, which was constructed in 1809
- Natick, a neighborhood in the northeast section of the town.
- Phenix, in the northwest corner of the town, is the site of the William B. Spencer home, built in the early 1870s, and now listed in the National Register of Historic Places. The area became in later years a mainly Portuguese area.
- River Point, home to the historic Royal Mills and to Horgan Elementary School
- Westcott, one of the only villages that did not grow up around a factory, it provided housing for the mill workers in neighboring Riverpoint. It is located in northern West Warwick, at the juncture of New London Avenue, Tollgate Road, and Providence Street.

The town is bordered by the city of Warwick on the east, the town of Coventry on the west, the city of Cranston on the North, and town of East Greenwich on the south.

== Demographics ==
Historical population
| Census | Pop. | Note | %± |
|---|---|---|---|
| 1920 | 15,461 | | — |
| 1930 | 17,696 | | 14.5% |
| 1940 | 18,188 | | 2.8% |
| 1950 | 19,096 | | 5.0% |
| 1960 | 21,414 | | 12.1% |
| 1970 | 24,323 | | 13.6% |
| 1980 | 27,026 | | 11.1% |
| 1990 | 29,268 | | 8.3% |
| 2000 | 29,581 | | 1.1% |
| 2010 | 29,191 | | −1.3% |
| 2020 | 31,012 | | 6.2% |
U.S. Decennial Census

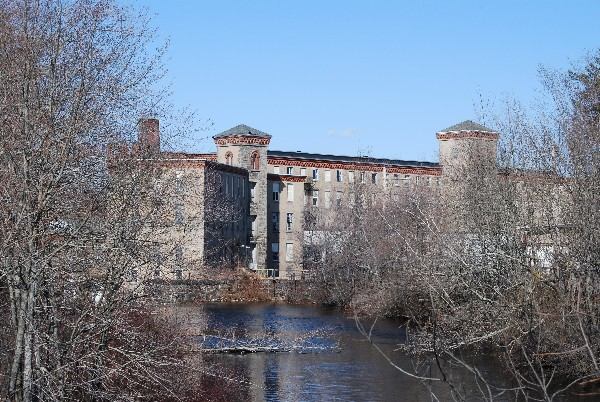
Historic Centerville Mill

As of the census of 2020, there were 31,012 people and 14,350 households in the town. The population density was 3,959.7 inhabitants per square mile (1,528.8/km^{2}). There were 14,414 housing units in the town. The racial makeup of the town was 82.41% White, 2.97% African American, 0.56% Native American, 2.68% Asian, 0.04% Pacific Islander, 1.44% from other races, and 3.5% from two or more races. Hispanic or Latino of any race were 8.62% of the population.

There were 14,350 households, out of which 24.2% had children under the age of 18 living with them, 38.7% were married couples living together, 25% had a female householder with no spouse present, and 23.3% had a male householder with no spouse present. 16.9% of all households were made up of individuals, and 3.6% had someone living alone who was 65 years of age or older. The average household size was 2.15 and the average family size was 2.68.

In the town, the population was spread out, with 15.8% under the age of 18, 8.1% from 18 to 24, 29.6% from 25 to 44, 27.6% from 45 to 64, and 18.9% who were 65 years of age or older. The median age was 42 years.

The median income for a household in the town was $73,903, and the median income for a family was $89,776. The per capita income for the town was $42,904. About 9.8% of the population were below the poverty line, including 10.3% of those under age 18 and 10.0% of those age 65 or over.

== Government ==
West Warwick has a council-manager form of government. There are five town councilors, one for each of the town's wards. Each is elected to a two-year term.

In the Rhode Island Senate, West Warwick is split in its representation between Democrats Adam J. Satchell (District 9) and Hanna M. Gallo (District 27). At the federal level, West Warwick is included in Rhode Island's 2nd congressional district and is currently represented by Democrat Seth Magaziner.

In terms of presidential politics, West Warwick has been a reliably Democratic stronghold in most elections; however, in 2016, Donald Trump became the first Republican to carry the town, albeit narrowly and with a plurality, in three decades.

West Warwick town vote by party in presidential elections
| Year | GOP | DEM | Others |
|---|---|---|---|
| 2024 | 49.89% 7,086 | 47.86% 6,797 | 2.25% 320 |
| 2020 | 46.38% 6,493 | 51.67% 7,234 | 0.02% 274 |
| 2016 | 47.56% 5,724 | 46.03% 5,540 | 6.41% 772 |
| 2012 | 37.45% 4,332 | 60.14% 6,956 | 2.41% 279 |
| 2008 | 38.08% 4,735 | 60.11% 7,475 | 1.81% 225 |
| 2004 | 40.42% 4,654 | 57.84% 6,660 | 1.74% 200 |
| 2000 | 31.34% 3,365 | 63.34% 6,801 | 5.32% 571 |
| 1996 | 22.64% 2,434 | 62.58% 6,727 | 14.78% 1,589 |
| 1992 | 28.02% 3,792 | 45.32% 6,134 | 26.66% 3,609 |
| 1988 | 46.20% 5,288 | 53.42% 6,114 | 0.38% 43 |

== Notable people ==
- Wendy Davis, former Democratic Texas state senator and 2014 Democratic gubernatorial nominee
- Robert E. Quinn, 58th Governor of Rhode Island and Judge for the Rhode Island Superior Court
- Mike Roarke, Major League Baseball catcher and coach
- Xavier Truss, American football guard
- Bob Wylie, National Football League coach

== See also ==
- West Warwick High School
- 1922 New England Textile Strike
