= Aaron Lopez =

Portuguese-born merchant, slave trader, and philanthropist

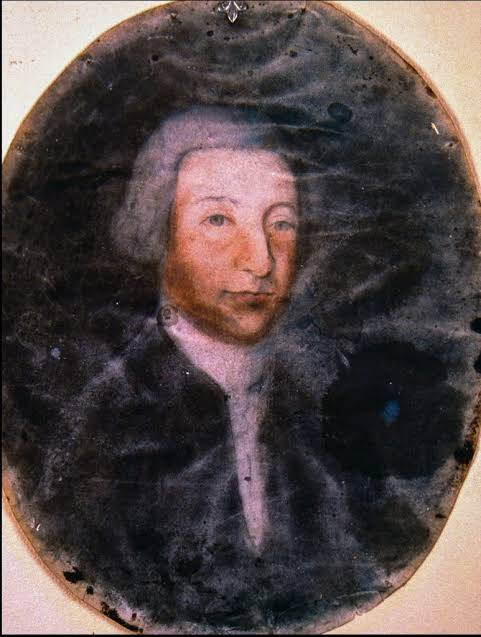
- Mid-18th century portrait of Lopez
- Born: 1731; Lisbon, Portugal
- Died: May 28, 1782 (aged 50-51); Newport, Rhode Island
- Resting place: Newport, Rhode Island
- Occupations: Merchant, slave trader

Aaron Lopez (born Duarte Lopez; 1731 – May 28, 1782) was a Portuguese-born merchant, slave trader, and philanthropist. Born in Lisbon into a converso family, he moved to British America, settling in the colony of Rhode Island and Providence Plantations. Through his varied commercial ventures, Lopez became the wealthiest person in Newport, Rhode Island. In 1761 and 1762, Lopez unsuccessfully sued the colonial government of Rhode Island in an attempt to become a British subject.

== Early life ==
Duarte Lopez was born in 1731 in Lisbon, Portugal. He belonged to a family of conversos, Portuguese Jews whose ancestors had converted to Catholicism, although the family continued to practice Judaism in secret. In eighteenth-century Portugal, such families lived under the authority of the Inquisition, which investigated suspected “Judaizing,” including the private observance of Jewish rituals within the home. In 1750 Lopez married a woman named Anna, and within two years she gave birth to a daughter, Catherine. Anna died on May 14, 1762, at age 36. In the summer of 1763, Lopez took Sarah Rivera, the New York–born daughter of Jacob Rodriguez Rivera, for a wife. Sarah, 16 years Aaron's junior, would bear him 10 children. Aaron's older brother José had left Portugal years earlier, settled in Newport, and began to openly practise Judaism, adopting the name Moses. Moses was naturalized in 1740 and granted a license by the General Assembly to make potash in 1753, and he became a successful merchant in Newport. In 1752 Duarte and his family moved to Newport, where they were able to openly practice Judaism and reclaimed Jewish names, becoming Aaron, Abigail, and Sarah. This transition marked a shift from concealed religious life in Portugal to public participation in one of the largest Sephardic Jewish communities in British North America.

== Merchant and slave trader ==
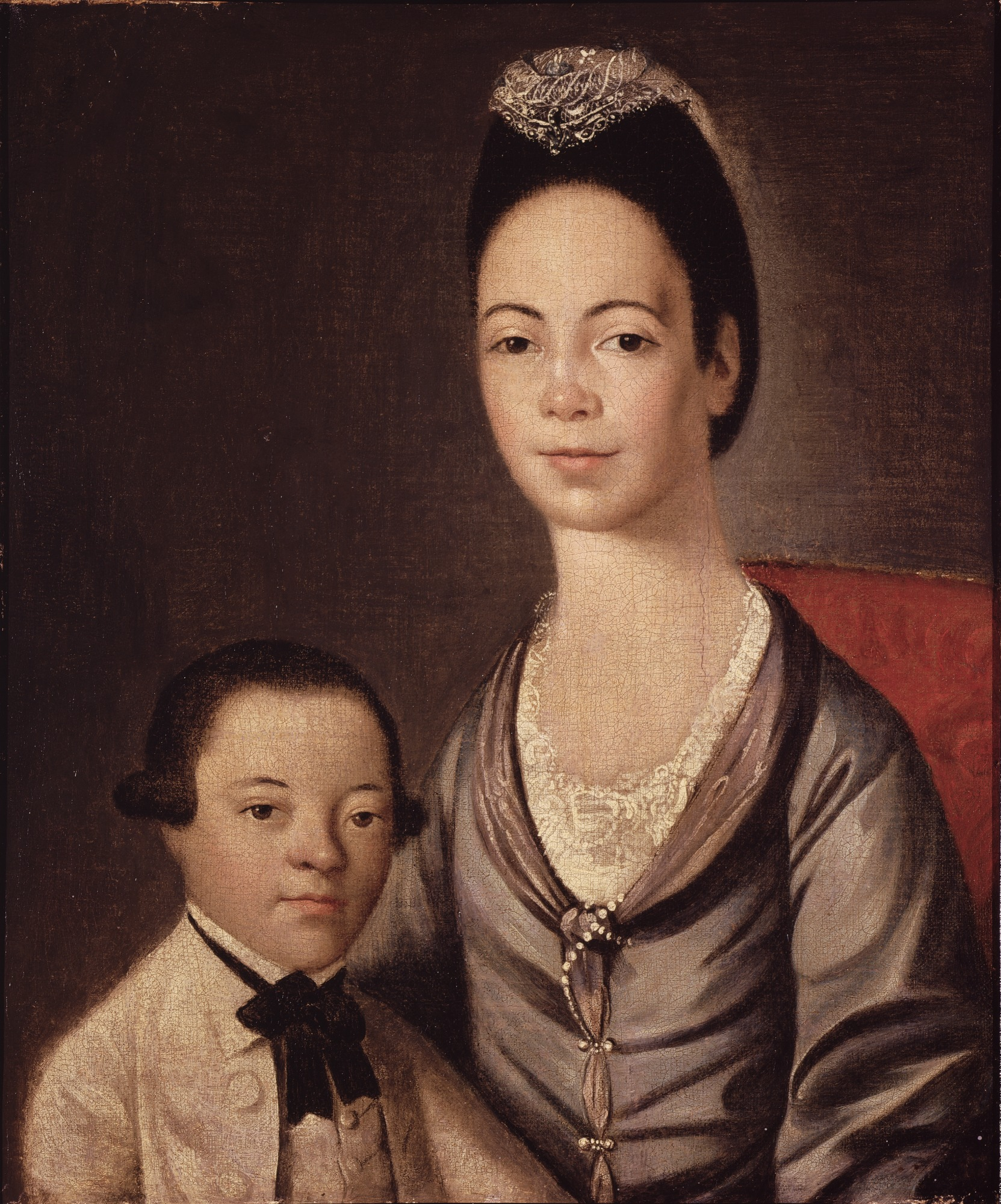
Lopez's wife and her son Joshua Lopez, painted by Gilbert Stuart

Lopez established himself as a shopkeeper in Newport shortly after his arrival. By 1755 he was buying and selling goods throughout Rhode Island and dealing with agents in Boston and New York. One of Lopez's early business interests was the trade in spermaceti, a wax extracted from whale oil used in candle production. Lopez built a candle-making factory in Newport in 1756. By 1760, a dozen competitors had built similar plants in New England. Whalers could not supply the factories with enough spermaceti to meet demand, and the price of whale oil increased. In 1761, Lopez joined eight other merchants to form a trust to control the cost and distribution of whale oil. Lopez expanded his trade beyond the North American coastline and by 1757 had major interests in the West Indian trade, which was closely connected to plantation economies dependent on enslaved labor. He also sent ships to Europe and the Canary Islands. Between 1761 and 1774, Lopez participated in the Atlantic slave trade as a financier and merchant investor. Historian Eli Faber determined that Lopez underwrote 21 slave ships during a period in which Newport sent a total of 347 slave ships to Africa. These voyages formed part of the triangular trade system, in which vessels carried goods from New England to the West African coast, where they were exchanged for captive Africans, who were then transported across the Atlantic in the Middle Passage and sold into slavery in the Caribbean and the Americas. According to historical studies of the Middle Passage, enslaved Africans were typically confined in overcrowded ship holds for voyages lasting several weeks to months, with mortality rates on many voyages reaching 10–20 percent due to disease, malnutrition, and conditions aboard ship. By underwriting such voyages, Lopez provided capital, supplies, and commercial backing that enabled these operations to take place. By the beginning of the American Revolution, Lopez owned or controlled 30 vessels engaged in European and West Indian trade and in whale fisheries. By the early 1770s, Lopez had become the wealthiest person in Newport; his tax assessment was twice that of any other resident. His success was attributed to the breadth of his commercial activities, which included the manufacture of spermaceti candles, ships, barrels, rum, and chocolate, as well as investments in textiles, clothing, shoes, hats, and bottles. These enterprises operated within an Atlantic trading system that included and profited from enslaved labor and slave-produced commodities such as sugar and molasses. Ezra Stiles, the Congregational minister in Newport and future president of Yale College, described Lopez as "a merchant of the first eminence" and wrote that the "extent of [his] commerce probably [was] surpassed by no merchant in America". In the mid-1770s, with growing tensions between Britain and its North American colonies, Lopez's fortunes began to decline. The Continental Association enforced a boycott against trade with Britain. In October 1775, a Royal Navy force anchored outside Newport's harbour and the population began to evacuate the city. In early 1776 Lopez relocated to Portsmouth, Rhode Island, then to Providence, Boston, and finally to Leicester, Massachusetts. Historian Marilyn Kaplan describes Lopez's losses during the American Revolution as "monumental."

== Philanthropy ==
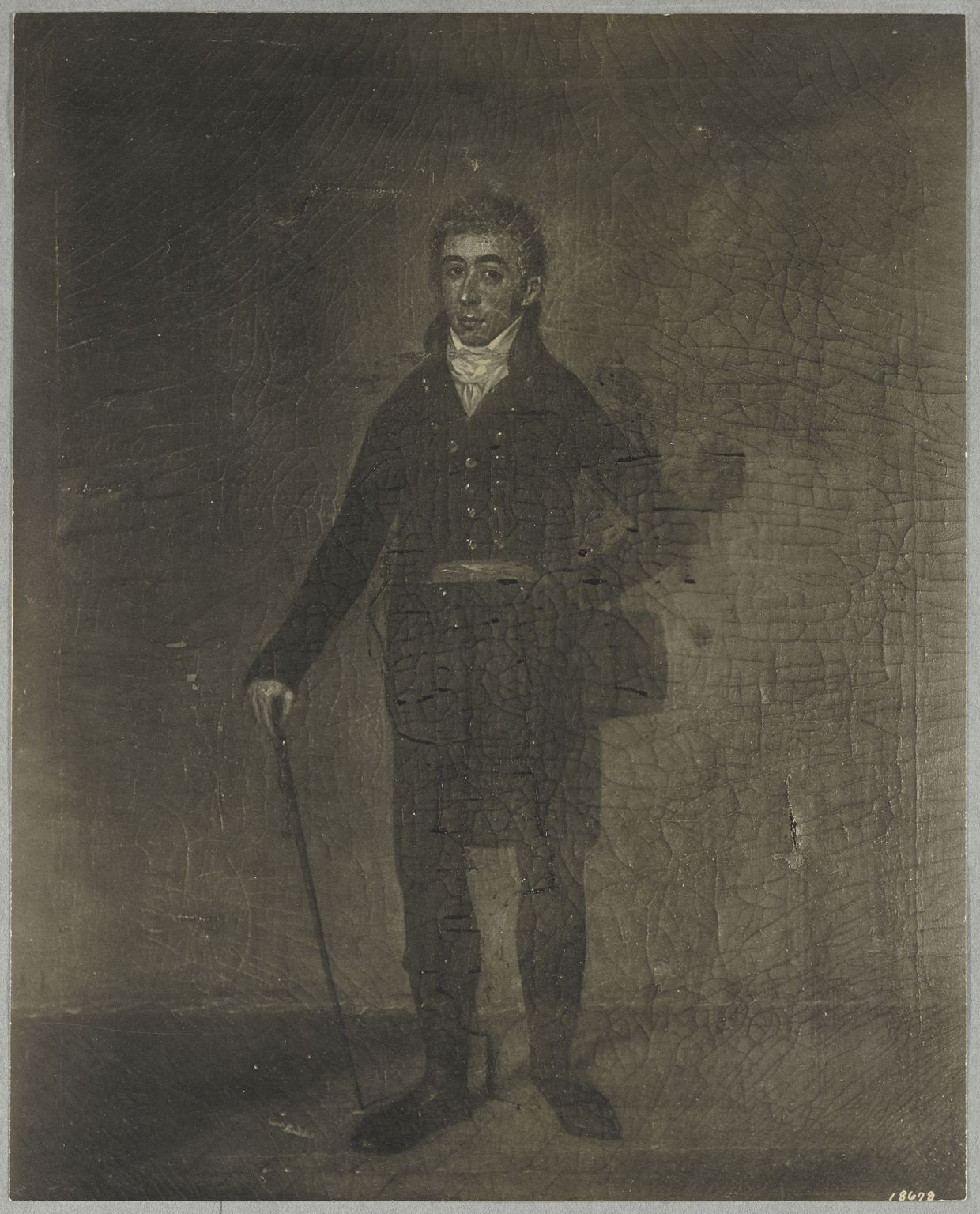
Aaron Lopez painted by an anonymous 18th century American artist

Lopez supported a number of charitable causes in Newport. He purchased books for the Redwood Library and Athenaeum. He contributed lumber to help build the College in the English Colony of Rhode Island and Providence Plantations (which later relocated to Providence and eventually became Brown University), and he donated land to establish Leicester Academy in Leicester, Massachusetts. It has been said about him that he was 'a man of eminent probity and benevolence whose bounties were widely diffused, not confined to creed or sect.'

Lopez was a leading contributor who helped build the Touro Synagogue, and he was given the honor of laying one of its cornerstones.

During the American Revolution, Lopez harbored Jewish refugees in his Leicester home. Referring to those sheltered by Lopez, a friend wrote in jest that "your family at present are in a number only 99 and still there is room for one more".

== Citizenship ==
In 1761, Lopez applied to the Rhode Island Superior Court to become a naturalized citizen. Under the Naturalization Act 1740, any foreign Protestant who had resided in Britain's American colonies for seven years could become a British subject; while Catholics were excluded by the law, special provisions were allowed for the religious scruples of both Quakers and Jews. Although he met the conditions set by law, Lopez's request was denied by the colonial government of Rhode Island. Another qualified Jew, Isaac Elizer, was also denied citizenship.

Lopez and Elizer appealed to the Rhode Island General Assembly. The lower house approved their request and required that the men return to the Superior Court to take an oath of allegiance, but the terms of their citizenship would be limited: Jews could become citizens of Rhode Island, but they would not be allowed to vote or serve in public office.

Lopez and Elizer fared worse in the upper house of the legislature. There they were told that the British Parliament had given the courts, not the legislature, jurisdiction over naturalization. If they wished to become citizens, Lopez and Elizer would have to appeal to the Superior Court.

The Superior Court heard the pair's appeal on March 11, 1762. Their application was denied a second time. The court reasoned that the 1740 act was intended to increase the population of the colony, and since the colony had grown crowded the law no longer applied. The court also noted that under a 1663 Rhode Island law, only Christians could become citizens. Lopez and Elizer could not become citizens of Rhode Island.

Determined to become a citizen, Lopez made inquiries to learn whether he could become naturalized in another colony. In April 1762 he moved temporarily to Swansea, Massachusetts. On October 15, 1762, Lopez became a citizen of Massachusetts and then returned to Newport. Historians believe Lopez was the first Jew to become a naturalized citizen of Massachusetts.

== Death ==
On May 28, 1782, while returning with his family from Leicester to Newport, he drowned when his horse and carriage fell into a pond. He was buried in the Jewish cemetery in Newport.

== See also ==
- History of the Jews in Colonial America
- Jewish views on slavery
- List of Rhode Island slave traders

== Sources ==
- Chyet, Stanley F. (1970). Lopez of Newport: Colonial American Merchant Prince. Detroit: Wayne State University Press. ISBN 0-8143-1407-4.
- Faber, Eli (1998). Jews, Slaves, and the Slave Trade: Setting the Record Straight. New York: New York University Press. ISBN 0-8147-2638-0.
- Feldberg, Michael, ed. (2002). "Aaron Lopez's Struggle for Citizenship". Blessings of Freedom: Chapters in American Jewish History. New York: American Jewish Historical Society. ISBN 0-88125-756-7.
- Friedman, Saul S. (1998). Jews and the American Slave Trade. New Brunswick, N.J.: Transaction Publishers. ISBN 0-7658-0660-6.
- The Historical Research Department of the Nation of Islam (1991). The Secret Relationship Between Blacks and Jews. Chicago: Latimer Associates. ISBN 0-9636877-0-0.
- Jacobs, Joseph; L. Hühner; Max J. Kohler (1906). "Newport". In Isidore Singer; Cyrus Adler (eds.). Jewish Encyclopedia. New York: Funk & Wagnalls.
- Kaplan, Marilyn (2004). "The Jewish Merchants of Newport, 1749–1790". In George M. Goodwin; Ellen Smith (eds.). The Jews of Rhode Island. Waltham, Mass.: Brandeis University Press. ISBN 1-58465-424-4.
- Marcus, Jacob Rader; Marc Saperstein (1999) [1983]. "Rhode Island Refuses to Naturalize Aaron Lopez, March 1762". The Jew in the Medieval World: A Source Book, 315–1791. Cincinnati: Hebrew Union College Press. ISBN 0-87820-217-X.
- Pencak, William (2005). Jews & Gentiles in Early America: 1654–1800. Ann Arbor, Mich.: University of Michigan Press. ISBN 0-472-11454-9.
- Smith, Ellen; Jonathan D. Sarna (2004). "Introduction: The Jews of Rhode Island". In George M. Goodwin; Ellen Smith (eds.). The Jews of Rhode Island. Waltham, Mass.: Brandeis University Press. ISBN 1-58465-424-4.
