= West Warwick High School =

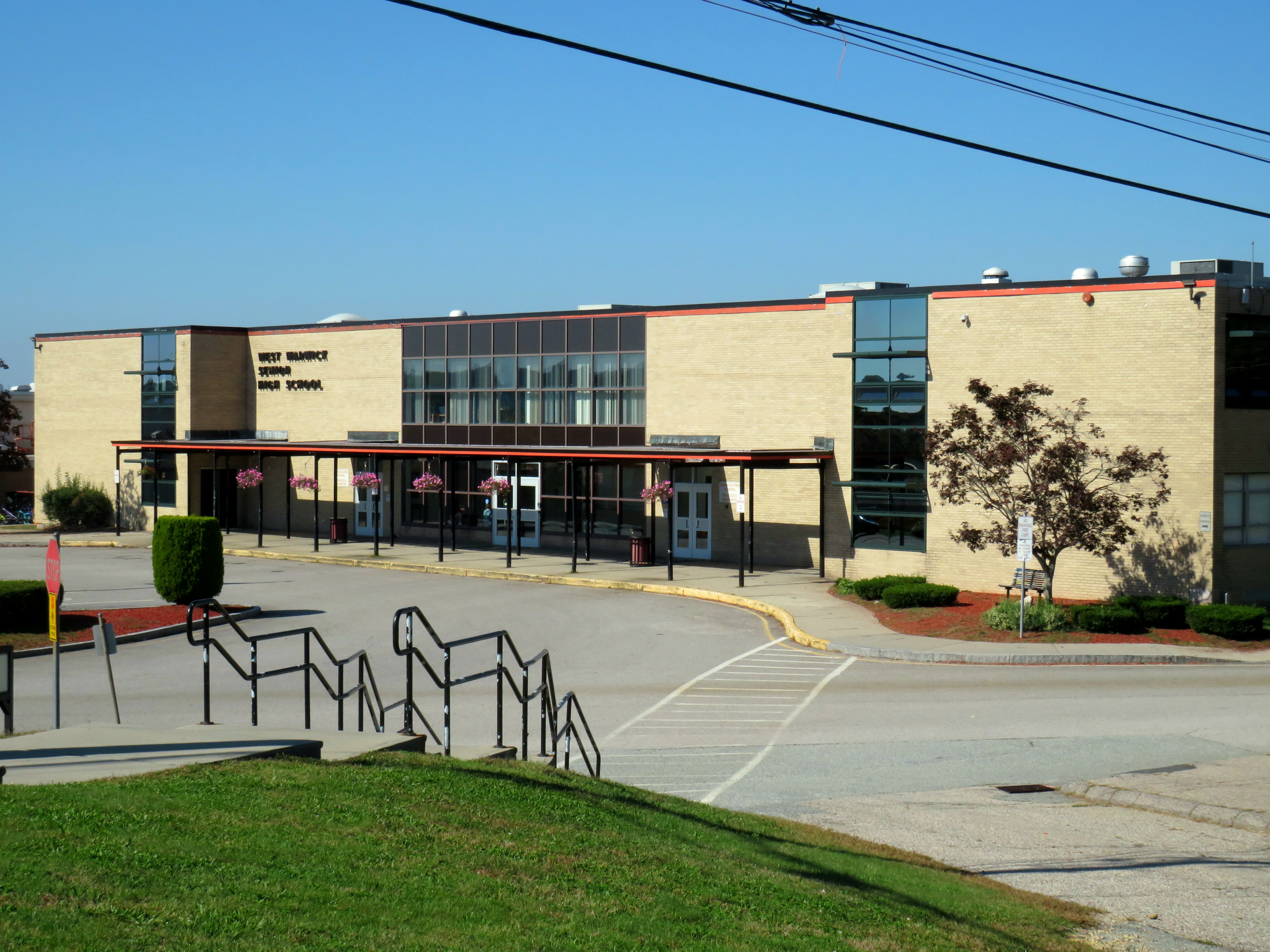

Location
- 1 Webster Knight Dr; West Warwick, Kent County, Rhode Island 02893; United States
- Coordinates: 41.709°N 71.516°W

Information
- Type: Public high school
- Motto: Choose love
- Founded: 1905
- School district: West Warwick Public Schools
- NCES District ID: 4401140
- Superintendent: Karen Tarasevich
- CEEB code: 400265
- NCES School ID: 440114000318
- Principal: Kristen Hinson
- Teaching staff: 80.00 (FTE)
- Grades: 9–12
- Gender: Coeducational
- Enrollment: 1,072 (2023–2024)
- Student to teacher ratio: 13.40
- Campus type: Suburban
- Colors: Orange and Black
- Mascot: Wizard
- Nickname: Wizards
- Rival: Coventry
- USNWR ranking: 7,534
- Newspaper: The Magic Word
- Website: sites.google.com/westwarwickpublicschools.com/west-warwick-high-school/home

West Warwick Senior High School (abbreviated as WWHS) is a public high school in West Warwick, Rhode Island, United States. In 2023, West Warwick High School is ranked 21st of 62 within Rhode Island by US News. The total enrollment is 1044 students; the total minority enrollment is 31%, and 48% of students are economically disadvantaged. West Warwick High School is the only high school in the West Warwick.

Students have the opportunity to follow a traditional college preparatory program, join one of Toll Gate High School's vocational program, or pursue a Rhode Island Department of Education (RIDE) Career-to-Education Pathway Program.

== Athletics ==
Logo for the West Warwick Wizards sports teams

The school is a member of the Rhode Island Interscholastic League. West Warwick High School's sports teams play in divisions II and III.

=== List of sports programs ===
Fall Sports

- Boys' Cross Country.
- Girls' Cross Country.
- Football – Plays in Division III-B, finishing the 23-24 Fall season 6-1 and ranking second (of 8 teams). They have won nineteen Division II championships in 1936, 1937, 1939, 1949, 1950, 1951–1954, 1956, 1957 , 1959, 1962, 1968, 1969, 1971, 1977, 1989, 1990, 1993, 2002, and most recently in 2013. They have won one Division I championship in 1983. Every year on Thanksgiving, West Warwick plays their rivals Coventry. West Warwick currently leads the series all time with 45 wins, Coventry has 12 wins, and the teams have tied twice. Coventry has won the last four match-ups, most recently winning 34–0.
- Boys' Soccer.
- Girls' Soccer – Plays in Division II, finishing the 23-24 Fall season 2-7-4 and ranking twelfth (of 14 teams). They have won five Division III championships, winning in 1989, 2000, 2001, 2013, and most recently in 2014. They also have two Division II championships in 1990 and 1991.
- Girls' Tennis – Plays in Division III, finishing the 23-24 Fall season 5-9 and ranking eleventh (of 15 teams). They most recently won the Division IV championship in 2005.
- Girls' Volleyball - Plays in Division I, finishing the 23-24 Fall season 1-15 and ranking sixth (of 6 teams).

Winter sports

- Boys' Basketball – Plays in Division III, finishing the 23-24 Winter season 14-10 and ranking sixth (of 18 teams). They have won six Division II championships in 1969, 1971, 1978, 1983, 1984, and most recently in 1994.
- Girls' Basketball – Plays in Division II, fishing the 23-24 Winter season 16-8 and ranking fifth (of 15 teams). They were Division II champions 2023 after finishing as runner-ups in 2022. They have won two Division II championship in 1989 and most recently in 2023. They have also won two Division I championships in 1991 and 1992.
- Competition Cheerleading – In 2015 they were Medium School champions. In 2016 and 2017 they were Large School champions. In 2019 and 2020 they have won the state championship and the Co-Ed Division championship. Also in 2019 they were New England Co-Ed champions. In 2021, the cheerleading team won the Division III championship, Co-Ed Division championship, Division II championship, and Fall State champions. In 2022, they won the Winter Co-Ed Division championship, Winter State championship, New England Co-Ed Division championship, Division II championship, and Fall State championship.
- Gymnastics – They have won three Division II championships in 2004, 2012, and most recently in 2019.
- Ice Hockey – Plays on a joint team with Exeter-West Greenwich in Division II, finishing the 23-34 Winter season 10-15 and ranking eighth (of 11 teams). They have won four Division III championships in 1982, 1988, 2013, and most recently in 2020.
- Boys' Indoor track – Competes in the "Suburban" division, finishing the 23-34 Winter season 4-7 and ranking eighth (of 12 teams).
- Girls' Indoor track – Competes in the "Headley" division, finishing the regular 23-24 Winter season 3-5 and ranking fifth (of 9 teams). At the state championships, they won the Medium Class division in 2023.
- Swimming.
- Wrestling – Competes in Division II, finishing the 23-24 Winter season 2-4 and ranking eighth (of 11 teams).
- Unified basketball – Play in the Central Division, most recently finishing 1–3 in 2021.

Spring sports

- Baseball - Plays in Division III, finishing the 22-23 Spring season 19-4-1 and ranking third (of 13 teams).
- Softball – Plays in Division II, finishing the 22-23 Spring season 9-6 and ranking seventh (of 16 teams).
- Golf – Plays in the "central" division, finishing the 22-23 Spring season +427 Total to Par Gross and ranking fifth (of 7 teams). They have won 10 State championships in 1940, 1948, 1950, 1951, 1959, 1961–1963, 1969, and most recently in 1970.
- Boys' Outdoor track – Competes in the "Southern" division, finishing the 22-23 Spring season 8-1 and ranking second (of 10 teams).
- Girls' Outdoor track – Competes in the "Southern" division, finishing the 22-23 Spring season7-2 and ranking third (of 10 teams). At the 2023 RIIL State Outdoor Track & Field, they won their first state championship.
- Boys' Tennis – Plays in Division II, finishing the Spring 22-23 season 4-7 and ranking seventh (of 10 teams). They have won one Division III championship in 2015, and they have also won one Division II championship in 2017.
- Boys' Volleyball.

=== Hazing allegations ===
On November 16, 2022, reports were released about hazing allegations regarding the West Warwick football team and the school itself, mainly having to due with the junior varsity players and team. The superintendent was notified of the alleged incident and suspended seven football players as a result on November 10. It was in question whether or not the team would be able to play in their next, and final, football game. The school had hired a private investigator. The current head coach of the team has been connected to the North Smithfield High School's hazing allegations as well, as he was previously the head coach for the team prior to the reports being released. A closed-door parent meeting held on November 17, 2022, proved to not be beneficial as parents were left with more questions than answers. The annual Thanksgiving day game against the Coventry Oakers was played despite ongoing investigations being conducted on both teams. The game resulted in a 34–0 win for the Oakers. As of January 2023, no formal charges have been pressed and all parties involved have returned to school.

== Clubs and activities ==
Below is a list of all clubs and extra curricular activities (as of 2023):

- Broadcasting Club
- Chess Club
- Chorus
- Concert Band
- Wind ensemble
- Drama Club (see below)
- French Club
- Gay/Straight Alliance (GSA)
- Dungeons & Dragons Club
- Torta Club
- Interscholastic League Sports (see above)
- Italian Club
- Jazz Band
- Leadership Circle
- Magic Club
- Magic Word (student newspaper)
- Math Club
- Mock Trial
- National Honor Society
- Rhode Island Honor Society
- SADD/DARE Role Models
- Ski Trip
- Spanish Club
- STEM Club
- Student Council
- Tri-M Music Honor Society
- VASSA
- Visual Arts Honor Society
- World Language Honor Society
- Yearbook Committee (West Warwick Chronicle)

== Performing arts ==
The performing arts, have helped to bring national status to the school in recent years. The West Warwick High School Jazz Ensemble "A" Band has won numerous awards including placing third in the National Jazz Festival in 2024. They have also been in the Finals of the Berklee College of Music High School Jazz Festival in 2002 to 2007, 2009, and 2012 to 2014; winning the prestigious festival in 2007 and 2014. The Concert Band and Concert Chorale have competed and won local and national awards and titles the past twenty years.

The West Warwick High School Players produce musical productions and have performed since 2009. In 2015, they were the first and only Rhode Island high school to participate in the Connecticut High School Theater Awards, the regional division of the National High School Musical Theater Awards (NHSMTA). In 2019, senior Myranda Silva won regionals and advanced to The Jimmy Awards in New York City.

In 2022, West Warwick High School won the nationwide "Love Is An Open Door" contest by the Disney Theatrical Group and was chosen as the Rhode Island representative in the 50 States of Frozen. This gave the school exclusive rights to perform Disney's Frozen in spring 2023. They earned 26 nominations and 13 wins for the production in the inaugural year of the Ocean State Star Awards.

== Alumni ==
- Tom Garrick (class of 1984) Professional basketball player and coach
- Frank "Monk" Maznicki – (class of 1938) American football running back. The West Warwick High School football field is named in his honor
- Jim Mello – (class of 1938) American football fullback and linebacker
- Chuck Palumbo – (class of 1989) Professional wrestler and builder of custom motorcycles
- Mike Roarke – (class of 1948) Professional baseball catcher
- Adam Satchell – (class of 1999) American politician. He served as a teacher and a guidance counselor in the West Warwick school system. Served as dean of students for West Warwick High School in 2022.
- Bob Wylie – (class of 1969) American football coach
