= Caleb Gardner =

American slave trader and slavery oligarch

Caleb Gardner (January 24, 1739 – December 24, 1806) of Newport, Rhode Island, was an American slave trader and slavery oligarch. He was the owner or part share owner of more than a dozen slave trade vessels. On many voyages, he was also the Captain of the ship.

When he was a boy, he lived near the harbor and owned a boat. This enabled him to become familiar with the waters and islands of Narragansett Bay. As a young man, he became proficient in the triangular trade, sailing his own ship to China and the East Indies. He became a prolific global slave trader, bringing thousands of humans in bondage to the shores of:

- Barbados
- Charleston, South Carolina
- Dominica
- Grenada and St. Kitts, West Indies
- Havana, Cuba
- Montgomery, Alabama
- New York
- Jamaica
- Rhode Island
- St. Helena
- St. Thomas, Virgin Islands, Danish West Indies

== Slave trade (1762–1775) ==
In 1762, at 23 years of age, Caleb Gardner was the Captain of the Newport sloop Rebecca and Joseph. As he made his way along the African coast, Gardner purchased enslaved captives at the Ivory and Gold Coasts and Benin. He purchased more captives at the Cape Coast Castle in Ghana. He departed from Cape Coast Castle on August 10, 1762, with 70 enslaved captives on board. When the sloop arrived at New York, 58 captives disembarked. Twelve Africans died during the voyage.

In 1762, he was spotted in Anomabo with 150 slaves on board by John Harwood, who had been on the schooner Success and had just returned from the Coast of Africa. Apparently, this is the same voyage as the "Captain Gardner" who purchased slaves in Africa, disembarked with 149 on board, and arrived with 126 captives in 1763.

In 1764, he completed four slave trade voyages as Captain of the following vessels:

- Triton or Tryton from Boston to Gambia, 118 captives embarked; 103 disembarked.
- Elizabeth from Newport to Cape Coast Castle, 120 disembarked; 89 disembarked at Rhode Island.
- Black Prince departing from Africa with 186 captives on board, and 145 that disembarked at Charleston.
- George departing from Liverpool, destination unknown. This voyage was unsuccessful. Two hundred captives were intended to be purchased. This 100-ton brig was shipwrecked or destroyed before the enslaved embarked, killing the 200 captives.

By 1765, Gardner was not only Captain but also owner of the vessel Triton (or Tryton), which made two voyages. From an unspecified African port, 148 captives embarked and 131 disembarked at Jamaica; 100 captives embarked at Cape Coast Castle and 87 disembarked at St. Kitts.

In 1766, as Captain of the Surprize [sic], he made a triangle trade voyage to Liverpool, then Bonny, where enslaved captives were purchased. He departed with 339 captives when he navigated to the West Indies. He made stops at St. Kitts and Barbados, where a total of 290 captives disembarked, then returned to Liverpool.

In 1767, Gardner appears to have been the Captain of the Peggy which stopped at the Cape Coast Castle, then proceeded to Grenada. The total number of captives and those who survived the journey are unknown.

From 1767 through 1774, Gardner traded slaves on at least five voyages as owner of the Rhode Island ship Black Prince, with three of those voyages as its Captain. Captives were taken from Africa (Gold Coast and Cape Coast Castle) to Barbados, and in one case from Anomabu to Dominica. On these voyages, a total of 774 captives embarked on the ship and 630 disembarked. A total of 118 captives died on these voyages.

== Revolutionary War ==
Gardner temporarily ceased his prolific triangle trade activities just before the Revolutionary War. In late 1775, he raised a company of militiamen. He was assigned with this company to Colonel William Richmond's Regiment. He became major and was promoted to lieutenant colonel on Aug. 19, 1776. He became a member of the council of war and of the Rhode Island state government.

He resided in Newport in 1778, when the French squadron under Count d'Estaing was blockaded there by the greatly superior British fleet under Admiral Howe. A sudden and dense fog prevented an immediate attack by the English, but they occupied both entrances to the harbor and waited for daylight.

Looking through a spyglass from his housetop, Captain Gardner noted the disposition of the hostile fleets. As soon as it was dark, he rowed himself to the ship of the French admiral and offered to pilot him to a safe position. He steered the admiral's ship through a channel that he had known from boyhood. The other vessels, with all lights extinguished, followed singly in his wake. After piloting the French beyond the enemy and to clear water, he returned to the island. He reached his own house before daylight. When the fog lifted, he was among the groups along the waterfront who marveled at the disappearance of the French fleet.

Count d'Estaing's report of the affair to Louis XVI was confidential, since its disclosure would have exposed Gardner to the dangerous displeasure of the English government and of the Tory element in Rhode Island. However, through his ambassador in the United States, the Chevalier de la Luzerne, the King sent a substantial sum of money to Gardner. With it, he bought an estate near Newport and built a house upon it, which later became known as "Bateman's."

Throughout the war, Colonel Gardner was said to be a trusted adviser of the French officers in Rhode Island and of enslaver General George Washington, who was his friend and correspondent. After peace was declared, Gardner was made French consul at Newport. He became president of a bank, warden of Trinity Church, and head of the volunteer fire department of the town.

Caleb Gardner and Peleg Clarke, who also was a well known slaving captain before the war, served as members of the Rhode Island assembly, one in the upper, the other in the lower house.

Newport slavers were men in an elite class of oligarchs who became very wealthy, very fast by trafficking in humans. Slavery oligarchs were a minority who controlled the economy in such a way that it best served the wealthy (themselves). They also controlled the majority of schools and universities, churches, mainstream newspapers, and public affairs in a way that guaranteed their personal power and wealth.

Before the Revolutionary War, Rhode Island was a dominant player in the global slave trade. "An Ethiopian could as soon change his skin as a Newport merchant could be induced to change so lucrative a trade as that in slaves for the slow profits of any manufactory." (William Ellery, 1791.)

By 1785, Caleb Gardner, Captain and owner of more than a dozen slave trade vessels, was again trafficking in enslaved human beings at ports around the world -- as if the war had never happened.

== Slave trade (1785–1806) ==
By 1785, Gardner had resumed his profiteering in the triangle trade. He owned multiple vessels that were built to sell rum and other goods to buy enslaved captives, transport the captives under brutal and inhumane conditions, then deliver those who survived the journey to their enslavers at the port of destination.

In 1785 and 1786, Gardner was the owner of the Newport, Rhode Island vessel Washington, which made two voyages to Africa and the Americas, with a total of 110 captives who embarked and a total of 90 who disembarked. William Gardner was the Captain on both voyages.

In 1789, The Pennsylvania Herald and New York General Advertiser published a notice for debt collection by William Gordon, Esq. of Bedford, against Caleb Gardner and Nathaniel Briggs, co-owners of the brigantine Hope, and its Captain John Stanton. The Hope had recently returned to Rhode Island after taking a cargo of African captives to the West Indies.

In 1790, Gardner and Nathaniel Briggs were co-owners of the Dove. The Captain of was Joseph Gardner. The Dove departed from a port in Rhode Island loaded with goods and arrived at an unspecified port in Africa. Departing from Africa were 97 captives. Six captives died on the journey; 91 embarked at Havana in March 1791.

=== Murder on the Bark ===
In June 1791, the State Gazette of North Carolina published this extract from a Newport, Rhode Island letter dated May 9, 1791:

On the 7th inst. [instant] arrived here from an African slave voyage (but last from the Havannah, where the slaves were sold) a bark belonging to this town, commanded by Capt. Wolf, owned by said Wolf and Caleb Gardner. One that was on board this vessel during the voyage informed me that a few days after they sailed from Africa, symptoms of the small pox appeared upon a female slave. She was kept in the main top three days, then taken down, brought to the side of the vessel, and thrown overboard by the Captain himself. It is said the reason of his drowning her was lest she should communicate the disorder to those on board who had not had it.

In 1792, Gardner was the Captain of the Dispatch from Liverpool to Africa, where 210 captives embarked. At its destination of St. Ann's Bay, 195 disembarked. Meanwhile, the Fanny of Rhode Island, co-owned by Caleb Gardner and William Gardner, completed a voyage to Africa, where 114 captives embarked. At an unknown destination, 93 disembarked.

In 1794, he captained the Ranger from Liverpool to West Central Africa and St. Helena. He took 183 captives to Kingston, where 181 disembarked.

In 1795, Gardner was owner of the vessel Hope. Captain William Gardner navigated the Hope from Rhode Island to Anomabu, where 83 captives embarked, and then to St. Thomas, where 67 disembarked.

In 1797, Capt. William Gardner navigated the Liberty from Newport, Rhode Island, to an unspecified port in Africa, where 76 captives embarked. At an unknown destination, 63 disembarked. This vessel was co-owned by Caleb Gardner, George Champlin, and James Robinson.

In 1798, as Captain of the Fair Penitent, Gardner navigated to Liverpool and Îles de Los (Islands of Los), Guinea, where 278 captives embarked. At its destination in Grenada, 253 disembarked.

In 1806, Caleb Gardner made his final slave trade voyage as Co-Captain and owner of the brig Trial. Henry Malbone was the other Co-Captain. The Trial left Newport Rhode Island for Mozambique, where 150 enslaved captives embarked. Twenty humans in bondage died on the journey. At Montgomery, 130 disembarked.

== House ==
In 1795, Gardner purchased the Bull-Mawdsley House, also called the Capt. John Mawdsley House, located at 228 Spring Street in Newport. One of the oldest houses in Rhode Island, it is believed to have been built about 1680 for the owner Jireh Bull, the husband of Godsgift Arnold -- the daughter of Benedict Arnold, the first Governor or Rhode Island. After Bull's death, wealthy enslaver and privateer Captain John Mawdsley purchased the house. While he owned it, Mawdsley added the large front addition and styled the house with elements of Georgian Classicism architecture. After Mawdsley's death in 1795, Gardner purchased the house and added Federal period entry and the marble front steps that are still a part of the house today.

The house was added to the National Register of Historic Places in 1983. Historic New England (SPNEA) owned the house until it was sold in the late twentieth century. The house is now privately owned.

The Library of Congress repository online has digitized photographs and drawings of the Captain John Maudsley House. During the 11 years that Caleb Gardner owned the house, Newport Gardner (Occramer Marycoo) lived on the property. Marycoo was an African singing school master and composer who was extraordinarily gifted. When he was 14 years of age, his mother entrusted him to the care of David Lindsay, Captain of the sloop Prince George. Lindsay promised her that her 14-year old son would be given an education in America. When the Prince George arrived at the colonies, Lindsay illegally sold Marycoo as a slave to Caleb Gardner instead.

== Death ==
Gardner died in Newport, Rhode Island, on December 24, 1806.

== See also ==
- List of Rhode Island slave traders
