= Sprague (surname) =

Sprague is a surname, and may refer to:

== A ==
- Abner E. Sprague (1850–1943), American pioneer in Colorado
- Achsa W. Sprague (1827–1862), American spiritualist
- Amasa Sprague (1798–1843), American businessman and politician from Rhode Island
- Amasa Sprague Jr. (1828–1902), American businessman and politician from Rhode Island
- Andrew Sprague (born 2005), American football player
- Augustus B. R. Sprague (Augustus Brown Reed Sprague, 1827–1910), American businessman, politician and military figure from Massachusetts
- Benona Sprague (1833–1908), United States Army corporal awarded the Medal of Honor

== B ==
- Billy Sprague (born 1952), American Christian musician
- Bud Sprague (1904–1973), American football player
- Burr Sprague (1836-1917), American lawyer and politician

== C ==
- Carl T. Sprague (1895-1979), American country musician
- Chandler Sprague (died 1955), American veteran, screenwriter and journalist
- Charles Sprague (poet) (1791–1875), American poet
- Charles A. Sprague (1887–1969), Governor of Oregon, 1939–1943
- Charles F. Sprague (1857–1902), American politician from Massachusetts
- Charles Ezra Sprague (1842–1912), American accountant
- Charles James Sprague (1823–1903), American botanist
- Charlie Sprague (1864–1912), American baseball player
- Clifton Sprague (1896–1955), American admiral during World War II

== D ==
- Dale Sprague, American politician
- David Sprague (1910–1968), Canadian football player
- David Sprague (rower) (born 1952), British rower
- Dick Sprague (1931–2008), American football player

== E ==
- E. Carleton Sprague (Eben Carleton Sprague 1822–1895), American lawyer and politician from New York
- Ed Sprague Sr. (1945–2020), American baseball pitcher
- Ed Sprague Jr. (born 1967), American baseball player
- Edward Sprague or Edward Spragge (c.1620–1673), Irish admiral of the Royal Navy
- Edward H. Sprague (1848–1930), American politician from Wisconsin
- Elmer Sprague (1924–2019), American philosopher and academic
- Eric Sprague (1894–1947), Australian rules footballer
- Erik Sprague (born 1972), American freak show and sideshow performer
- Ernest Sprague (1865–1938), American football player, public official and engineer
- Ernest L. Sprague (1876–1944), American politician from Rhode Island
- Ezra T. Sprague (1833–1888), American lawyer, politician and judge from Wisconsin

== F ==
- Farah Sprague (1891–1967), Persian-American writer, lecturer and hostess
- Frank J. Sprague (1857–1934), American naval officer, inventor and electrical engineer
- Frank Lee Sprague (1958–2018), American guitarist and composer
- Franklin B. Sprague (1825–1895), American military officer, businessman and judge
- Frederick Sprague (1794–1865), American farmer and politician from Wisconsin

== G ==
- George Sprague (1871–1963), American businessman and mayor of Dallas
- George F. Sprague (1902–1998), American geneticist
- George R. Sprague (1938–2016), American politician from Massachusetts

== H ==
- Henry H. Sprague (1841–1920), American lawyer and politician from Massachusetts
- Homer Sprague (1829–1918), American military officer, author and educator

== I ==
- Ian Sprague (1920–1994), Australian studio potter
- Isaac Sprague (1811–1895), American botanical illustrator
- Isaac W. Sprague (1841–1887), American sideshow performer

== J ==
- J. Russell Sprague (1886–1969), American politician
- Jack Sprague (born 1964), American racing driver
- Jake Sprague (born 1984), American rugby union footballer and coach
- Jo Ann Sprague (born 1931), American politician from Massachusetts
- John Sprague (doctor) (1718–1797), American physician
- John Allison Sprague (1844–1907), Canadian farmer and politician from Ontario
- J. Russell Sprague (John Russell Sprague, 1886–1969), American lawyer and politician from New York State
- John T. Sprague (1810–1878), United States Army officer
- John W. Sprague (1817–1894), American soldier and railroad executive
- Joseph Sprague (1783–1854), American businessman and politician from Brooklyn

== K ==
- Ken Sprague (born 1945), American bodybuilder, businessman and schoolteacher
- Ken Sprague (cartoonist) (1927–2004), English political cartoonist
- Kent Sprague, American singer, drummer and composer
- Kristen Babb-Sprague (born 1968), American synchronized swimmer

== L ==
- Leigh Sprague (born 1970), American attorney
- Lucian Sprague (1882–1960), American railroad executive
- Lucy J. Sprague (1851–1903), American suffragist
- Lucy Sprague, married name Lucy Sprague Mitchell (1878–1967), American educator, writer and college dean

== M ==
- Mansfield D. Sprague (1910–2006), American politician from Connecticut
- Martyn Sprague (born 1949), Welsh footballer
- Marshall Sprague (1909–1994), American journalist and author
- M. Estella Sprague (1870–1940), American home economist and academic administrator

== N ==
- Nathan B. Sprague (1787–1864), American farmer and politician from Rhode Island
- Nathan Turner Sprague (1828–1903), American businessman, banker and politician from Vermont

== O ==
- Oliver M. W. Sprague (1873–1953), American economist

== P ==
- Peleg Sprague (Maine politician) (1793–1880), American politician and judge
- Peleg Sprague (New Hampshire politician) (1756–1800), American politician
- Peter Sprague (born 1955), American jazz musician

== R ==
- Reg Sprague (1886–1972), New Zealand rugby league footballer
- Richard E. Sprague (1921–1996), American computer technician and Kennedy assassination researcher
- Robert Sprague (born 1973), American politician from Ohio
- Robert Sprague (racing driver) (born 1959), American stock car driver
- Robert C. Sprague (1900–1991), American inventor and founder of Sprague Electric
- Roderick Sprague (1933–2012), American anthropologist and archeologist
- R. B. Sprague (1937–2010), American artist
- Roger Sprague (1769–1848), American businessman and politician in New York and the Territory of Michigan
- Roland Sprague (1894–1967), German mathematician
- Royal Sprague (1814–1872), American judge in California

== S ==
- Samuel Sprague (1753–1844), American Revolutionary War officer, father of Charles Sprague the poet
- Stuart Sprague, American nephrologist
- Sydney Sprague (born 1992), American singer-songwriter and multi-instrumentalist

== T ==
- Thomas Archibald Sprague (1877–1958), Scottish botanist
- Thomas Bond Sprague (1830–1920), British actuary
- Thomas L. Sprague (1894–1972), American vice admiral in World War II

== V ==
- Viette Brown Sprague (1846–1923), American missionary in China

== W ==
- William Sprague (1609–1675), American settler
- William Sprague III (1799–1856), American industrialist and politician from Rhode Island
- William Sprague IV (1830–1915), American politician from Rhode Island, nephew of William Sprague III
- William Sprague (Michigan politician) (1809–1868), American politician
- William Buell Sprague (1795–1876), American minister and author
- W. G. R. Sprague (William George Robert Sprague 1863–1933), London theatre designer
- William P. Sprague (1827–1899), American politician from Ohio

== See also ==
- Spragg
- Spragge
