= Sprague =

Sprague may refer to:

== Places ==
Canada

- Sprague, Manitoba, a small town near the Minnesota/Manitoba border

United States

- Sprague, Alabama in Montgomery County, Alabama
- Sprague, Connecticut
- Sprague, Missouri
- Sprague, Nebraska
- Sprague, Washington
- Sprague, West Virginia
- Sprague, Wisconsin
- Sprague Field, on the campus of Montclair State University in New Jersey
- Sprague Lake (Colorado)
- Sprague Mountain
- Sprague River (Maine)
- Sprague River (Oregon)

=== Roads ===
- Sprague Avenue (Spokane, Washington) a main arterial road in Spokane and Spokane Valley, Washington

== People ==
=== First name ===
- Sprague Cleghorn, former NHL hockey player
- Sprague Grayden, American actress (born 1980)

=== Middle name ===
- L. Sprague de Camp, author

=== Surname ===
- Sprague (surname)

== Other uses ==
- Sprague (towboat), a former steamwheeler towboat
- Howard Sprague, a fictional character in the television series The Andy Griffith Show and Mayberry R.F.D.
- Ted Sprague, a fictional character in the television series Heroes
- Sprague Electric, an electronic component maker, best known for making capacitors, acquired in 1992 by Vishay Intertechnology

== See also ==
- Spragg (disambiguation)
- Spragge (disambiguation)
