= Charles Sprague =

Charles Sprague may refer to:

- Charles Sprague (poet) (1791–1875), American poet
- Charles James Sprague (1823–1903), American botanist
- Charles Sprague Smith (1853–1910), activist and founder of the People's Institute during the Progressive era
- Charles A. Sprague (1887–1969), Governor of Oregon, 1939–1943
- Charles Ezra Sprague (1842–1912), American accountant
- Charles F. Sprague (1857–1902), U.S. Representative from Massachusetts
- Charlie Sprague (1864–1912), American baseball player
