= William Sprague =

William Sprague may refer to:

- William Sprague (1609–1675), original American settler
- William Buell Sprague (1795–1876), American clergyman and compiler of Annals of the American Pulpit
- William Sprague III (1799–1856), American politician from Rhode Island, uncle of William Sprague IV
- William Sprague (Michigan politician) (1809–1868), politician from Michigan
- William P. Sprague (1827–1899), politician from Ohio
- William Sprague IV (1830–1915), politician from Rhode Island, nephew of William Sprague III
- William George Robert Sprague (1863–1933), London theatre designer
- William C. Sprague (1860–1922), founder of The American Boy magazine

== See also ==
- Sprague (surname)
