= Fred Ball =

American movie studio executive (1915–2007)

- Ball in 1956
- Born: Frederick Henry Ball; July 17, 1915; Jamestown, New York, U.S.
- Died: February 5, 2007 (aged 91); Cottonwood, Arizona, U.S.
- Occupations: Movie studio executive; talent manager
- Years active: 1978–2000
- Spouse: Zo Ball
- Children: 4
- Relatives: Lucille Ball (sister); Lucie Arnaz (niece); Desi Arnaz Jr. (nephew); Suzan Ball (cousin)

Frederick Henry Ball (July 17, 1915 – February 5, 2007) was an American movie studio executive and younger brother of Lucille Ball.

== Early life ==
Ball was born on July 17, 1915, to Henry Durrell Ball (1887–1915) and Désirée "Dede" Evelyn Hunt (1892–1977) in Jamestown, New York. He was named after his grandfather. He grew up in a Baptist family; his father was of English and Scottish descent. His mother was of French, Irish and English descent. His genealogy can be traced back to the earliest settlers in the colonies, including Edmund Rice, a founder of Sudbury, Massachusetts. Another direct ancestor, William Sprague, left England on the ship Lyon's Whelp for Plymouth/Salem, Massachusetts.

His father was a telephone lineman for the Bell Telephone Company, and his mother was a concert pianist. His father contracted typhoid fever while DeDe Ball was pregnant with Fred, and died in February 1915. In 1918, his mother married a Swedish Lutheran salesman named Edward (Ed) Peterson.

Fred and his sister were raised by their grandparents. Their grandfather, Fred Hunt, was an eccentric socialist who enjoyed the theater and frequently took the family to vaudeville shows. He worked in the furniture industry. He often whittled toys and made doll furniture for his grandchildren. Fred thought of Mr. Hunt as his father (since his own father died before he was born); it was his grandfather who became a surrogate father to him through most of his childhood. Fred, Lucille, and their mother all lived together with the Hunts for a time in Celoron.

In 1927, a neighborhood child, Warner Erikson, was paralyzed by a shot accidentally fired from a gun Fred's grandfather had given him for his birthday. Erikson died five years later. The resultant publicity and lawsuit forced Mr. Hunt to sell his house and enter bankruptcy. He was even jailed for a time. After this incident (which was referred to in the family as "the break-up"), the family had to split up. Fred's grandfather died in 1944.

== Career ==
He left Jamestown, along with his mother and grandfather, to join his sister in California in the 1930s, working as a page boy at Cafe Trocadero. He was the road manager for Desi Arnaz's band in the 1940s and 1950s. Later, he was on the Board of Directors of Desilu Productions (the studio that Desi and Lucy purchased in 1951 and that produced I Love Lucy, as well as Star Trek, Mission: Impossible, and The Untouchables).

After managing administration at Desilu Productions, he instead managed restaurants and hotels, such as the Palm Desert Hotel, and mobile-home parks. He was a real estate agent and broker in Arizona.

== Death ==
Fred Ball died of natural causes in Cottonwood, Arizona, on February 5, 2007, at the age of 91. He was cremated and buried in the Hunt family plot at Lake View Cemetery in Jamestown, New York, where his parents, Henry and Desirée (Hunt) Ball, his sister, Lucille Ball, and his grandparents are buried. He was survived by his four children, Pamela Ball Von Pinnon, Melissa LeBritton, April Jackson, and Geoffrey Ball, as well as seven grandchildren and great-grandchildren. Fred's wife, Zo Ball, died on May 12, 2013, at the age of 93.
