= Nathan Sprague =

Nathan Sprague may refer to:

- Nathan B. Sprague (1787–1864), Rhode Island farmer and politician
- Nathan Turner Sprague (1828–1903), businessman, banker and Vermont state legislator
