= Senator Sprague =

Senator Sprague may refer to:

== Members of the United States Senate ==
- Peleg Sprague (Maine politician) (1793–1880), U.S. Senator from Maine from 1829 to 1835
- William Sprague III (1799–1856), U.S. Senator from Rhode Island from 1842 to 1844
- William Sprague IV (1830–1915), U.S. Senator from Rhode Island from 1863 to 1875

== United States state senate members ==
- Charles F. Sprague (1857–1902), Massachusetts State Senate
- E. Carleton Sprague (1822–1895), New York State Senate
- Frederick Sprague (fl. 1840s–1850s), Wisconsin State Senate
- Henry H. Sprague (1841–1920), Massachusetts State Senate
- Jo Ann Sprague (born 1931), Massachusetts State Senate
- Nathan Turner Sprague (1828–1903), Vermont State Senate
- Royal Sprague (1814–1872), California State Senate
- William P. Sprague (1827–1899), Ohio State Senate
