= William Houghton Sprague Pearce =

American painter (1864–1935)

- Born: August 5, 1864; Boston, Massachusetts, U.S.
- Died: April 15, 1935 (aged 70); Boston, Massachusetts, U.S.
- Occupation: Painter
- Spouse: Miriam Badlam (m. 1889)
- Children: 4
- Relatives: Charles Sprague Pearce (brother); Charles Sprague (grandfather)

William Houghton Sprague Pearce (August 5, 1864 – April 15, 1935) was an American artist.

== Early life ==
William Houghton Sprague Pearce was born on August 5, 1864, in Boston to Mary Anna (née Sprague) and Shadrach Houghton Pearce. His grandfather was poet Charles Sprague. His great-grandfather, Samuel Sprague, was a Patriot of the Revolutionary period and a participant in the Boston Tea Party who served under George Washington. He also is descended from Richard Warren, a Mayflower passenger and signer of the Mayflower Compact and reverend Peter Hobart of Hingham. He graduated from The English High School in Boston in 1882. His father ran a successful Chinese importing business. He was descended from many of Massachusetts's founding and historical figures. In a letter of recommendation from the headmaster he is described as "a young man of unexceptionable moral character and a very good scholar" whom he could "confidently recommend as one who, in everything and under all circumstances, will do his best for his employer".

== Career ==
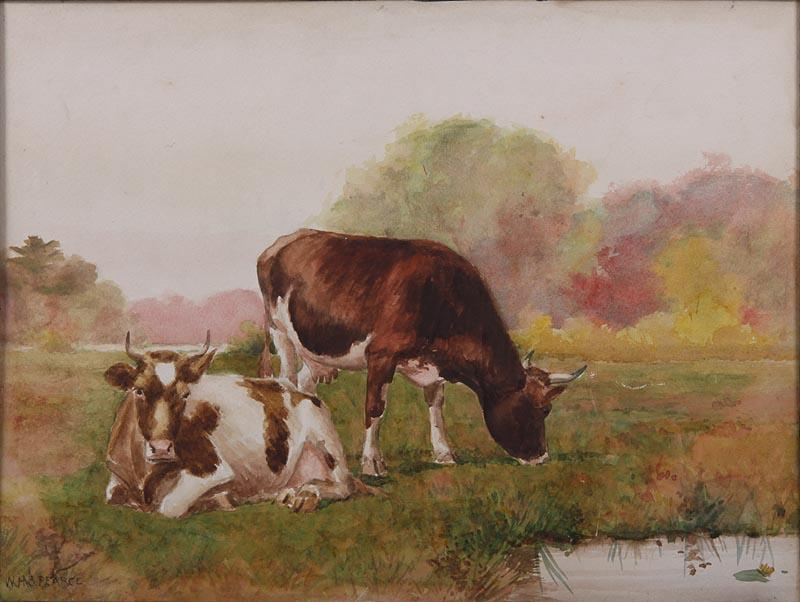
Cattle in a Field painting by Pearce

Following high school graduation, Pearce worked for the New England Life Insurance Company. He worked there the remainder of his life.

Pearce was a painter and photographer. His work was displayed at the Boston Art Museum and at the Copley Society of Art. His older brother was the expatriate painter Charles Sprague Pearce. Charles moved to Paris in 1873 at the age of 22 to study in the atelier of Leon Bonnet and pursue a career as a painter. Although separated by an ocean the two brothers remained close through a series of four decades of letters and several personal visits. Will often sent his older brother photographs of his work asking him for advice and criticism. These letters exchanged thoughts and ideas, painting techniques of composition, values, lighting, painting styles and pricing until the death of Charles in France in 1914.

William grew up in an artistic and cultured family that encouraged his interests in literature, art and music and he pursued them his entire life. He enjoyed the newly developing art form of photography and played both the violin and cello. He was employed by the New England Mutual Life Insurance Company which provided him a steady income and the opportunity to support his family while continuing to paint. Many of his paintings hung in the New England Mutual Life Insurance building, and they were often used for the banks yearly calendars (1891, 1899, 1901). His works were exhibited and he sold a good amount of his work. He had a talent with music, limericks and stories and wrote under the pseudonym of Carol Vox. A series of whimsical children's books and the Sphinx and the Mummy. a book of limericks, were illustrated by his longtime friend, the well known illustrator and painter, H. Boylston Dummer.

He spent many summers at a large family country residence in Walpole, Massachusetts painting the scenic vistas. He is also known to have painted in Rockport, Massachusetts with his friends, Lester Stevens and Marshall Johnson, Provincetown, the Berkshires and the Lynn marshes. Although best known for his landscapes he did some portrait work of his wife and daughter, Miriam. A favorite and recurring theme of Williams was cows, a subject he studied and he studied and painted at great length. His grand daughter remembers him keeping a stuffed cow's head in his studio in Newton that he used as a model and also of him using a mirror to look at his subjects instead of looking at them directly. Every evening he would go to the back yard where he had a platform and paint a sunset.

== Personal life ==
Pearce married Miriam Badlam, daughter of William H. Badlam on June 5, 1889, at St. Mary's Episcopal Church in Dorchester. They had three sons and a daughter, Charles, Harold G., William and Miriam.

Pearce died on April 16, 1935, aged 70, at Peter Bent Brigham Hospital in Boston. He was buried in Cedar Grove Cemetery in Dorchester.
