= Sprague family =

American business and political family

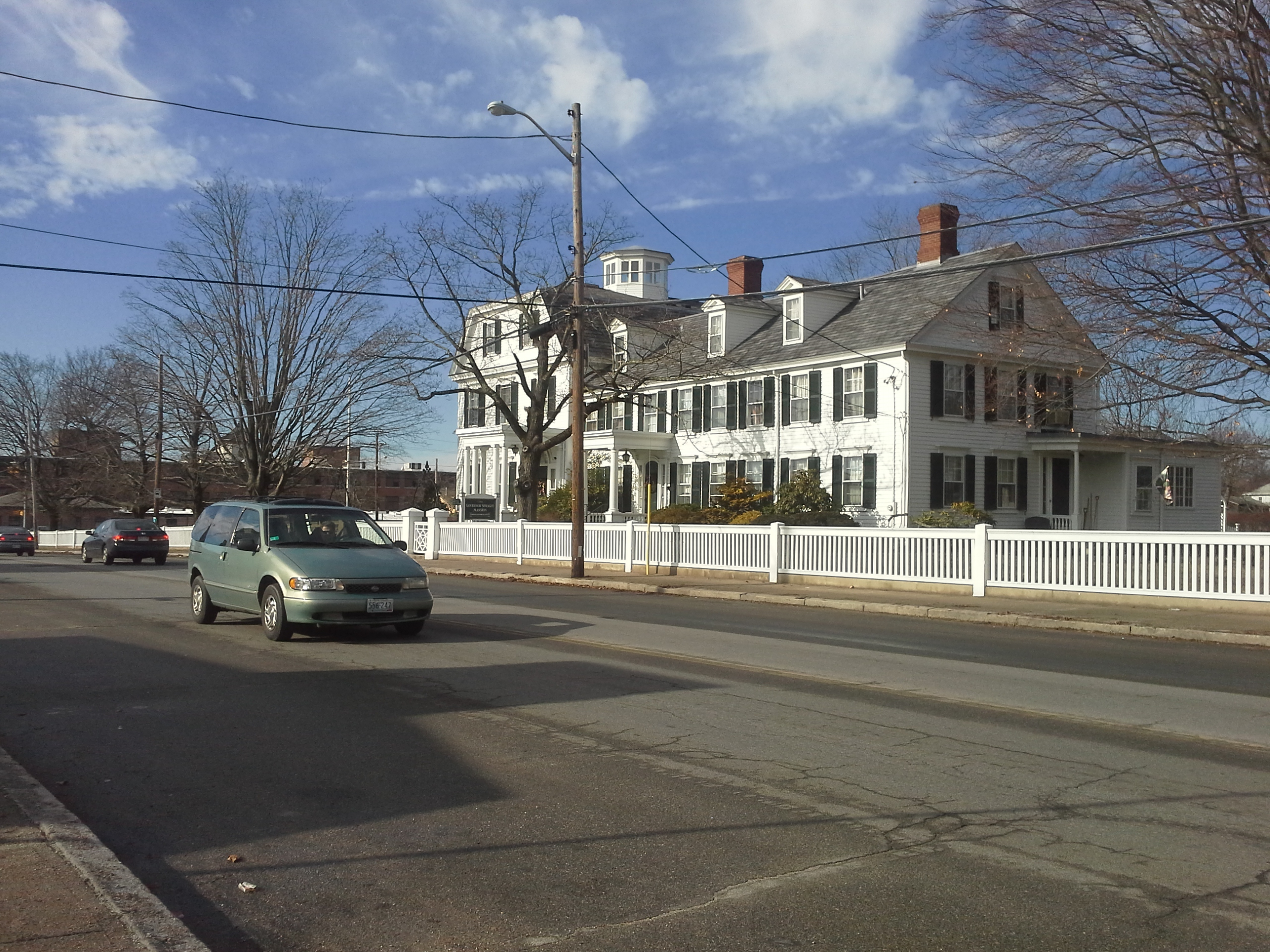
The Governor William Sprague Mansion, a U.S. historical place, in 2013

The Sprague family is an American Pilgrim, business, political, and society family.

== History ==
Francis Sprague and his daughters Anne Sprague and Mercy Sprague were the first members of the Sprague family to arrive in America. They arrived at Plymouth Colony in 1623 on the Good Ship Anne. Francis became a prominent member of the colony. In the 1623 Plymouth Colony land division, as a passenger on the Anne, Francis received three acres "to the sea eastward." He was listed as one of the "Purchasers", a group of 53 Plymouth Colony planters, together with five London men who, in about 1626, acquired the interests of the "Adventurers" (the original investors in the colony). In 1986, Eugene Aubrey Stratton wrote, "the list of Purchasers continued to be an important one for, in general, these people were privileged above others in future land grants in the colony." Francis Sprague was listed in the 1627 cattle division with Anna Sprague and Mercye Sprague in the 6th company of John Shaw, which included thirteen people. In July of that same year, he signed an agreement with Governor Bradford and others regarding the carrying on of the fur trade.

Francis settled in Duxbury, Massachusetts, in 1624 upon its founding by Miles Standish and John Alden. He is thought to have settled in an area called "the Nook".

Francis' branch of the family later obtained great wealth in the 18th century through shipbuilding.

In 1629, six years after Francis' arrival, Ralph, Richard, and William Sprague emigrated from Upwey, Dorset, England, to Naumkeag (present-day Salem, Massachusetts. It is not known whether Francis Sprague was related to Ralph, Richard, and William. The three Sprague brothers initially settled in Salem, Massachusetts. Later, in 1629, they became the founders of Charlestown (now part of Boston) after receiving permission from Governor John Endicott to explore and settle the area. They are also credited with founding Malden and Hingham, Massachusetts.

The Sprague family arrived in Rhode Island in 1709 after William's son, also named William, purchased a house in Providence. In the early 1800s, William Sprague II founded a successful textile business in Cranston, Rhode Island. During the early 1870s, the output of the Sprague family's nine mills was greater than all of the other mills in the United States combined, and their profits were around $20 million annually. Due to bad investments and careless speculation, the company fell into receivership following the Panic of 1873. By 1875, almost all of the Spragues' assets had been sold. Two of Ralph, Richard, and William's descendants (William Sprague III and William Sprague IV) held the offices of Governor of Rhode Island and United States Senator.

The two separate Sprague family trees converged with the marriage of Peleg Sprague, great-grandson of William Sprague, and Mercy Chandler, great-great granddaughter of Francis Sprague in 1746.

Descendants of all six of the original Spragues in America—Anne, Francis, Mercy, Ralph, Richard, and William—have been prominent in American business and politics, particularly in Maine, Massachusetts, New York, and Rhode Island.

In 1873, the New York Times published an article titled "History of the Sprague Family", which begins,

"When we remember that two families of Sprague, unacquainted and in no way related, were represented in the earliest days of the New-England colonies—Francis Sprague, who arrived at Plymouth in the ship Anne, in July, 1623, and Ralph, Richard, and William Spragues three young men, sons of Edward Sprague, of Upway, Dorsetshire, England, who went to Salem, Mass., in 1629—it is not surprising that the two families, from a fusion of which the Spragues, of Providence, are descended should have so marked a place in the history of New England."

The Spragues intermarried with other prominent early American families including the Hoyts, the Francklyns, the Morgans, the Pratts, the Sargents, the Vanderbilts, the Welds, and the Woodworths. With her husband, Susan Sprague Hoyt was included on Caroline Schermerhorn Astor's list of "The 400" as, Mr. and Mrs. C. G. Francklyn. Mary Sprague (1728-1781) was the grandmother of Cornelius Vanderbilt, nicknamed, The Commodore." Also Ellen Sprague Stager (1865-1951), daughter of Western Union founder Anson Stager and his wife Rebecca Sprague, became Marchioness of Ormonde through her marriage to Lord Arthur Butler, younger son of the 2nd Marquess of Ormonde of Kilkenny Castle, Ireland. Charles Franklin Sprague married Mary Bryant Pratt, granddaughter of 19th-century shipping magnate William F. Weld, in 1891. Frederick Douglass' daughter Rosetta Douglass (1839-1906) married Nathan Hawkins Sprague (1841-1907). Kate Chase Sprague, daughter of Abraham Lincoln's treasury secretary and later Chief Justice of the United States Salmon P. Chase married Rhode Island governor and US senator William Sprague.

Buildings at Yale University and Harvey Mudd College are named after members of the Sprague family, as are buildings in Duxbury, Massachusetts, Rochester, Michigan, Salt Lake City, Utah, and Cranston and Warwick, Rhode Island. At least seven of Duxbury's historical buildings bear the Sprague name, reflecting the Spragues' extensive presence in the town from the 1600s through the 1800s. Their architectural legacy is among the most significant of any family in the town's history, rivaled only by the legacy of the Alden family. Sprague buildings in Duxbury include homes, commercial buildings, and maritime structures, reflecting the family's diverse economic activities in the community from the 1620s through the 18th, 19th, and 20th centuries. The Massachusetts Museum of Contemporary Art (MASS MoCA) occupies the former complex of Sprague Electric in North Adams, Massachusetts.

== Notable members ==
- Francis Sprague (about 1690-before 1680) and [likely] his daughters Anne and Mercy Sprague; the first Spragues to settle in America
- William Sprague (1609–1675) and his brothers Ralph and Richard; arrived in the Plymouth Colony in 1629, six years after Francis Sprague arrived, and settled in Charlestown, according to Memorial of the Sprague Family
- Jonathan Sprague (1648–1741), member of the Rhode Island General Assembly from 1695 to 1696, 1699–1700, 1702–1710, 1712, and 1714
- William Sprague II (1773–1836), founder of the Spragues' milling business
- Samuel Sprague (1753–1844), participant in the Boston Tea Party
- Horatio Sprague (1784-1848), U.S. Consul to Gibraltar
- Charles Sprague (1791–1875), poet
- Peleg Sprague (1793–1880), judge of the United States District Court for the District of Massachusetts, U.S. senator from Maine, and member of the U.S. House of Representatives from Maine's 4th district
- Amasa Sprague (1798–1843), senior partner of A & W Sprague and murder victim
- William Sprague III (1799–1856), partner of A & W Sprague, governor of Rhode Island and U.S. senator
- Isaac Sprague (1811–1895), botanical illustrator
- John W. Sprague (1817–1893), soldier and railroad executive
- Charles James Sprague (1823–1903), botanist
- William P. Sprague (1827–1899), two-term U.S. representative from Ohio
- Amasa Sprague Jr. (1828–1902), partner of A & W Sprague and founder of Narragansett Park
- William Sprague IV (1830–1915), partner of A & W Sprague, governor of Rhode Island and U.S. senator
- Charles Sprague Sargent (1841-1927), first director of Harvard University's Arnold Arboretum in Boston
- Charles F. Sprague (1857-1902), member of the Boston Common Council in 1889 and 1890, 1891 and 1892 Massachusetts state representative, 1893 and 1894 Boston board of park commissioners chair, 1895 and 1896 Massachusetts state senator, house representative to the fifty-fifth and fifty-sixth U.S. congresses
- Frank J. Sprague (1857-1934), inventor, entrepreneur, electric motor engineer
- Oliver Mitchell Wentworth Sprague (1873-1953), money and banking expert and economics faculty member at Harvard University and Harvard Business School
- Ernest L. Sprague (1876–1944), Secretary of State of Rhode Island
- Charles A. Sprague (November 12, 1887 – March 13, 1969)
- Robert C. Sprague (1900-1991), electrical engineer, founder of Sprague Electric, son of Frank J.
