= Spragge =

Spragge is a surname, and may refer to:

- Edward Spragge (c.1620–1673), admiral in the Royal Navy
- John Godfrey Spragge (1806–1884), Canadian lawyer and judge
- Shirley Spragge (1929–1995), Canadian archivist and academic

== See also ==
- Spragge, Ontario, Canada, a village now part of The North Shore township
- HMS Spragge, the name of several ships of the Royal Navy
- Spragg
- Sprague (surname)
