= The English High School =

Public high school in Boston, Massachusetts

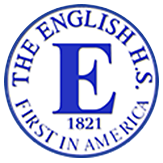

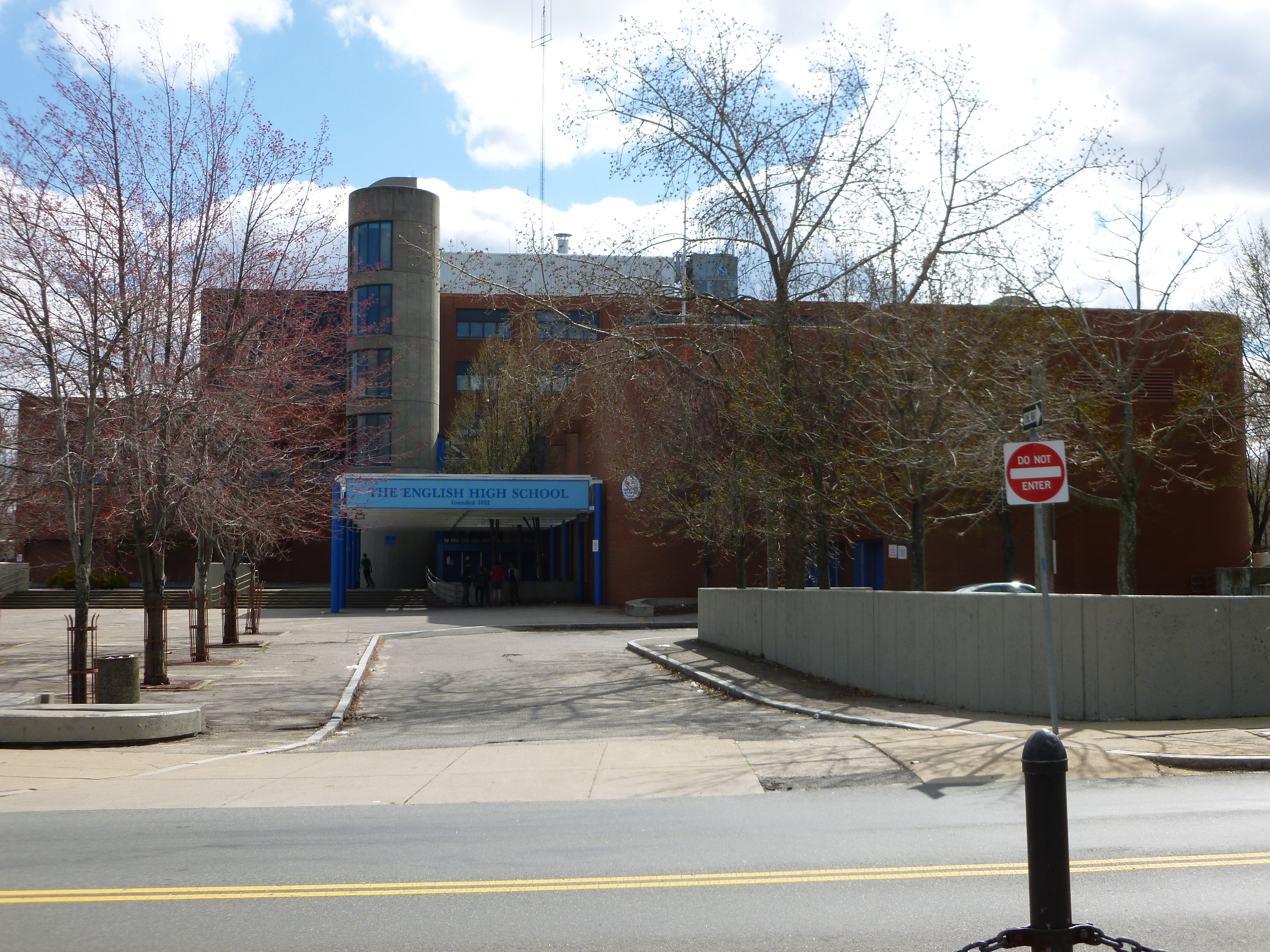
- The English High School in 2011

Location
- 144 McBride Street; Jamaica Plain, Massachusetts 02130; United States; 42.3063°N 71.1094°W

Information
- School type: Public high school
- Established: 1821; 205 years ago
- School district: Boston Public Schools
- NCES School ID: 250279000327
- Headmaster: Caitlin Murphy
- Teaching staff: 62.15 (FTE)
- Grades: 9–12
- Enrollment: 682 (2023–2024)
- Student to teacher ratio: 10.97
- Colors: Columbia blue Navy blue
- Athletics conference: Boston City League
- Mascot: English Eagle
- Nickname: Blue & Blue
- Rival: Boston Latin School
- Newspaper: The English High School Record
- Information: (617) 282-2424
- Website: englishhs.org

The English High School in Boston, Massachusetts, founded in 1821, is one of the first public high schools in the United States. Originally called The English Classical School, it was renamed upon its first relocation in 1824. Commonly referred to as Boston English, the school is located in the Jamaica Plain neighborhood of Boston and is a part of Boston Public Schools (BPS).

== History ==
Boston English was created at the urging of the Massachusetts Charitable Mechanics Association and was modeled after the Royal High School in Edinburgh, Scotland. The School Committee to establish English High School was chaired by Samuel Adams Wells, grandson of former Governor Samuel Adams. Its first headmaster was George B. Emerson, an early leader in educational reform. English, like Boston Latin School, only admitted boys when established—although a separate high school for girls was established in Boston by Emerson three years later in 1824. Boston English ended its policy of single sex education and admitted girls to become coeducational in 1972, 151 years after its founding.

Boston English has had seven different geographic locations / buildings. Its first site was on Derne Street at the rear of the Massachusetts State House and is marked by a metal historical commemorative plaque. Its second home was a building, which is still standing at the corner of Pinkney and Anderson Streets, which eventually became the Phillips School, a school for then free born and emancipated African-Americans before the American Civil War. From 1844 to 1922, Boston English's building was adjacent and matching on the other side to the structure for the Boston Latin School, first near downtown Boston and then, starting in 1881, in a building (now demolished) on Warren Street in the South End. From 1954 to 1961, Boston English was then at 77 Avenue Louis Pasteur, across the street from the Boston Latin at 78 Avenue Louis Pasteur. This site is now part of Harvard University Medical School.

The motto of the school has been: "The aim of every English High School boy is to become a man of honor and achievement." The current motto of the school is "Honor, Achievement, Service to Mankind".

== Curriculum ==
English High was created originally to educate working-class schoolboys in preparation for business, mechanics, and engineering trades as opposed to "Latin-grammar" schools like Boston Latin that prepared schoolboys for the college, ministry and scholarly pursuits, and private academies that were open only to affluent residents. Its original curriculum consisted of such courses as English, surveying, navigation, geography, logic, and civics as well as a strong emphasis on mathematics.

Nowadays, English High has opened up its curriculum to include more liberal arts subjects such as foreign languages and writing as well as performing arts and more college preparatory courses. It has received an experimental "Commonwealth Co-Pilot School" status, geared toward improving the curriculum of urban schools. For a while, the school had an award-winning mock trial team as well.

English High School has an English-Language Learners program

== Extracurricular activities ==
=== Athletics ===
Each Thanksgiving since 1887, English has played Boston Latin School in football in the oldest continuing high school rivalry in the United States. It is also the fourth longest U.S. high school rivalry of all time. In the 1993 football season, the football team made history by being the first team in school history to ever qualify for the Massachusetts State Championship. The Bulldogs (or Blue & Blue) defeated the Nantucket Whalers by the score of 16–7 to claim its school's first state championship. The '97 football team was the first team to go undefeated with a 12–0 record and English's second football state championship. English High also has competitive basketball, softball, volleyball, and track teams. Up until the 1980s, the school had a boys' hockey team, a golf team, and swimming teams for both boys and girls.

== Notable alumni ==
- Gennaro Angiulo, 1936, Italian-American mob boss and the boss of the Boston branch of Patriarca crime family
- Bruce Bolling – first black president of the Boston City Council
- Benjamin A. Botkin – folklorist
- Robert A. Brooks – 1949, telecommunications pioneer
- Percy Jewett Burrell – dramatist and playwright
- Tonya Cardoza - basketball coach
- Herb Chambers – automotive dealer
- Bill Chase - jazz/rock trumpet player and bandleader
- Ken Clarke – former NFL defensive tackle
- George W. Coleman – publisher
- Jerry Colonna – trombonist, actor, comedian, singer and songwriter
- Allan Crite – painter
- William Healey Dall – malacologist and explorer of Alaska
- Louis Farrakhan, minister
- Maxwell Finland, physician and infectious diseases expert
- Kahlil Gibran – artist
- Frank Bunker Gilbreth – time and motion engineer
- Howard Gould – actor
- Bobby Guindon – former MLB player (Boston Red Sox)
- Paul X. Kelley – Commandant of United States Marine Corps, 1983–1987
- Jordan Knight – singer
- Samuel Pierpont Langley – director of the Smithsonian Institution
- Kendra Lara – Former Boston City Counselor.
- Charles W. Lyons – Jesuit and president of several universities
- Bill Meanix – hurdler
- Theophilus E. McKinney, Jr – professor and university administrator
- J. P. Morgan – financier
- Leonard Nimoy – actor
- Bill Owens – American politician, businessman, and the first Black state senator in the Massachusetts State Senate.
- William Houghton Sprague Pearce – painter
- Matthew Ridgway – general
- Mickey Roach – NHL player (Hamilton Tigers)
- Louis Sullivan – architect
- Michael J. Sullivan – professional baseball player and politician
- Vito Tamulis – MLB player (New York Yankees, St. Louis Browns, Brooklyn Dodgers, Philadelphia Phillies)
- Timothy Francis Walsh – architect and partner of Maginnis & Walsh
- William H.C. Whiting – Confederate general

== Image gallery ==
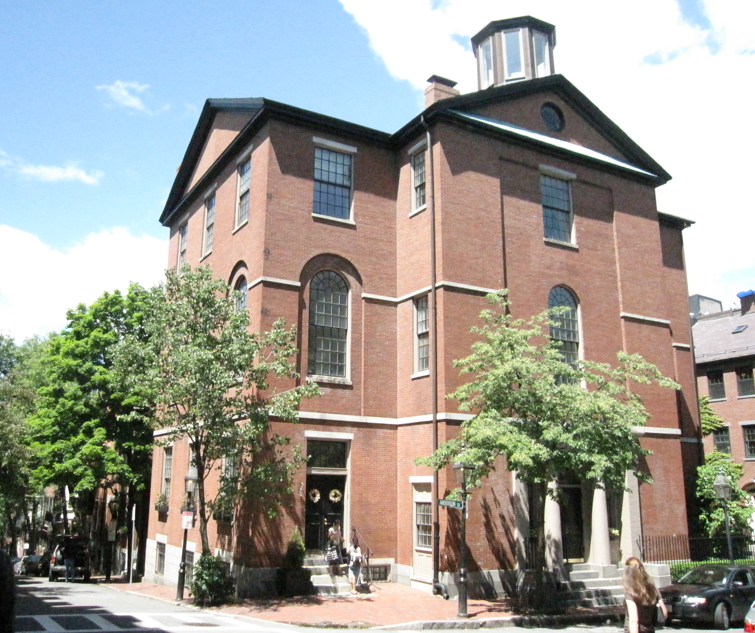
Former building of English High School, Pinckney St., Boston (photo 2010)

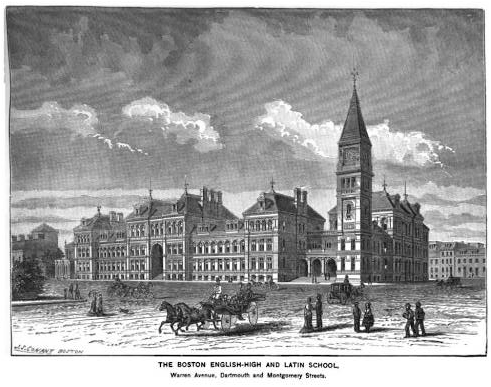
English and Latin Schools, Boston, ca.1881

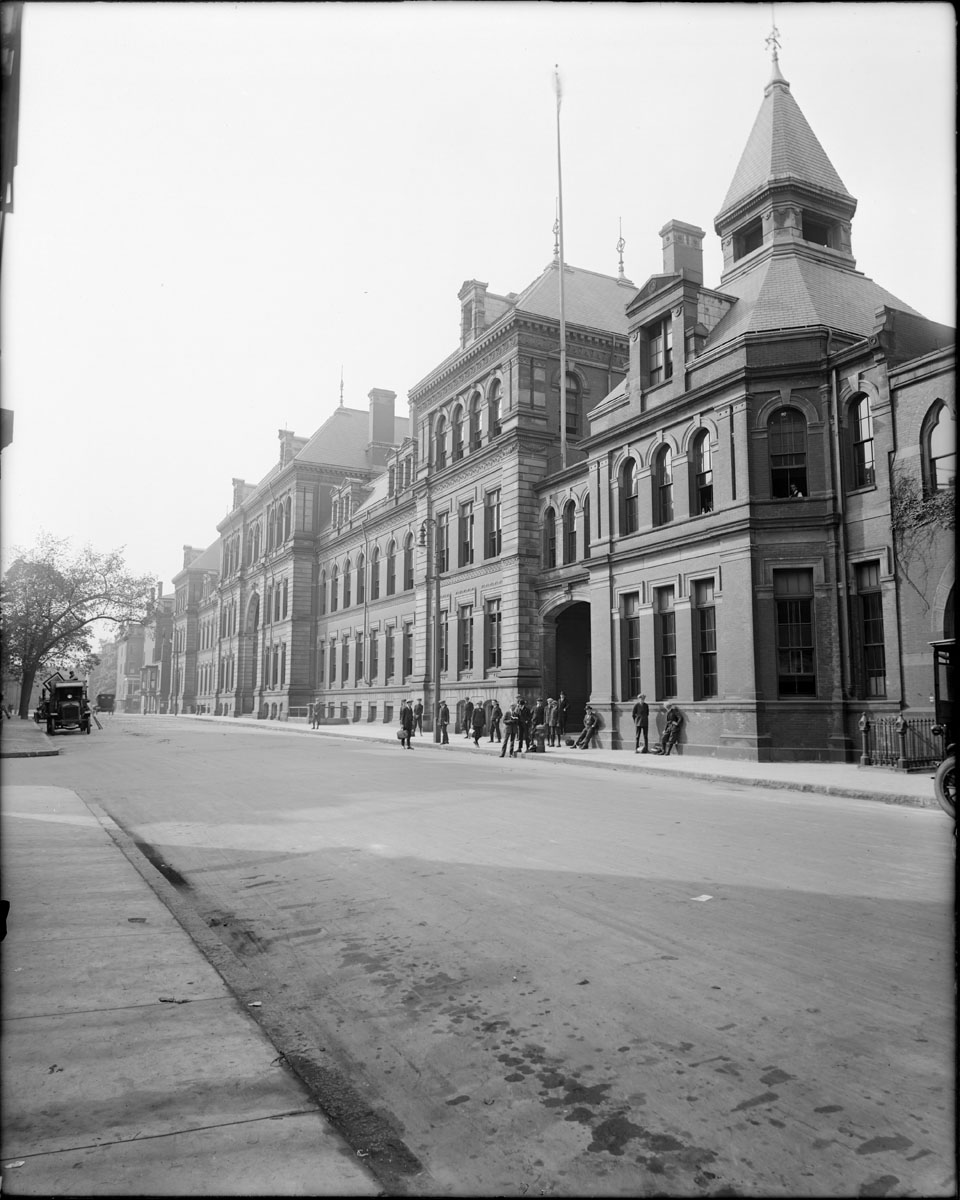
English High School, 1920

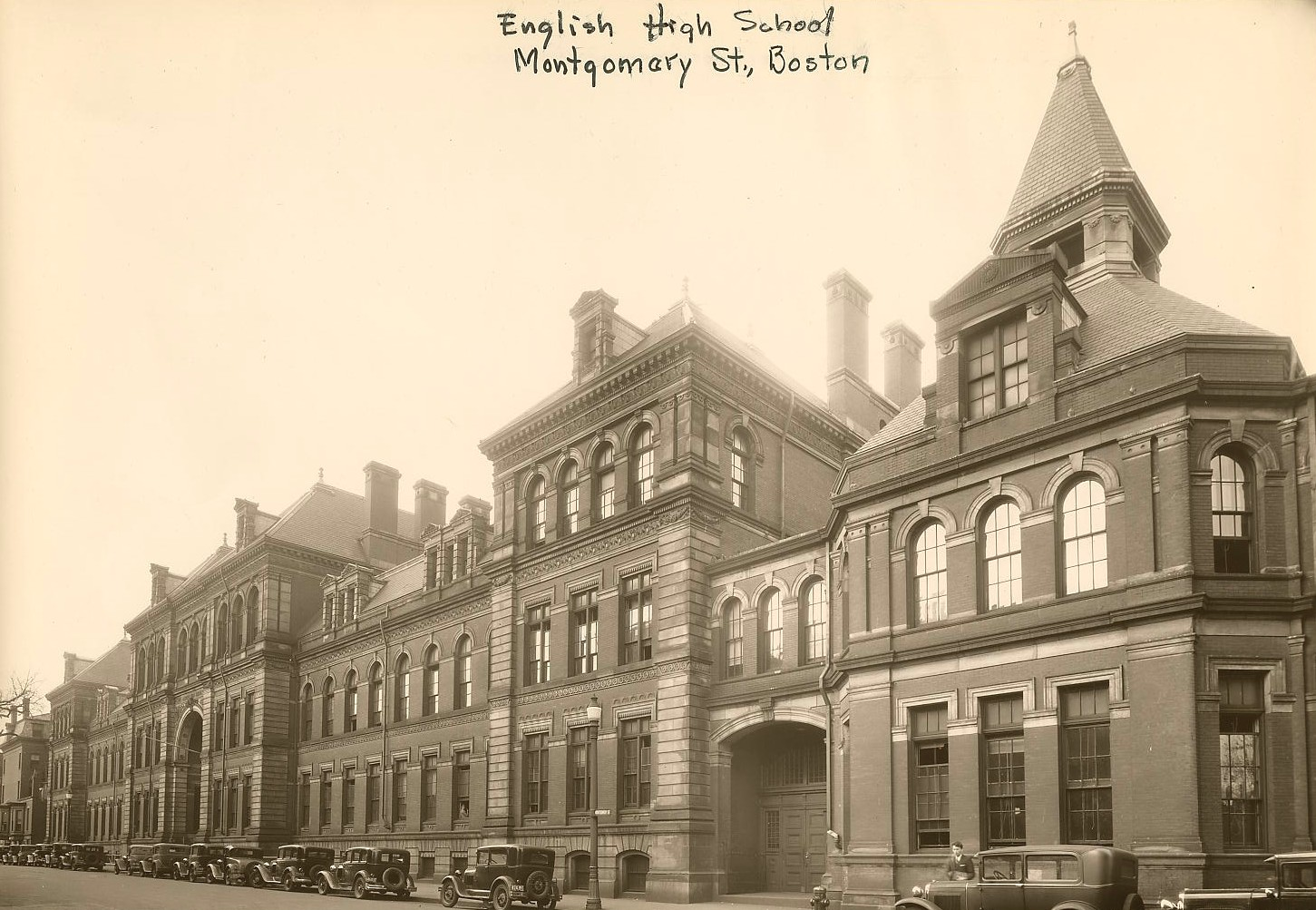
English High School on Montgomery St., the 1920s (?)
