= Central Burying Ground =

Cemetery in Boston, Massachusetts, US

Coordinates: 42.35276°N 71.06597°W

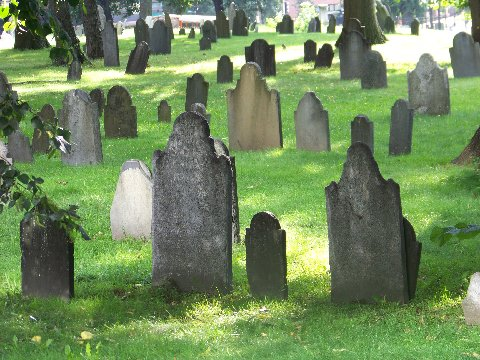
- Central Burying Ground, Boston Common, 2008
- Interactive map of Central Burying Ground

Details
- Established: 1756
- Location: Boylston Street, Boston Common, Boston, Massachusetts, U.S.

The Central Burying Ground is a cemetery in Boston, Massachusetts, United States. It was established on Boston Common in 1756. It is located on Boylston Street between Tremont Street and Charles Street.

Famous burials there include the artist Gilbert Stuart, painter of the famed portraits of George Washington and Martha Washington, and the composer William Billings, who wrote the famous colonial hymn "Chester." Also buried there are Samuel Sprague and his son, Charles Sprague, one of America's earliest poets. Samuel Sprague was a participant in the Boston Tea Party and fought in the American Revolutionary War.

When the Tremont Street subway was under construction in the 1890s, burials were discovered in the area abutting the cemetery. These were reinterred in a mass grave within the bounds of the burying ground.

== Notable burials ==
- "British soldiers who died of disease during the occupation of the city [1775–1776], and those who died of wounds received at Bunker Hill"
- William Billings (1746–1800), composer
- Caleb Davis (1738–1797)
- Stephen Higginson (1743–1828), American politician and merchant
- John Baptiste Julien (d.1805), proprietor of Julien's Restorator
- Gilbert Stuart (1755–1828)
- Charles Sprague (1791–1875)

== See also ==
- Funerary art in Puritan New England
- List of cemeteries in Boston, Massachusetts

== Image gallery ==
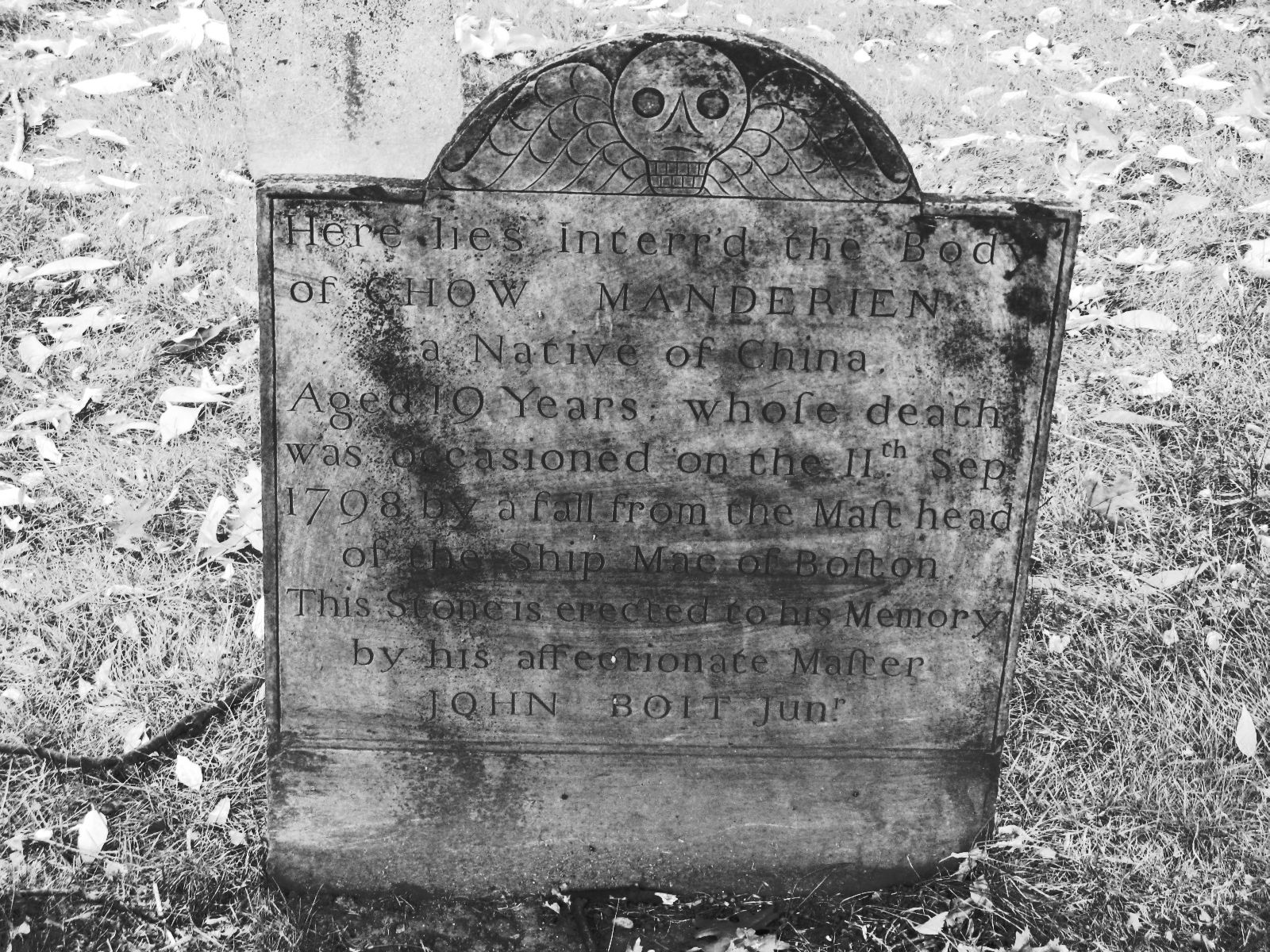
Marker of Chow Manderien, died 1798 (photo from 2008)

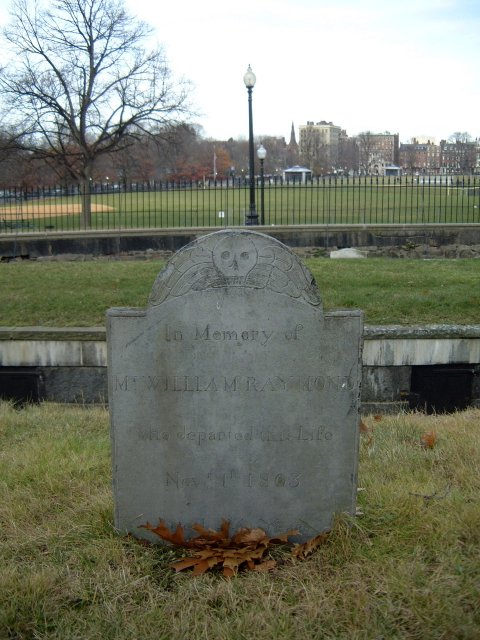
Marker of William Raymond (2004 photo)

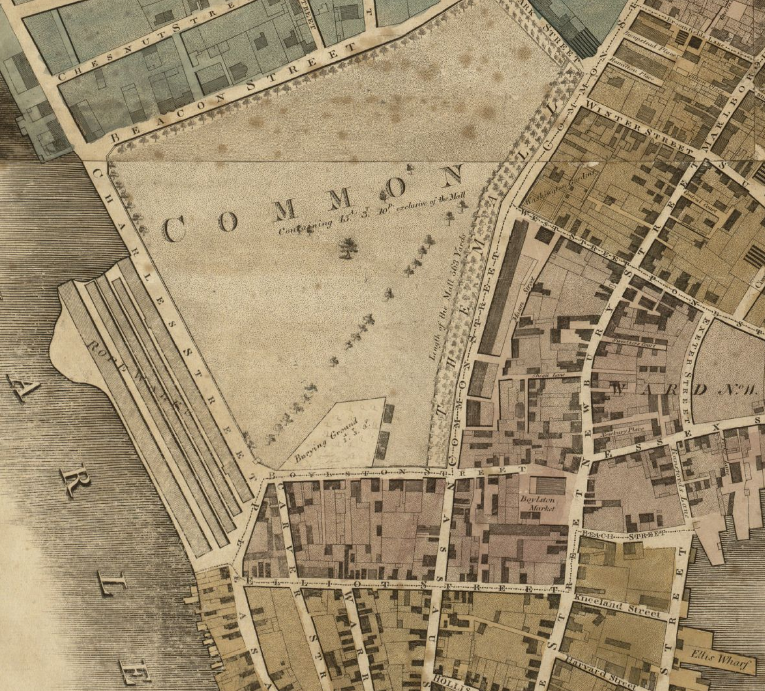
Detail of 1814 map of Boston, showing Central Burying Ground

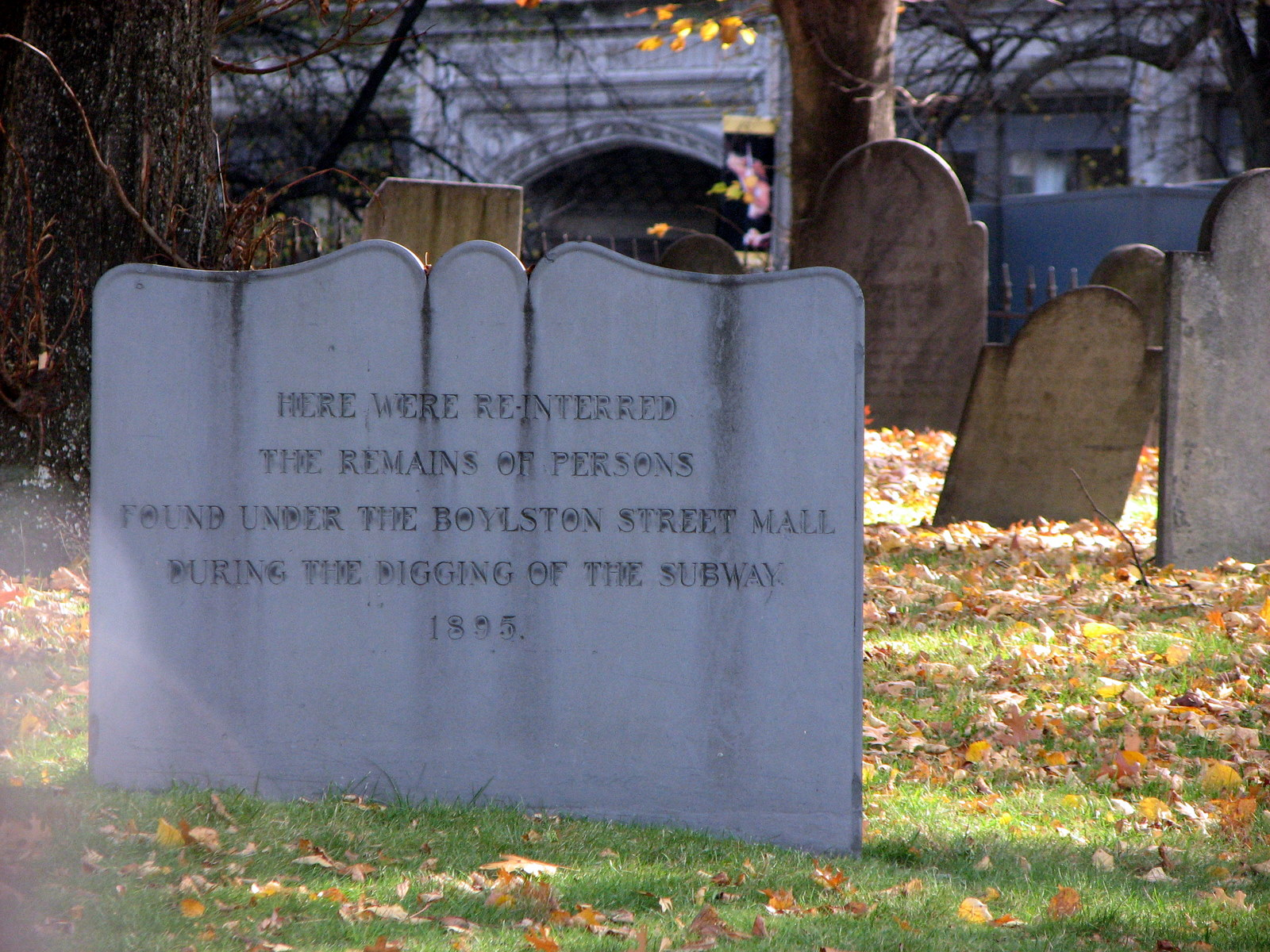
"Here were interred the remains of persons found under the Boylston St. Mall during the digging of the subway, 1895" (photo from 2008)

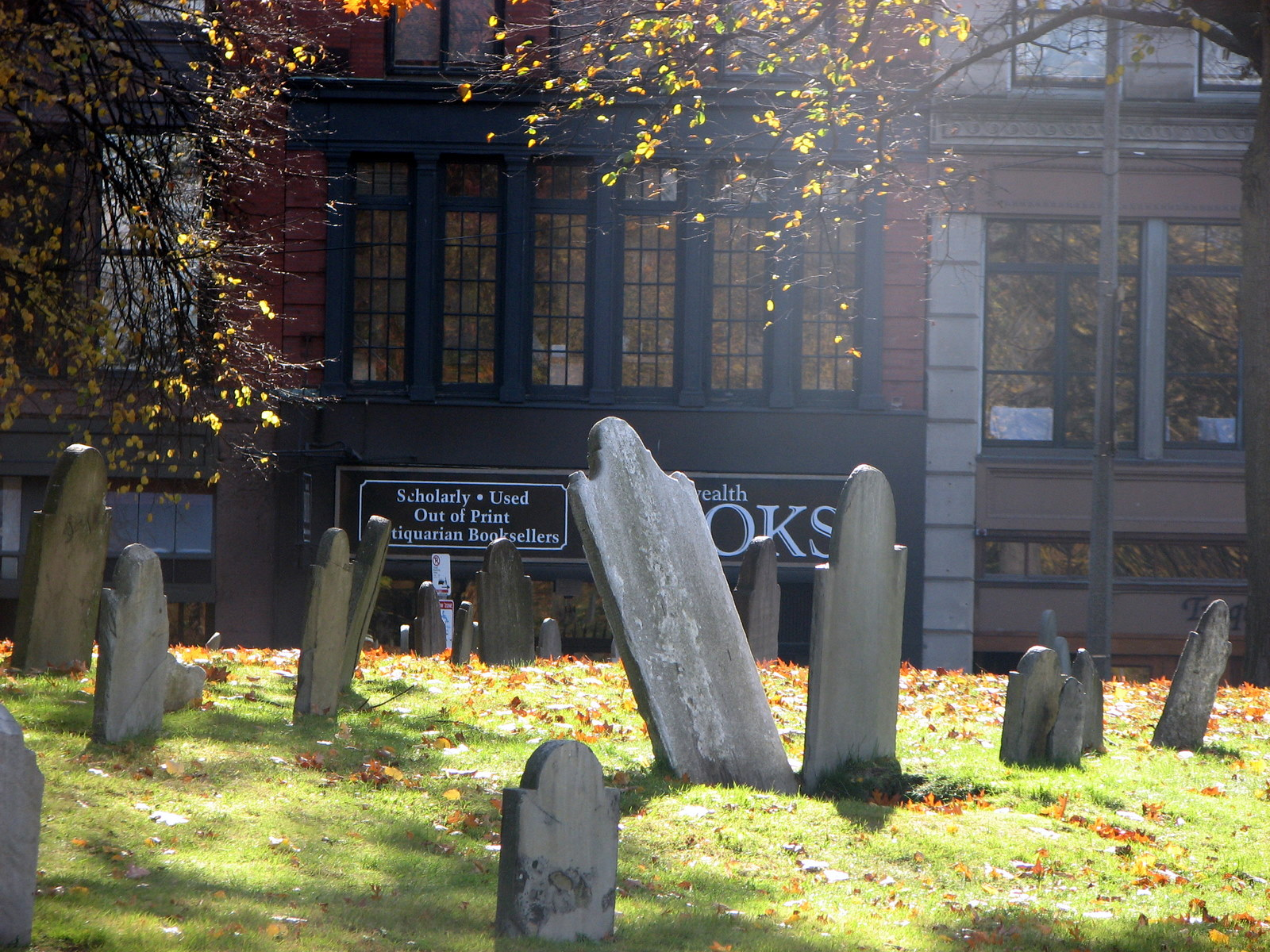
View of Boylston St., 2008

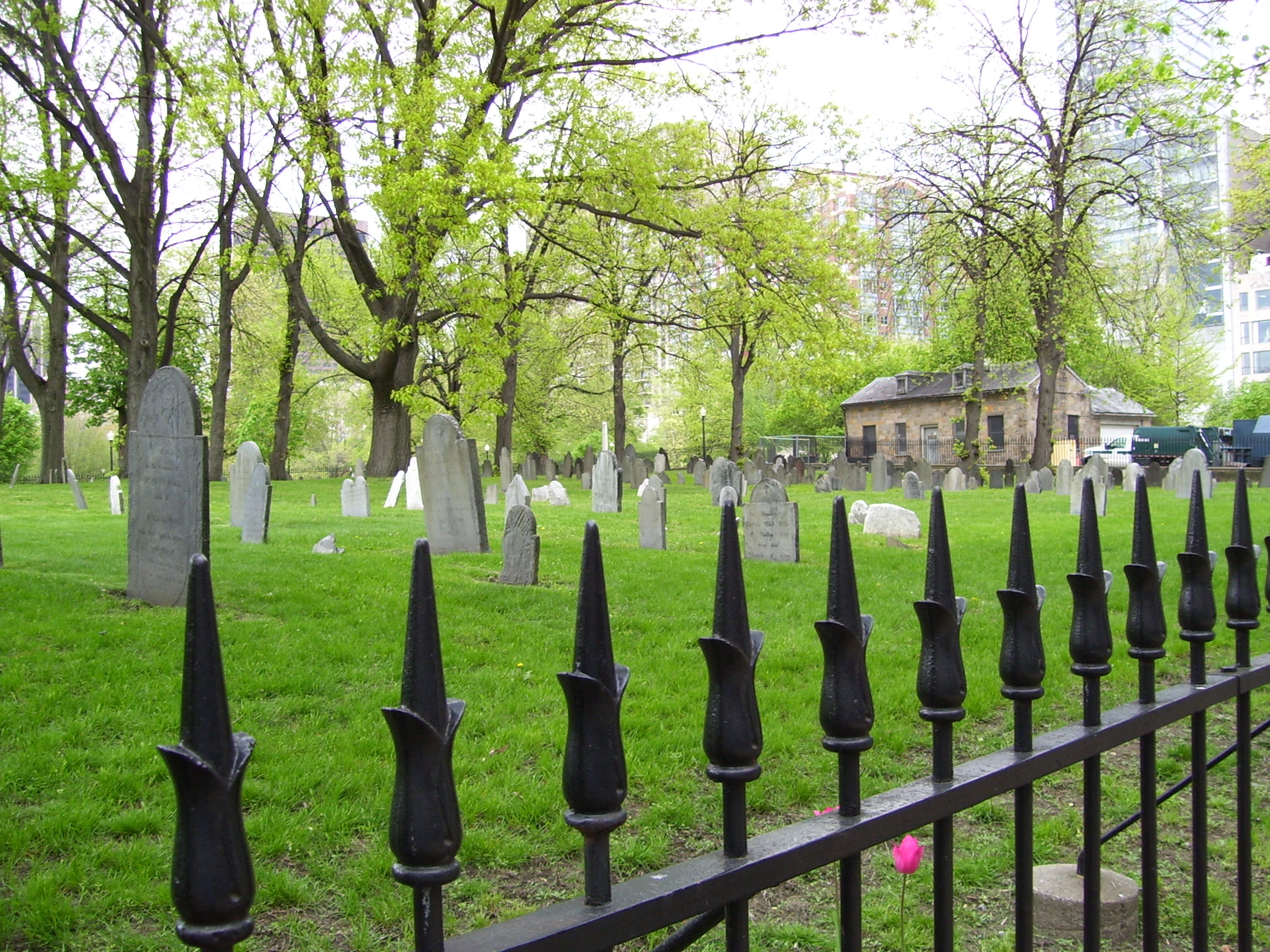
2008

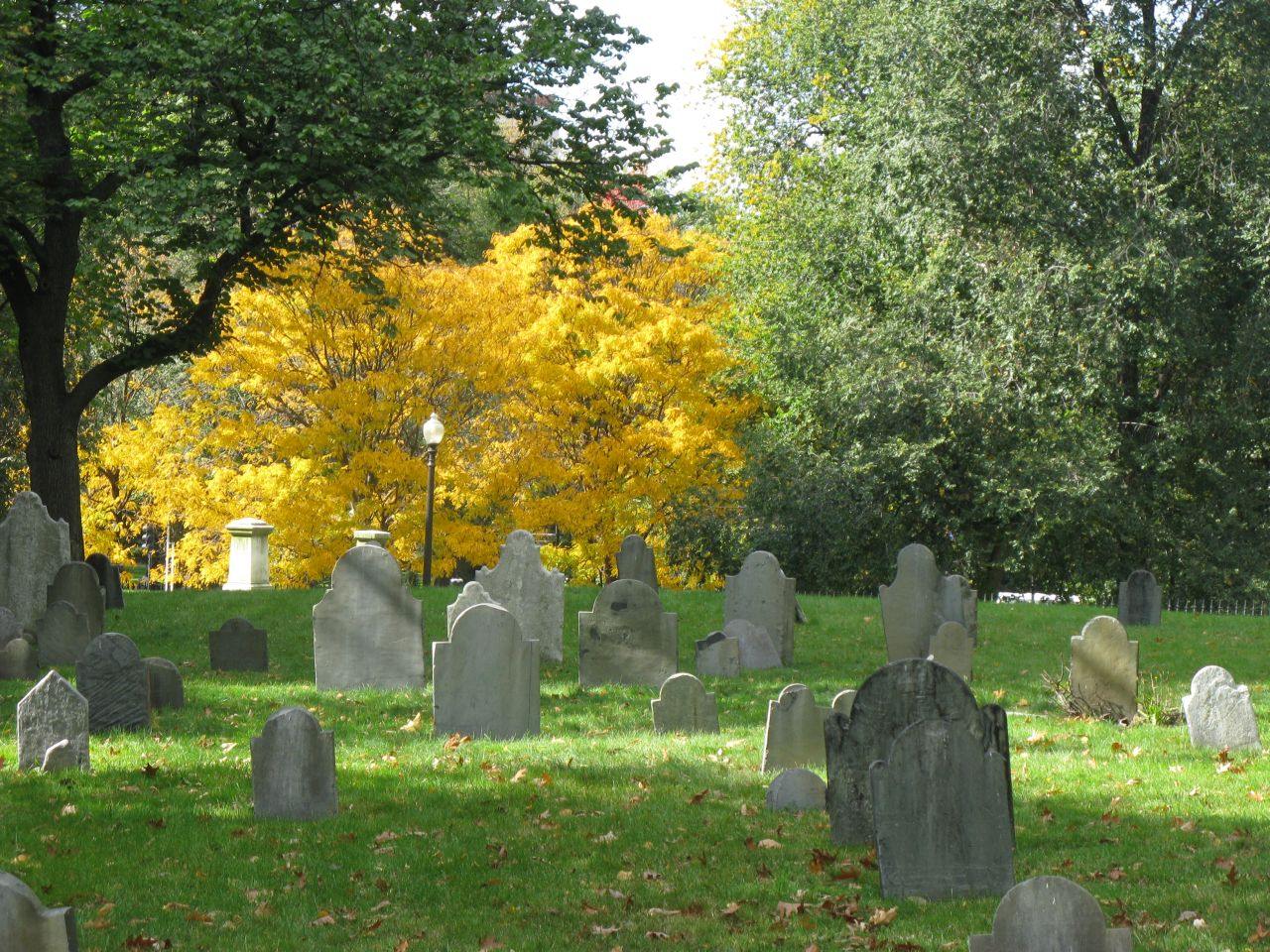
2008

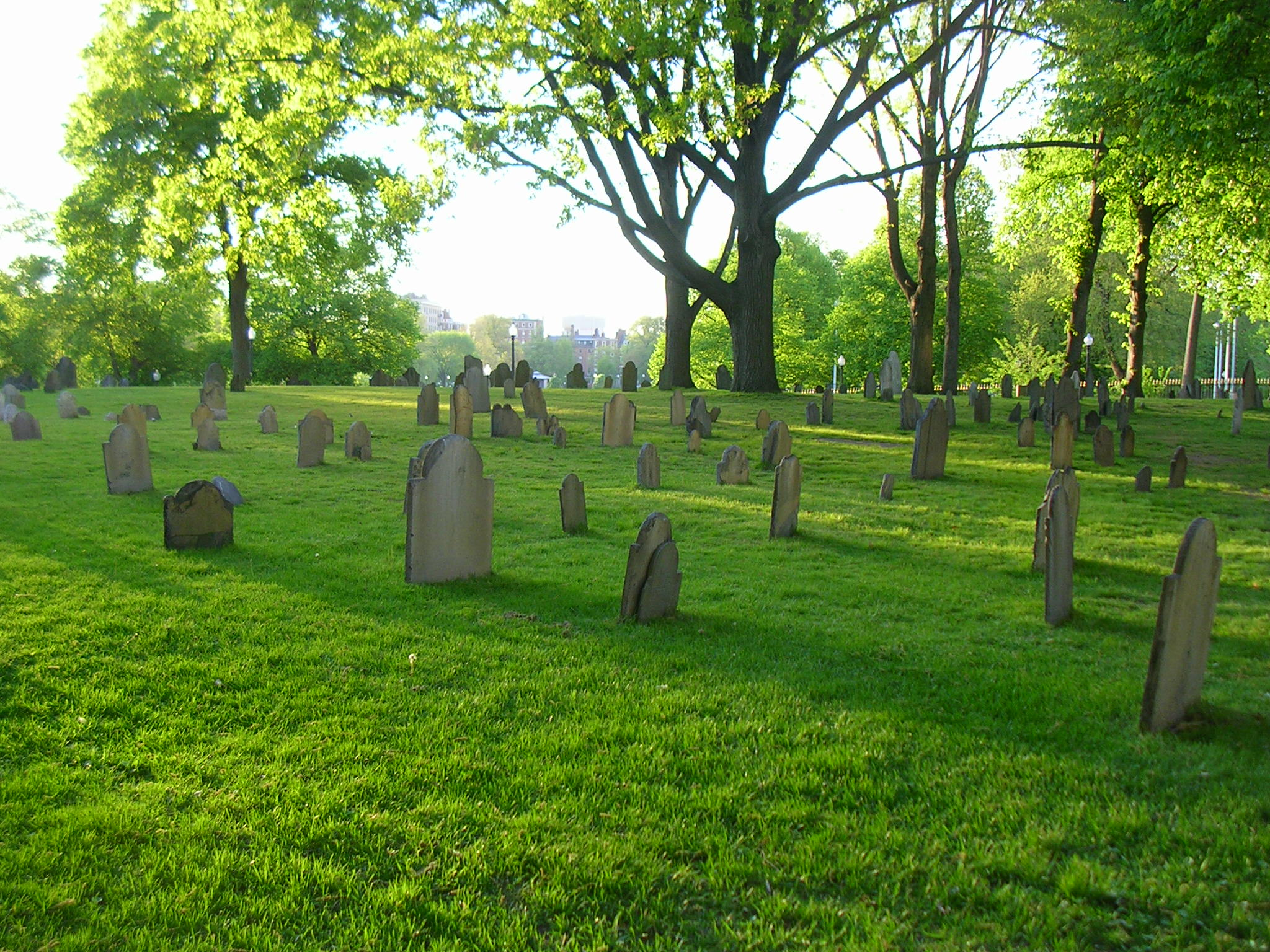
2005

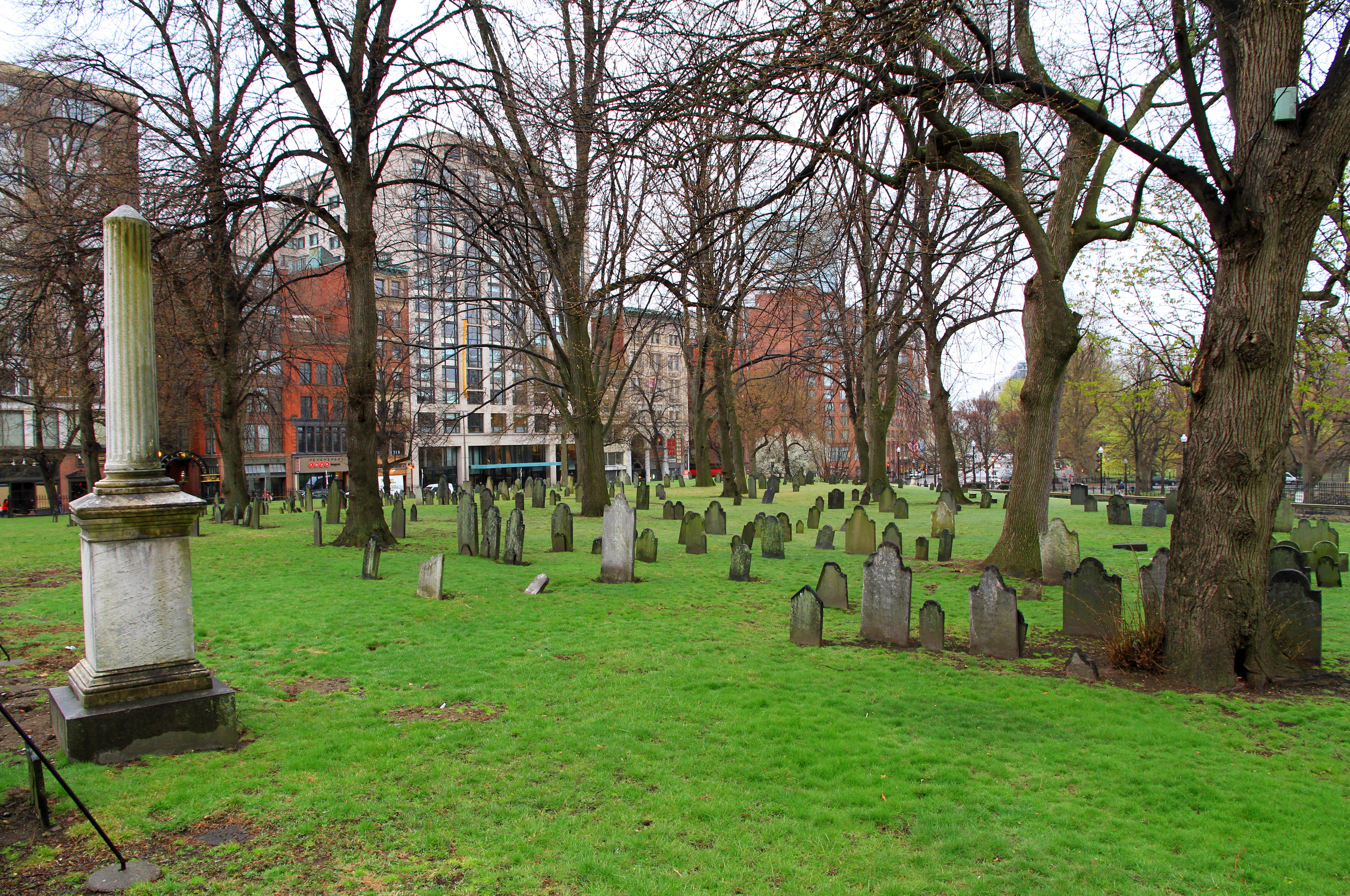
Central Burying Ground
