= Governor William Sprague Mansion =

Historic house in Rhode Island, United States

- Gov. William Sprague Mansion
- U.S. National Register of Historic Places
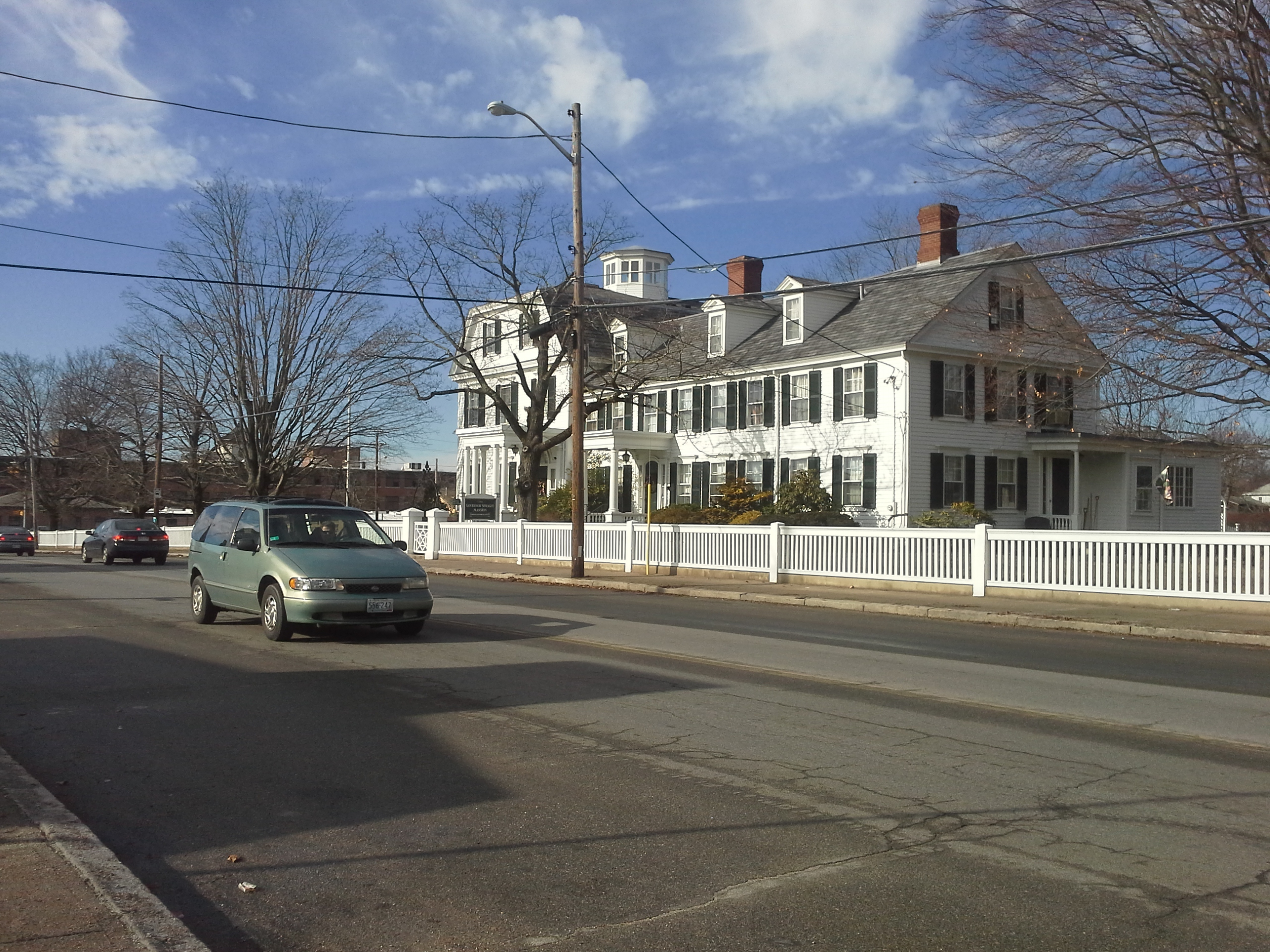

- Location within Rhode Island Location within the United States
- Location: Cranston, Rhode Island
- Coordinates: 41°47′28″N 71°27′24″W
- Built: 1790
- NRHP reference No.: 71000002
- Added to NRHP: February 18, 1971

The Governor William Sprague Mansion is a historic mansion and museum at 1351 Cranston Street in Cranston, Rhode Island. The house was the birthplace of Governor William Sprague III and his nephew, Governor William Sprague IV.

== The Sprague family ==
Three generations of the Sprague family lived in the house. The Spragues were founders of the Sprague Print Works in 1808, which later became the Cranston Print Works, which is the only continuously operating textile printing company in America. At the time of the Civil War, the A. & W. Sprague Company was the richest textile company in the United States, and William Sprague IV was the Governor of Rhode Island. William IV fought in the First Battle of Bull Run while he was a sitting Governor.

== The house ==
The house was built around 1790. It was expanded significantly in 1864 by Col. Amasa Sprague. He added a wide hall and wide, winding staircase, for the purpose of entertaining his social contacts from financial, political, and social circles.

The house was added to the National Register of Historic Places in 1971. Currently the house is owned and operated by The Cranston Historical Society, a private, non-profit educational and historic preservation organization.

== Civil War cannons ==
The Cranston Historical Society and Rhode Island National Guard underwent a years-long dispute about ownership of two cannons used by Governor William Sprague IV's regiment during the Civil War. The national guard claimed that ownership of artillery pieces returned to the federal government after the war; the historical society maintained that Sprague had purchased them outright, and were his personal property.

The cannons, manufactured in the 1840s, were used by Sprague's regiment during the Civil War. They were displayed at Cranston's Rolfe Square from 1924 to 1991, and removed because the wooden carriages were beginning to rot from exposure to the weather. The cannons were placed in the Sprague Mansion carriage house from 2005 to April 2017 when they were removed for restoration. In 2017, the sides agreed to return the cannons to the Sprague Mansion carriage house, while still leaving the question of ownership unsettled. Cranston mayor Allan Fung attended the ceremony to unveil the restored cannons on October 31, 2017.

== See also ==
- National Register of Historic Places listings in Providence County, Rhode Island
