= 1886 Rhode Island gubernatorial election =

- April 7, 1886
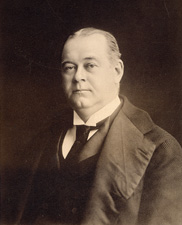

Nominee	George P. Wetmore	Amasa Sprague	George H. Slade
Party	Republican	Democratic	Prohibition
Popular vote	14,340	9,944	2,585
Percentage	53.36%	37.00%	9.62%
- Wetmore: 40–50% 50–60% 60–70% 70–80% Sprague: 40–50% 50–60% Tie: 40–50%
Governor before election
George P. Wetmore
Republican
Elected Governor
George P. Wetmore
Republican

The 1886 Rhode Island gubernatorial election was held on April 7, 1886. Incumbent Republican George P. Wetmore defeated Democratic nominee Amasa Sprague with 53.36% of the vote.

== General election ==
=== Candidates ===
Major party candidates

- George P. Wetmore, Republican
- Amasa Sprague, Democratic

Other candidates

- George H. Slade, Prohibition

=== Results ===
1886 Rhode Island gubernatorial election (Note: Some sources gives Sprague's vote as 9,994.)
Party	Candidate	Votes	%	±%
Republican	George P. Wetmore (incumbent)	14,340	53.36%	
Democratic	Amasa Sprague	9,944	37.00%	
Prohibition	George H. Slade	2,585	9.62%	
Scattering		6	0.02%	
Majority		4,396	16.36%	
Turnout		26,875		
Republican hold		Swing		
