= Amasa Sprague Jr. =

American businessman and politician

- Born: December 19, 1828; Cranston, Rhode Island
- Died: August 2, 1902 (aged 73); Cowesett, Rhode Island
- Known for: American businessman and politician

Amasa Sprague (December 19, 1828 – August 2, 1902) was an American businessman and politician from Rhode Island. Born into an influential family, Sprague was a multi-millionaire textile industrialist until the Panic of 1873. He held various political offices in Rhode Island and was the Democratic nominee for Governor of Rhode Island in the 1886 election.

== Business ==
Sprague was born on December 19, 1828, at the family residence in Cranston, Rhode Island. He attended public and private schools and the East Greenwich Academy. Following his father's murder in 1843, Sprague began to handle a large amount of responsibility for the A & W Sprague. After the death of his uncle William Sprague III, Sprague and his brother William Sprague IV took control of the family's mills. They completed construction of the Baltic, Connecticut, cotton mill planned by their uncle. The company's business grew during the American Civil War. During the early 1870s, the output of A & W Sprague's nine mills was greater than all of the other mills in the United States combined and the firm's profits were around $20 million annually. Due to bad investments and careless speculation, the company fell into receivership following the Panic of 1873 and by 1875, almost all of the Spragues' assets had been sold.

== Politics ==
Sprague served on his brother's staff during his term as governor and received the title of colonel. He represented Cranston in the Rhode Island House of Representatives from 1864 to 1865 and again from 1884 to 1885. After moving to Cowesett he represented Warwick, Rhode Island, in the Rhode Island Senate. In 1886, Sprague was the Democratic nominee for Governor of Rhode Island. He lost to Republican incumbent George P. Wetmore 53% to 37%. From 1890 until his death in 1902, Sprague served as sheriff of Kent County, Rhode Island. In 1890, Sprague switched from the Democratic Party to the Republican Party.

== Horse racing ==
During the civil war, Sprague purchased horses for the 1st Rhode Island Cavalry Regiment. After the war he bought a stock farm in Kansas and sold over 300 horses by 1873. In 1861, Sprague formed a partnership with Edward Babcock to operate a trotting park on a portion on Babcock's farm. The pair had a falling out over alleged gambling at the track and in 1867, Sprague opened Narragansett Park in Cranston, Rhode Island. In 1870, he helped found the National Association for the Promotion of the Interests of American Trotting Turf and served as the organization's president until his resignation in 1876. In 1881, Narragansett Park was purchased at auction for $25,000 (~$697,111 in 2024) by J. B. Barnaby.

== Personal life ==
Sprague had one daughter, Fannie, with his first wife, Mary Warburton. On November 12, 1873, he married Harriet Byron Sprague, daughter of his first cousin Byron Sprague. They had one son, Amasa Sprague III.

In the 1870s, Sprague constructed a large mansion in Cowesett, Rhode Island. He lived there until his death on August 2, 1902. The mansion was purchased by Walter R. Stiness following Sprague's death. It was later destroyed by fire.
