= HMS Spragge =

HMS Spragge has been the name of more than one ship of the British Royal Navy, and may refer to:

- HMS Spragge (1673), a fireship purchased in 1673, renamed Young Spragge in 1677, and lost in 1693
- HMS Spragge (1677), a fireship of 1677
- HMS Spragge (1919), a destroyer leader cancelled in 1919
- HMS Spragge (K572), a frigate in service from 1944 to 1946
