= Spragg =

Spragg is a surname. Notable people with the surname include:

- Edward Spragge or Spragg or Sprague (c. 1620 – 1673), admiral of the Royal Navy
- Laura Spragg (born 1982), English international cricketer
- Lonnie Spragg (1879–1904), Australian rugby player
- Mark Spragg (born 1952), American writer
- Warren Spragg (born 1982), English-born Italian rugby player
- Wesley Spragg (1848–1930), New Zealand butter manufacturer, temperance campaigner, and benefactor

== See also ==
- Spragge
- Sprague (surname)
- Sprag clutch, a one-way freewheel clutch
- Spragg Bag, a flexible barge
