= Lyon's Whelp =

- A ship from the time of Charles I of England, before 1649

History

England
- Name: Lion's Whelp
- Ordered: 28 February 1628
- Builder: William Castell, John Dearsley, Christopher Malim, Peter Massin, Peter Pett, John and Mathew Graves and Robert Trankmore
- Cost: £120 (contract signed), £120 (laying beams), £3,5/- ton (finishing, launching)
- Laid down: March 1628
- Launched: late July, 1628
- Acquired: Duke of Buckingham, July, 1628; Royal Navy, 1632
- Commissioned: 1632
- In service: 1628 to 1632 to 1654
- Out of service: 1628 to 1632 to 1654
- Fate: Various
- Notes: John Graves built eighth and ninth Whelps. Phineas Pett's certificates of works done have survived for all Whelps except the ninth.

General characteristics
- Type: 3-masted pinnace, auxiliary oared warship
- Displacement: 186 tons 180 long tons (183 t)
- Length: 62 ft (19 m) pp; 75 ft (23 m) overall
- Beam: 25 ft (7.6 m)
- Depth of hold: 9 ft (2.7 m)
- Propulsion: Sweeps (two oars between each cannon port). (Note: There were discrete, small ports for "sweeps" (32' oars, each worked by 3 men). This galley-like feature can be traced back at least to Henry VIII's time. Frigates had oar ports well into the 18th century.)
- Armament: 9 broadside cannons, 2 sternchase gunports (Note: The number and configuration of the gunports in the Lion's Whelp design was a bit complicated. In what follows, 'port' refers to gun-port. "To make a Quarter-deck with two ports right astern and two quarter ports with a convenient Bulkhead (partition) and sight for Steerage. To make eight ports on each side from the bulkhead of the steerage forward and to fit places to row with two oars betwixt each port". "Port" here means a gunport. It is unclear whether the "quarter-deck" ports are at Gun deck level (ie. under the quarter-deck) or are for guns mounted on the quarter-deck." (Wassell favored the quarter-deck.) "Only two guns were fitted right aft due to lack of space, to be fired either astern or as part of the broadside. This gives a total of 20 gunports, but the practical maximum armament was 16 guns as a similar lack of space in the bows meant that only one gun on each side, the "bowchaser", could be fired either out of the foremost port or from the next port aft. The forward end of the gundeck had to accommodate the foremast, bowsprit, riding bitts and a galley chimney. This description means that there was to be one gun deck fitted with 9 gunports each side, plus two sternchase gunports . . .") (Note: The above dimensions show the Whelps to have been relatively broad in the beam. This was to allow them carry the proposed armament of 10 guns each. Each ship was to have 2 brass Sakers (6 lb shot) 4 demi-culverins (9 lb shot) and 4 culverins (18 lb shot). This was a remarkably heavy armament for ships of this size- the culverin being the standard lower gun deck armament of the biggest two-deckers of the time. This was achieved by using iron "drake" versions of demi-culverin and culverin. These were lighter than the standard cannon and used a smaller powder charge (an early equivalent of the carronade). They also weighed less than the brass sakers, despite the heavier ball. In addition, 26 iron demi-cannon drakes were added just before the departure of the fleet for La Rochelle! These guns fired a 32 lb shot and three of the Whelps received four such cannon. However, apparently they were left in the holds of most Whelps as the captains considered the decks too weak to support them.")
- Notes: The Whelps were classed as ships "of the sixth rank"

Lyon's Whelp or Lion's Whelp is the name of a historical British ship, it is also found in the Bible in Genesis 49:9 “Judah is a lion’s whelp." Popular today, the name was given to a series of 16th-century naval ships, then in the 17th century to a fleet of ten full rigged pinnaces commissioned by the first Duke of Buckingham.

== Introduction ==
The 10 Lion's Whelps built by the 1st Duke of Buckingham in 1628 are exemplars of the 'war' pinnace, a war ship that was built for several European navies for more than two centuries (c.1550-c.1750). The Whelps had sweeps (propelling oars) as well as sails (G R Balleine, All for the King, The Life Story of Sir George Carteret, Societe Jersiase, 1976, p10). England, the Netherlands, Sweden and Poland deployed the war pinnace on a regular basis. The largest war pinnaces, also known as frigates, approximated England's fifth rate and sixth rate small warships. A few war pinnaces were built to fourth-rate hull dimensions. However, these war pinnaces carried fewer cannon and had smaller crews than English fourth, fifth, and sixth rates. Fast and maneuverable when compared to a typical ship of the line, when they were under the command of an experienced captain with a crew that retained discipline during battle, many war pinnaces compiled impressive fighting and espionage records.

English War Pinnace, de Verwer, c.1625.

Ten ships of the name Lyon's Whelp were built in 1628 by George Villiers, 1st Duke of Buckingham, and each was constructed to the same design. Although masted and armed from the stores of the Royal Navy, the fleet was paid for by the Duke. The entire fleet of ten Lion's Whelps cost Buckingham about £7,000 and for several years, they were his private fleet. With the exception of the Earl of Pembroke, the Duke of Buckingham was the wealthiest nobleman in England at this time. This shipbuilding program indicates that the Duke of Buckingham could access very significant funds. The Duke spent £7000 in 1628 to build his fleet which in 2017 would be worth £855,044.40.

Under the Duke's command, the Lion's Whelps were privateers dedicated to increasing his considerable personal fortune. The fleet of ten Lions Whelps was not taken over by the Navy until 1632, after Buckingham's assassination in 1628, and compensation of at least £4000 was paid to his estate. (Note: In 1619, King James I appointed George Villiers, 1st Duke of Buckingham to the Admiralty and he became the Lord Admiral of England. Jovial and good-natured to all who supported him, as a typical courtier Villiers was most interested in satisfying his vanity and arranging marriages for friends and those who were politically connected. The Duke had few qualities that would make him an effective admiral of the Royal Fleet. Nearly all of his political and military stratagems proved to be disasters.)

== The Earl of Nottingham ==
Lyon's Whelp was the name given to several British naval ships dating back to the 16th century, including at least two that were not financed or built by the Duke of Buckingham. The immediate predecessor to Buckingham's fleet of 10 Lion's Whelps was a war ship named Lion's Whelp that was owned by Charles Howard, 1st Earl of Nottingham, who was the Lord High Admiral of England (1585–1619) and who was succeeded by the Duke of Buckingham.

Royal Arms of England was painted on the stern of Lion's Whelps.

This Lion's Whelp was loaned to Sir Walter Raleigh and joined the English fleet for the combined Anglo-Dutch attack and expected capture of Cádiz in 1596. (Note: Wassell's 1595 reference is likely to Raleigh's participation in this combined English and Dutch attack and capture of Cádiz in 1596. There was no expedition of any significance undertaken by Sir Walter Raleigh in 1595.) Robert Devereux, 2nd Earl of Essex and Sir Walter Raleigh were among the commanders of landing forces while Sir Charles Howard as admiral led the fleet. Victory was swift because the Spanish fleet had been set afire in order not be captured and their land army was badly organized. The Dutch and English sacked and pillaged Cádiz all the while respecting its citizens much to the astonishment of the Spanish. This Lion's Whelp was sold to the state in 1602, and then repaired at Chatham by the ambitious young shipwright Phineas Pett (see below). The Duke of Buckingham received this Lion's Whelp as a gift from King James VI in 1625, shortly before the King died. Ratification of the transfer of ownership occurred under King Charles.

Ensign flown from the Lion's Whelps stern.

== Warrants, contracts, and shipbuilders ==
Several years ago, John Wassell worked with the Public Record Office in London and England's Calendars of State Papers to research the ten Lion's Whelps built by the Duke of Buckingham in 1628. His web page presents the most important information obtained - original period documents from the archive "State Papers, Domestic". Each Whelp had one gun deck, two masts with a rig that included square sails and lateen. There are only a few contemporary drawings and paintings of English war pinnaces or frigates of the Jacobean era. Details of hull design, armament and rigging are usually inferred using prints and hull designs of warships in the Dutch Navy. (Note: Lofting a ship the size of a Dutch or English war pinnace by eye was likely well within the capabilities of their shipwrights. A similar challenge was successfully met in 18th and 19th century American shipyards that built schooners, barques and brigantines, small and large.)

The Duke of Buckingham's project to build 10 Lion's Whelps began with his warrant to two well-placed friends. Captain Sir John Penington and Phineas Pett ensured that the ablest shipwrights of the region would be available for the building of this fleet. Their basic design was a warship of 125 tons with both sails and oars ('sweeps'). Ship construction would be done on the banks of the River Thames, particularly at Ipswich and Shorum. The Lord Admiral was to oversee the "preparation and setting out" for 10 pinnaces of 120 tons each. (Each Lion's Whelp was built to 186 tons.. see below.) Each ship was to have a tender, and adequate supplies of oars, cable, anchors, sails, canvas and 'all other tackling and rigging to be furnished from his 'Majesties Stores', likewise for ordnance and ammunition. "Their Lordships well approving of the said motion did think fit and order the same accordingly." The motive for building these ten ships was the 'enterprise of La Rochelle'. These ten ships would be added to the English fleet that would undertake to relieve the siege of the French Huguenot (Protestant) center of power at La Rochelle imposed by King Louis XIII. Considerable resources must have been available because Phinaeus Pett left this employment at the end of July, which indicates that the ten ships had been completed and launched by that time (~6 months) or shortly thereafter. Thereupon the Duke's fleet set sail for Portsmouth and assignments with the Royal Navy. (Note: The group that met at Whitehall on 27 February 1627 was impressive. The heart of England's political and military power was present: Lord Keeper (of the privy seal)- Lord Treasurer - Lord President (of the council) - Lord Admiral - Lord Steward - Earl of Suffolk - Earl of Dorset - Earl of Exeter - Earl of Morton - Earl of Kelley - Viscount Wimbledon - Viscount Grandison - Mr. Treasurer – Master of the Ward(robe) - Mr. Chanc(ellor) of the Exchequer - Mr Chanc. of the Duchy (of Lancaster).)

Although there are no surviving remains of any of the ten Lion's Whelps built by the Duke of Buckingham, it is possible to obtain a portrait of these ships. Dutch marine painters of the period often included detailed examples of Dutch, English and Spanish ships in their paintings. A small oil-on-copper painting by Abraham de Verwer c.1625, that is now in the England's National Maritime Museum, shows Dutch and English war pinnaces saluting each other outside a harbour. The English ship is a good fit to the reconstructed profile for a Buckingham Lion's Whelp as a three-masted war pinnace with a single gun deck that had eight broadside cannon ports. There is a grating or 'flying deck' over the waist, and Royal Arms decorated the stern. There is another and similar painting of an English single-deck war pinnace in the National Maritime Museum.

== The Anglo-French War ==
England invades the Isle de Re in 1627. A few pinnaces may be glimpsed among the 800-ship English fleet.

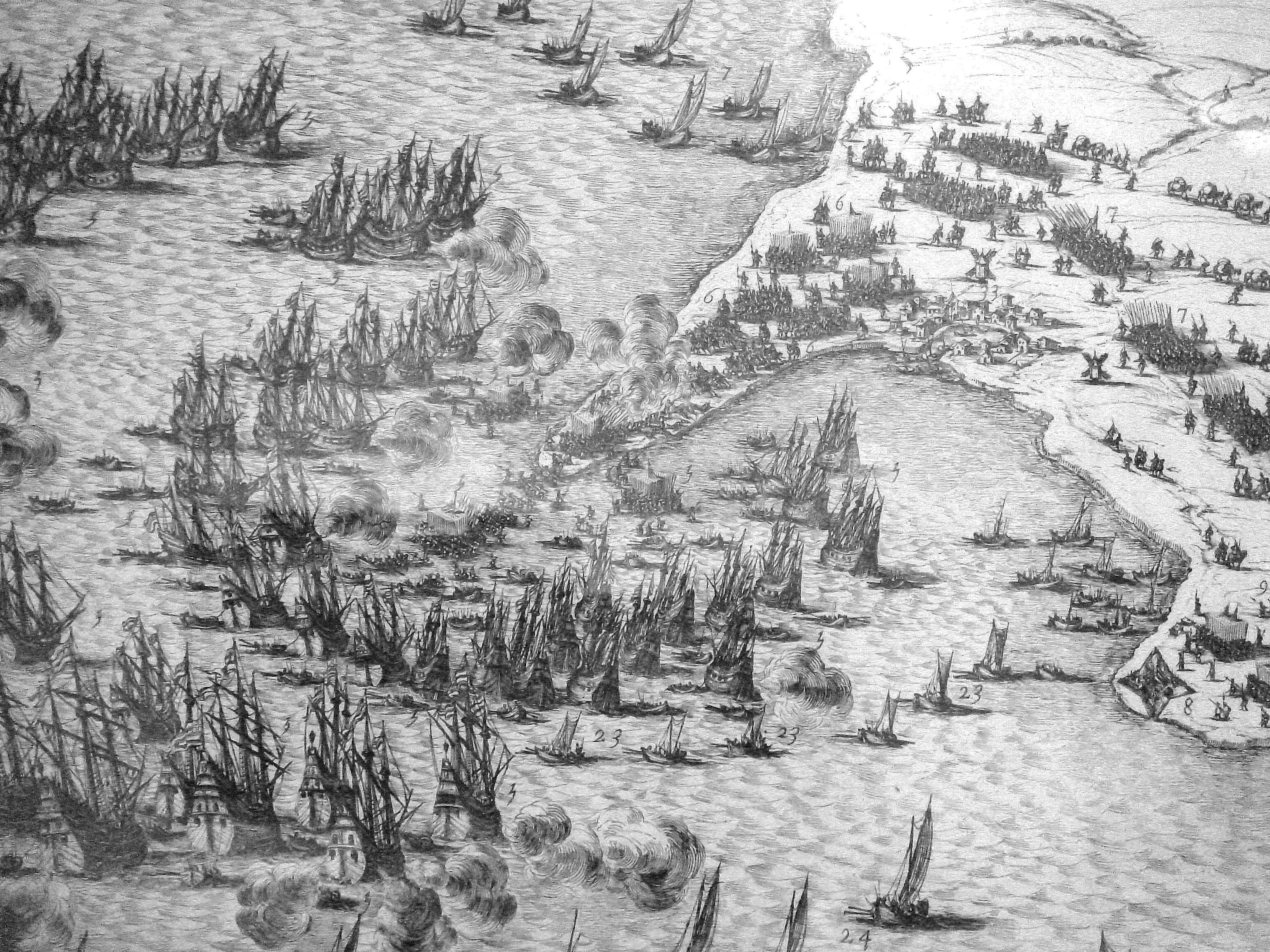
Buckingham's fleet lands at the beach of Sablanceau.

At least one of Buckingham's ten Lion's Whelps saw service with the British Fleet in England's attempt to relieve the Huguenot citadel of La Rochelle. English action in the Anglo-French War began with a siege of the fortress of Saint-Martin-de-Re in 1627. The English fleet was not able to lay siege to La Rochelle until several months later.

Historians are indebted to Jacques Callot who published a series of prints illustrating the English landing on the Isle de Re at the beach of Sablanceau, the Siege of Saint Martin-de-Re and the Siege of La Rochelle. (Note: Master of advanced etching techniques, Jacques Callot is credited with technical innovations such as the echoppe (needle) that allowed etchers to create a 'swelling' line; a lute maker's varnish based, etching ground that allowed for highly detailed work equal to that of engravers, and multiple "stoppings-out" which provided etchers with heretofore unknown possibilities to achieve subtle effects of distance and light.) Callot's technical innovations enhanced the detail in his prints. In his portrayal of the English fleet, it is possible to differentiate galleons, carracks, pinnaces and perhaps shallops because each ship type had the same minute iconic image. Perhaps one of the pinnaces in these prints is Buckingham's sixth Lion's Whelp.

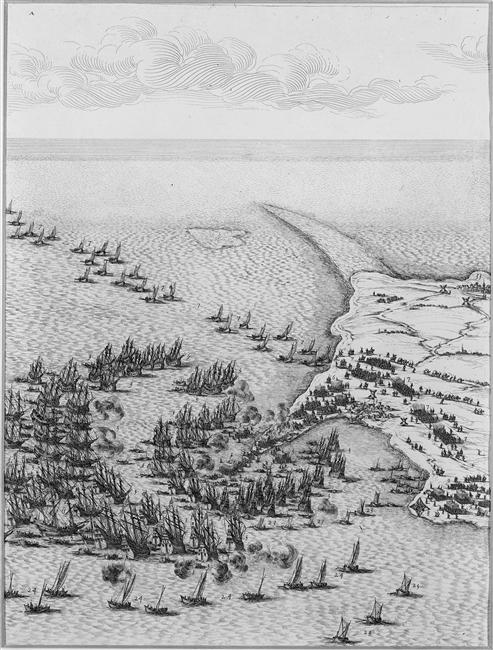
English Siege of the St. Martin Citadel, Callot Pl.1

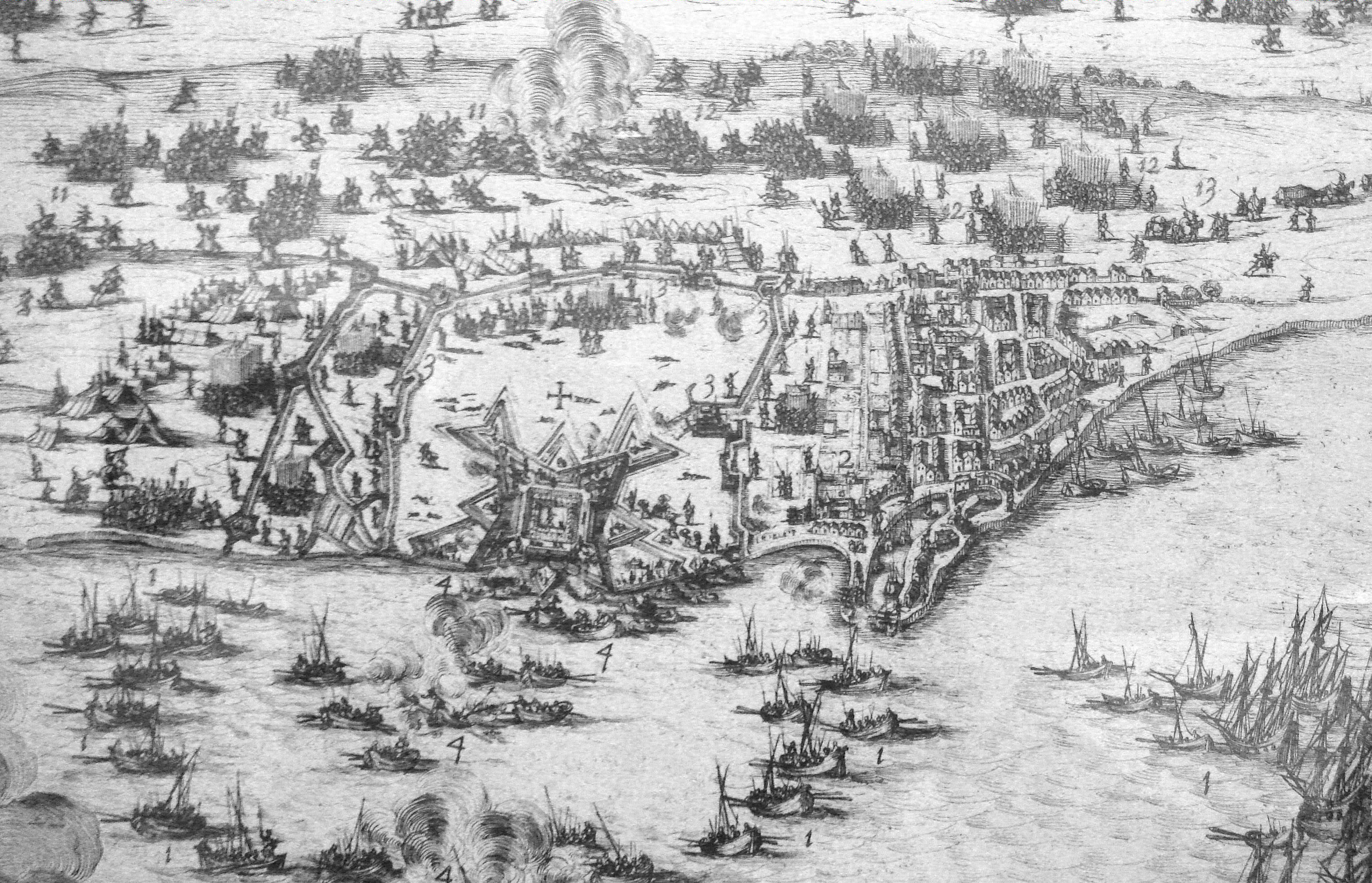
Siege of Saint Martin by the Duke of Buckingham.

The besotted King James I assigned a central role to his favorite courtier with the expedition to relieve the Huguenot stronghold of La Rochelle. England hoped that a success would bring the French Protestants into an alliance against Catholic Spain and provide a demonstration of English naval power that would leave King Louis XIII hesitant and fearful. English King James I had made George Villiers, Lord Admiral of the Royal Navy in 1619. As an important commander during the Siege of Saint-Martin-de-Ré (1627) and the attempt to relieve La Rochelle, the Duke of Buckingham revealed a serious lack of understanding and expertise when faced with both army and naval strategic challenges.

The siege of Saint-Martin-de-Ré was the first action in this attempt to take La Rochelle and it began when Buckingham's fleet landed troops on the beach at Sablanceau. Apparently Buckingham insisted on an orderly, slow and methodical organization of his army on the exposed beach, even as French troops and cavalry made repeated lightning attacks, emerging from the protection of the sand dunes. About 100 English casualties on the beach were unnecessary. Later, it was revealed that Buckingham's preparations for the siege of Saint Martin included ladders that proved too short to reach the top of Saint-Martin-de-Re's walls.

At least two English war pinnaces can be seen in the Callot print of Buckingham's fleet at Loix.

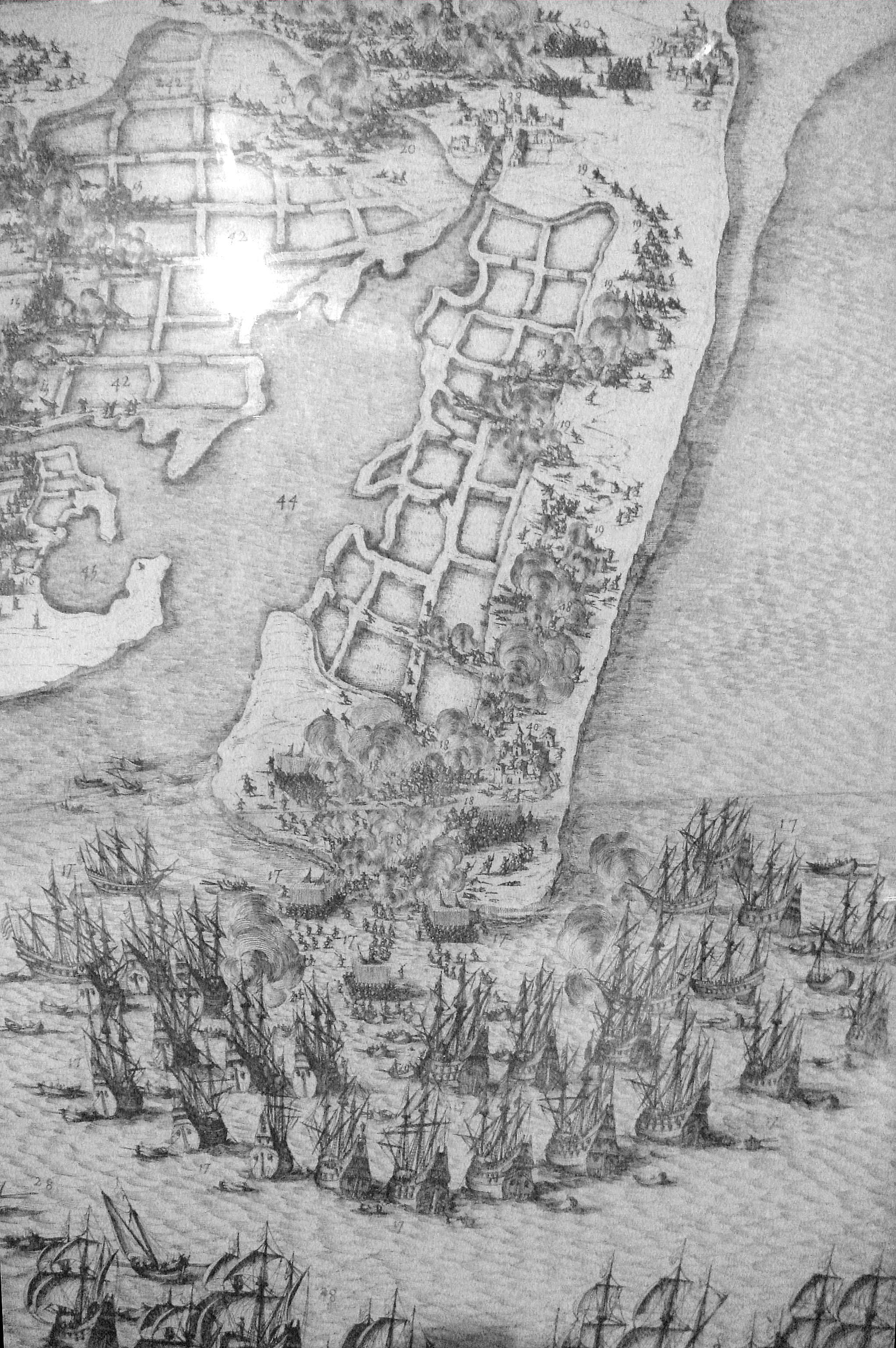
After three months, Buckingham called off the Siege of Saint-Martin. He retreated to Loix, then sailed home to England, defeated and humiliated.

English strategy correctly viewed the fortress of Saint-Martin-de-Re as a serious impediment to an assault on La Rochelle. With 80 ships and 7,000 men, Buckingham failed to take the fortress city. After three months and a final failed assault on 27 October 1627, he ended the siege and left for England from Loix with a demoralized, disease ridden force of 2,000 men, the survivors of his original army of 7,000 men. (Note: King Charles would send two more fleets to relieve the Siege of La Rochelle. William Fielding, Earl of Dengbigh, sailed for La Rochelle in April 1628 but returned without a fight claiming that had no commission that authorized him to participate in fighting. The Duke of Buckingham organized the next fleet which sailed under the Earl of Lindsey who was now the Admiral of the Fleet. The Earl of Lindsey sailed in August, 1628 with 29 warships and 31 merchantmen and in September 1628, they attempted to relieve La Rochelle. The English bombarded the French positions and tried to force the sea wall, all in vain. The Earl of Lindsey was forced to withdraw and return to England. La Rochelle surrendered to King Louis XIII on 28 October 1628 and Catholicism in France solidified. England then ended its participation in the Thirty Years War by signing a peace treaty with France in 1629, and with Spain in 1639.)

== A Lion's Whelp to Massachusetts ==
In 1629 a Lion's Whelp sailed with four other ships from Gravesend on 25 April 1629 for the Massachusetts Bay Colony. Arrived and greeted by Governor John Endecott on 30 June 1629. All ships were armed merchantmen. Eight cannon were listed for this Lion's Whelp which is the number carried by the Duke of Buckingham's Lion's Whelps and most armed pinnaces as well. This Lion's Whelp is tentatively identified as the 120-ton ship that brought William Dodge, along with the Sprague family and others to Salem, Massachusetts in 1629. The Lyon's Whelp left Gravesend 24/25 April 1629 and arrived in Salem mid-July 1629, under Master John Gibbs (or Gibbon). It was one of six ships in a small fleet; the others including Talbot, George Bonaventure, Lyon, and a ship called Mayflower (though not the Mayflower of the Pilgrims). This Lion's Whelp and her sister ships the Talbot and the George carried goods and new settlers to Naumkaeg, the Indian name for the territory settled by England's Massachusetts Bay Company at Salem.

== Appendix: 10 Lion's Whelps ==
Final costings for each Lion's Whelp are believed to have been in excess of the contracted rate, thereby raising the possibility that shipwrights deliberately built ships larger than agreed upon in order to inflate the final invoice. The worse example of this was Peter Pett and the sixth Whelp. The Duke wanted each Whelp to weigh 120 tonnes, and cost £139.5.

After the Duke was assassinated in 1632, his fleet of ten Lion Whelps was taken into the Royal Navy and the estate reimbursed £4,500 according to Captain Penington who had supervised their construction. Had the fleet been sold to England, as the Earl of Nottingham had done with his Lion's Whelp in 1602, very likely much more money would have accrued to the Buckingham estate.

- Buckingham's first Lion's Whelp was built by William Castell of Southwark St Saviour in 1628. After the Duke was assassinated in 1632, she was taken into the Royal Navy and then converted into a chain ship for the Chatham "barricado" c. 1641. She was sent to Harwich as a careening hulk in August 1650, and then drops out of the historical record. Lion's Whelp may be the hulk at Harwich that was ordered to be sold in October 1651.
- The second Lion's Whelp was also built by William Castell of St. Savior's in Southwark. She was converted into a chain ship for the Chatham 'barricado' c.1641, then was ordered to be sold in August, 1650 together with the Defiance and Merhonour as having become too decayed, even to be a careening hulk at Harwich.

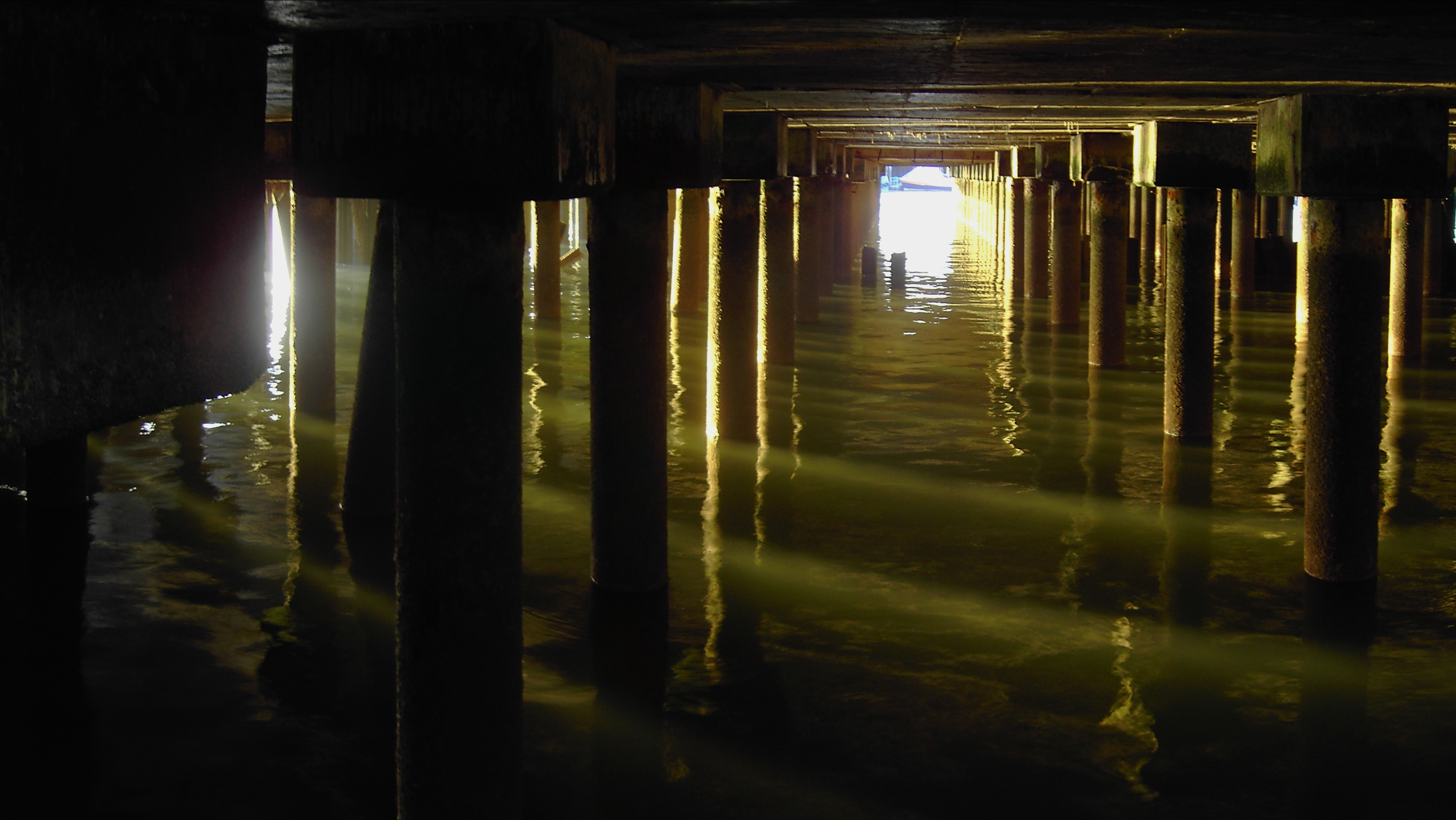
Under the quay at Harwich

- The third Lion's Whelp was built by John Dearsley of Ipswich at Wapping. She was listed as unfit for service in Batten's survey of 1647 and 'cast' before February, 1643.
- The fourth Lion's Whelp was built by Christopher Malim of Redriff. She was used for experimental constructions in the Project Dutchman, c.1633. These works in the hold were ordered for removal in March 1643 because they were of no use in a man-o-war. Details of the experimental constructions are lacking, although Warrell's research points to Cornelius Drebbel as having executed the removal order. The fourth Lion's Whelp struck a rock in St. Aubrey's Bay, Jersey on 4 August 1636 and sank without any loss of life.
- The fifth Lion's Whelp was built by Peter Marsh of Wapping and spent most of her life in service in Ireland. She foundered in the North Sea on 28 June 1637 and sank with the loss of 17 men. Cause of this tragedy was placed with the shipyard who built her of 'mean, sappy timbers'. (Note: Wassell reproduces the report of Captain Edwin Popham regarding the loss of the fifth Lion's Whelp in a terrible storm. She sank four hours after springing her first leak, the pumps were quickly overpowered. 17 men died with the fifth Lion's Whelp as she sank, the captain with 40 men survived in a small boat. Four hours rowing brought them to an English ship and rescue.)
- The sixth Lion's Whelp was built by Peter Pett of Ratcliffe. Peter Pett (1610-?1672) was an English Master Shipwright, the second Resident Commissioner of the Chatham Dockyard. (Note: He was either: a) half brother of Phineas Pett (d.1631 – not likely); or b) son (d.1649) of the second marriage of Master Shipwright Peter Pett of Deptford (d.1589)) Phinaes Pett was viewed as the greatest shipbuilder of his time, indeed perhaps the finest to have ever lived and worked in England. The reputation of the Pett dynasty ensured that the sixth Lion's Whelp was designed and constructed to the highest standards. Her captain was John Pett (1601/2 – 1628), the eldest son of Phineas Pett who died when the ship went down off the coast of Brittany when returning from the La Rochelle expedition in 1628.
- The seventh Lion's Whelp was built by Matthew Graves of Limehouse, She and the famous ship-of-the-line' Mary Rose got into a dispute with a Dutch warship from Enkhuisen over a Dutch privateer captured off the Suffolk coast. Negligence in the powder store led to a fierce explosion that destroyed the seventh Lion's Whelp amidst action involving several ships from both countries. There is speculation that Captain Cooper became severely disoriented immediately after the loss of the ship, and thereafter was mentally incompetent.
- The eighth Lion's Whelp was built in the yard of John Graves of Limehouse. In 1633 she was given to George Carteret as his first independent command. His first task was to attend the Vauntguard which Penington commanded (Balleine, op. cit, p10). Later, in 1644 she was used to transport gold to the Scottish parliament. The Eighth is another pinnace in the Duke's fleet that went 'rotten'. In July 1645, she was judged too decayed to repair and ordered to be laid up on the Woolwich shore.
- The ninth Lion's Whelp was also built by John Graves of Limehouse and spent her active years in the Irish service, where she was mainly used to put down piracy in Dublin Bay, and sometimes to ferry important visitors to Ireland. Her captain was Dawtrey Cooper in 1632/33, who had been the captain of the seventh Lion's Whelp when a seaman's negligence caused a fearful explosion and loss of life. During the ninth Lion's Whelp service at Ireland, there were continual disputes and near mutinies. She came to an end as a wreck in the River Clyde with the pinnace Confidence while taking supplies from Ireland to Dumbarton Castle (which is on the Clyde near Glasgow) in April, 1640. There is an incorrect record that the eighth and ninth Lion's Whelps were lost in a storm in 1628 that had wrecked the sixth. After a brief period of out of contact, the eighth and ninth returned to Portsmouth.
- The tenth Lion's Whelp was built by Robert Tranckmore of Shoreham, went over to the Royalists after the fall of Bristol in 1643, then was recaptured by Parliament's forces in 1645. She was at Helvoetsluys with the Earl of Warwick's fleet in 1648, then was fitted out as a fireship for Blake's pursuit of Prince Rupert to Lisbon in 1650. Later the tenth Lion's Whelp was used for convoy work and communications during the First Anglo-Dutch War. The last historical mention of the tenth Lion's Whelp is on 19 October 1654 when she was sold to Jacob Blackpath for £410.

With sale of the tenth, this fleet of Lion's Whelps passes from recorded history. Their fragmentary historical record has provided additional information about the building of small war ships in the 17th century, and activities of the Royal Navy in the Anglo-French War.
