= Leigh Sprague =

Leigh Sprague (born Leigh Elisha Sprague; 7 April 1970) is an American former attorney, who specialized in representing Russian oligarchs in their international activities. He stole money while being employed by UC Rusal, a company run by one of the richest oligarchs, Oleg Deripaska.

Sprague's activities came to the attention of federal prosecutors, who initiated a case against him before Judge Thelton Henderson in the United States District Court for the Northern District of California. Sprague pleaded guilty to one count of transportation of stolen money in December 2013. He was sentenced in March 2014 to 50 months in prison.

== Early life ==
Sprague was born in Santa Cruz, California and raised in Fort Atkinson, Wisconsin. Sprague excelled in school and was awarded a scholarship to the University of Wisconsin–Madison. Prior to attending, he participated in an AFS Intercultural Programs exchange program in then-Yugoslavia, an event that sparked his lifelong interest in international affairs and foreign cultures. Upon graduation in 1993, Sprague was selected as a Junior Fellow by the Carnegie Endowment for International Peace. While there, he worked as an editor of Foreign Policy. Several years later, after a stint in the Peace Corps and work as a journalist, Sprague was admitted to Columbia Law School in New York City, where he graduated with honors in 1999.

== Career ==
Sprague specialized in international commercial law, leading numerous, large-scale commercial transactions with an international component. In 2001, he moved to Moscow, Russia, where he applied his specialty to matters arising out of the rapid economic development that followed the fall of the Soviet Union. In 2007, he was hired by UC RUSAL as a lawyer to work on its initial public offering.

== Wrongdoing ==
Sprague had access to a derivative instrument set up by a subsidiary of UC RUSAL called "Rypotus" that was designed to give UC RUSAL control over a certain number of voting shares in a company Norilsk Nickel, which was then the subject of arbitration between Interros and UC RUSAL. Sprague fraudulently extracted $10 million from the derivative instrument, wiring the stolen funds to Switzerland, Hong Kong, and the United States.

He used these funds for various personal purposes, including the acquisition of a fleet of classic cars and repairs to his house in California, which actually reduced the sale-value of the house. According to court documents, an addiction to over-the-counter cold medicine contributed to Sprague's actions.

UC RUSAL learned of the theft in April 2011 when Sprague was caught trying to steal another $5 million. Sprague managed to flee Russia and ultimately took up residence in the United States. Federal prosecutors later learned of Sprague's actions from UC RUSAL, which contacted the FBI and Department of Justice, and from one of the US banks through which Sprague sent some of the stolen funds; that bank filed a "suspicious activity report" and blocked Sprague's attempted transfer of funds to an account in Belize. The Justice Department, working closely with UC RUSAL and the FBI, filed charges in 2013 and Sprague pleaded guilty to one charge of transportation of stolen money. In March 2014 he was sentenced to 50 months imprisonment at Federal Correctional Institution, Lompoc in California. In an article from federal prison, Sprague states that, "After trying to live the life of an international fugitive under an adopted name on the Israeli Riviera — the home away from home for many disgraced Russian oligarchs — I eventually made my way to Malibu, where we owned a house bought in happier times, before my thefts, in anticipation of that longed-for day when we would finally escape Moscow."

== Activities ==
Sprague is an active blogger on his prison blogs, entitled Diary of a Wimpy Con. There, he writes about his experiences with the criminal justice system and his thoughts and feelings about his actions, his downfall and his life as a convicted felon. He has also published articles in other magazines and online publications, including Politico and AND Magazine.

Since serving his sentence, Sprague has accompanied Hank Shea, a former assistant U.S. Attorney who served as a federal prosecutor of white-collar crime and is currently a senior distinguished fellow at University of St. Thomas School of Law, speaking about his experiences to current students of business and law in hopes of helping them learn from his mistakes.
