= Samuel Sprague =

Captain in the American Revolutionary War

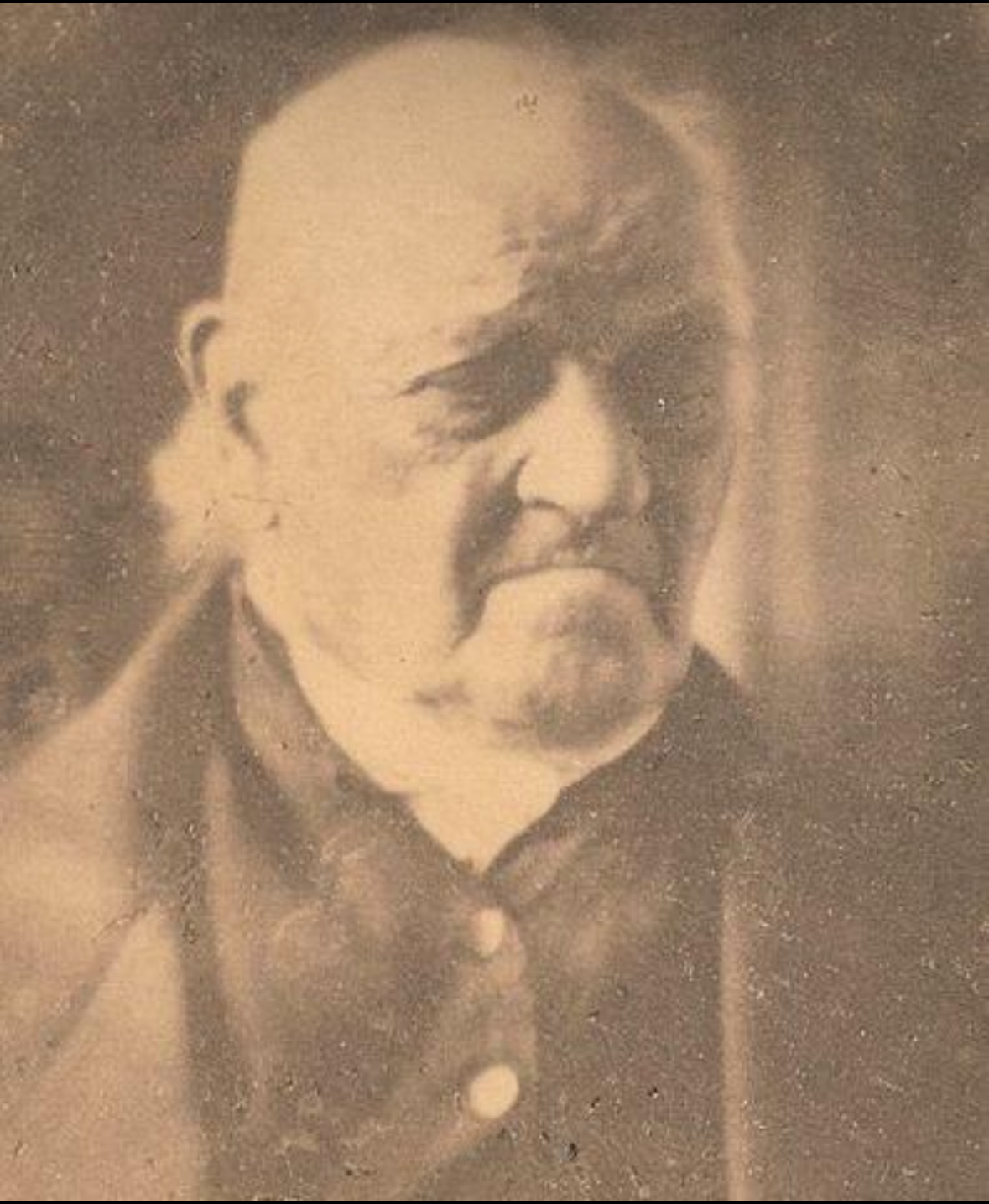
- An elderly Samuel Sprague in 1842 (aged 89)
- Born: December 22, 1753; Hingham, Massachusetts Bay
- Died: June 20, 1844 (aged 90); Boston, Massachusetts, U.S.
- Spouse: Joanna Thayer (m. 1778)
- Children: Charles Sprague
- Relatives: Sprague family
- Military career
- Branch: Continental Army
- Service years: 1775-1783
- Rank: Captain
- Conflicts: Boston Tea Party; American Revolutionary War; Siege of Boston; Battle of Trenton; Battle of Princeton

Samuel Sprague (December 27, 1753 – June 20, 1844) was a participant in the Boston Tea Party, a captain in the American Revolutionary War, and the father of the poet Charles Sprague.

== Ancestry ==
Samuel Sprague's Paternal ancestry traces its roots to England and Samuel's first ancestor in America was William Sprague (1609–1675), who immigrated in mid-July 1629. His maternal ancestry traced its roots to James Whiton of Hook Norton (1624–1710), who immigrated to America so time prior to 1647. Notably on April 19, 1676, a band of Native Americans burned Whiton's home down in Hingham.

== Early life ==
Samuel Sprague was born in Hingham, Massachusetts to Jeremiah Sprauge Jr. (1714–1777) and Elizabeth Whiton (1719–1800). Jeremiah was a weaver and constable and Elizabeth was a stay-at-home mother. Samuel moved to Boston and worked as a mason's apprentice for a mason named Etheredge.

=== Boston Tea Party ===
On December 16, 1773, when Samuel was 19-years-old, he took part in the Boston Tea Party and told the following story: "That evening, while on my way to visit the young woman [Joanna Thayer] I afterwards married, I met some lads hurrying along towards Griffin's wharf, who told me there was something going on there. I joined them, and on reaching the wharf found the Indians busy with the tea chests. Wishing to have my share in the fun, I looked about for the means of disguising myself. Spying a low building, with a stove-pipe by way of chimney, I climbed the roof and obtained a quantity of soot, with which I blackened my face. Joining the party, I recognized among them Mr. Etheredge, my master. We worked together, but neither of us ever afterwards alluded to each other's share in the proceedings."

== American Revolutionary War ==
Samuel was mustered on August 1, 1775, and participated in the American Revolution and fought at Siege of Boston, fought under General George Washington at Trenton and Princeton. During the Revolution, he met Joanna Thayer whom he married on July 9, 1778.

== Post-War ==
Following his service, Samuel received a pension of $15.00 on March 4, 1831. Before his death, he was photographed in 1842 by an unknown photographer. On June 20, 1844, Samuel died aged 90.
