= Charles Sprague (poet) =

American poet

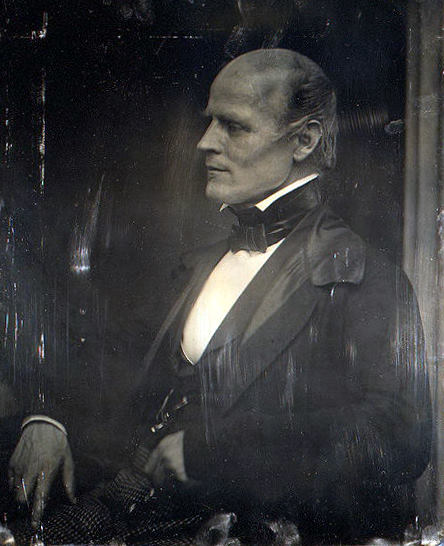
- Daguerreotype of Charles Sprague by Southworth & Hawes, c. 1850
- Born: October 26, 1791; Boston, Massachusetts, U.S.
- Died: January 22, 1875 (aged 83); Boston, Massachusetts, U.S.
- Resting place: Central Burying Ground
- Occupation: Poet
- Spouse: Elizabeth Rand (m. 1813)
- Children: Charles James Sprague
- Relatives: Sprague family

Signature
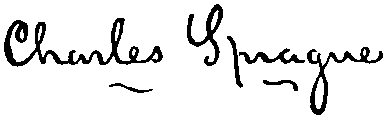

Charles Sprague (October 26, 1791 – January 22, 1875) was an early American poet. He worked for 45 years for the State and Globe Banks and was often referred to as the "Banker Poet of Boston". His odes and prologues won several competitive prizes and were collected and published in 1841 as The Writings of Charles Sprague.

== Personal life ==
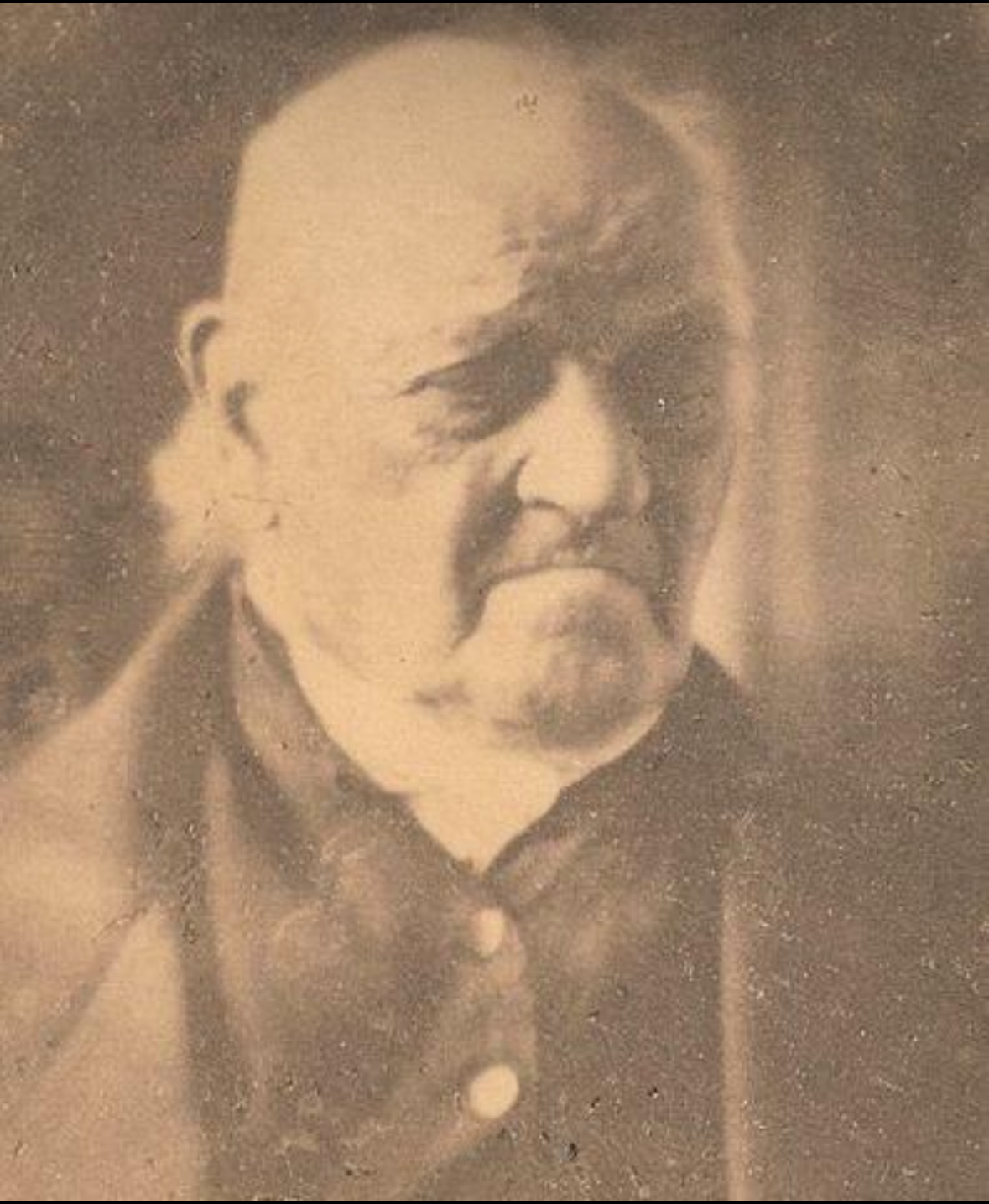
Sprague’s father, Samuel

He was born in Boston on October 26, 1791, to Samuel Sprague (1753–1844), and Joanna Thayer (1756–1848). He was a descendant of some of America's founding fathers, including his father, Samuel (participant in the Boston Tea Party and Revolutionary War), Richard Warren (Mayflower passenger) and the Reverend Peter Hobart and William Sprague of Hingham. He received a common-school education, beginning at age 10 at the Franklin School in Boston. He was taught by Dr. Asa Bullard and Mr. Lemuel Shaw who later became Chief Justice of the Massachusetts Supreme Judicial Court. He lost the use of his left eye by an accident at age 10.

His formal education ended at thirteen when he was apprenticed to a dry goods merchant, Messrs Thayer and Hunt. Here he gained his first practical knowledge of business. Later he formed a co-partnership with William B. Collander in the grocery business. He married Elizabeth Rand in 1813 and had four children, two dying in childhood. In 1819, he began working for the State Bank as a teller and when the Globe Bank was established in 1824 was employed there as a cashier. He remained there, becoming an officer in the institution, until 1865 and was often referred to as the "Banker Poet" of Boston. He resigned his bank position, when at 73 years and growing infirm with age, he didn't want to undertake the labors of a new regime of banking under national laws. He enjoyed the comforts of home life, surrounded by his books, until January 22, 1875, when after a short illness he died at 83.

== Poet ==
His first recognition for poetry came when he won a prize for the best prologue at the opening of the Park Theater in New York City. His first printed efforts were published in the Centennial, Boston Gazette, and The Evening Gazette as early as 1811. Upon the occasion of the triumphal entry of Lafayette into Boston, in 1824, he wrote the inscription for an arch that hung over the streets of Boston.

Many of Charles Sprague's poems were delivered at public festivities — major, historical Boston events — including Curiosity, delivered at Phi Beta Kappa society of Harvard University in 1829. This is his longest and most elaborate work. In the Salem Observer, August 29, 1829, it is noted that at the commencement at Harvard an honorary degree of Master of Arts was given to Mr. Charles Sprague, the poet. It goes on to state, "We are glad that the distributors of the literary honors of old Harvard are so discriminating in the selection of the candidates for their favors". This was quite an accomplishment as his formal education ended at thirteen and he was the epitome of a 'self-made man. "Shakespeare Ode" was delivered at a Boston theatre in a pageant in honor of Shakespeare, in 1823; "Ode" was pronounced at the Centennial Celebration of the Settlement of Boston of 1830; "Triennial Ode" at the Massachusetts Charitable Assoc. 1818; "Fifty Years Ago" at the Fourth of July Celebration, and "Song" at a festival in Faneuil Hall.

== Legacy ==
His children, Charles James Sprague (who became Curator of botany at the Boston Society of Natural History) and Mary Anna Sprague both married and had children. The families creative and productive talents continued on through his grandsons. His namesake, Charles Sprague Pearce, was a noted expatriate artist who resided in Paris. He is best known or a series of lunettes, paintings that he was commissioned to do for the Library of Congress in 1896. Another grandson, William Houghton Sprague Pearce (W.H.S. Pearce) worked for the New England Mutual Life Insurance company for over fifty years and painted local landscapes. He lived in Newton and often provided the artwork for the New England Mutual yearly calendar.
