= Charles James Sprague =

American botanist

Charles James Sprague (January 16, 1823, Boston – August 5, 1903, Hingham, Massachusetts) was a bank official, author, poet, musician, and botanist, specializing in lichenology.

Charles James Sprague, whose father was the poet Charles Sprague (1791–1875), followed his father into the banking business. For many years Charles J. Sprague contributed poems and articles to periodicals. In the 1850s and 1860s he was a curator in botany for the Boston Society of Natural History.

He was an intimate friend of the late Dr. Asa Gray, to whose collections he contributed many valuable specimens and critical notes. Like the late Edwin Faxon, Mr. Sprague was more anxious to aid others in their investigations than to publish the results of his own patient and critical observations. Realizing the importance of specialization he directed his attention chiefly to the lichens. His valuable collection ... has for some time been property of the Boston Society of Natural History.

From 1874 to 1880 Cyrus G. Pringle collected lichens for Sprague's herbarium.

In 1856 Charles J. Sprague was elected a fellow of the American Academy of Arts and Sciences. He married Amelia Stodder in 1847, they had 2 children. His herbarium is now at Boston's Museum of Science.
