= Nathan Turner Sprague =

American politician

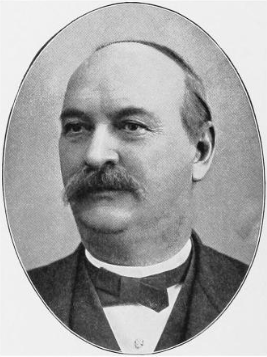
- Born: June 23, 1828; Mount Holly, Vermont, US
- Died: May 23, 1903 (aged 74); Brooklyn, New York, US
- Occupations: Businessman, banker, politician
- Political party: Republican
- Spouses: Minerva Hull; Melinda J. Evans; Elizabeth Harrison

Nathan Turner Sprague (June 22, 1828 – May 23, 1903) was a businessman, banker and Republican state legislator from Brandon, Vermont, who for many years maintained a home in Brooklyn and had extensive business interests there. He served in the Vermont legislature representing the Brandon District and in the Vermont Senate, representing Rutland County, Vermont. He funded the Sprague Centennial Library in Brandon. He established the Sprague National Bank in Brooklyn and purchased the North Western & Florida railroad in 1889.

== Biography ==
Nathan Turner Sprague was born in Mount Holly on June 22, 1828. His father had a similar name and was also prominent including as a politician in Vermont.

He was twice a widower, marrying Minerva Hull, Melinda J. Evans, and Elizabeth Harrison.

He died May 23, 1903, in his Brooklyn home. A funeral service was held for him there, and another later in Brandon, where he was buried at Pine Hill Cemetery.
