= William Sprague (American settler) =

William Sprague (October 26, 1609 – October 26, 1675 in Hingham, Massachusetts Bay Colony) left England on the ship Lyon's Whelp for Plymouth/Salem Massachusetts. He was originally from Upwey, near Weymouth, Dorset, England.

Sprague arrived at Naumkeag (Salem) in mid-July 1629 with his brothers Ralph and Richard. They were employed by Governor Endecott to explore and take possession of the country westward. They explored the land to (present day) Charlestown, Massachusetts, between the Mystic and Charles rivers, where they made peace with the local Indians. On February 10, 1634, the order creating a Board of Selectmen was passed, and Richard and William Sprague signed it.

Sprague lived in Charlestown until 1636, before moving to Hingham, where he was one of the first planters. His house lot, on Union St. "over the river" was said to be the pleasantest lot in Hingham. He was active in public affairs, and was Constable, Fence Viewer, etc. Sprague’s will names his wife, Millicent (Eames), and children, Anthony, Samuel, William, Joan, Jonathan, Persis, Johanna and Mary.

Other Sprague relatives became soldiers in the American Revolutionary War and two of them, William Sprague III and William Sprague IV, became governors of the state of Rhode Island.

Lucille Ball and her brother, Fred Ball, were direct descendants.
