= William Greene III =

American politician

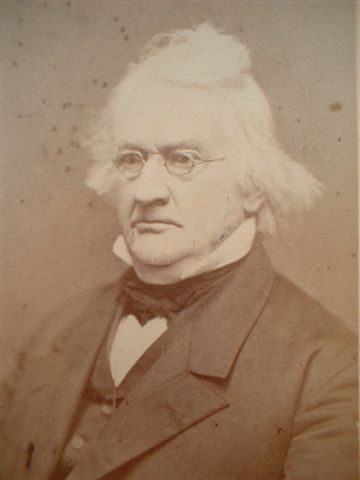
- Greene in 1870

42nd Lieutenant Governor of Rhode Island
- In office 1866–1868
- Governor: Ambrose Burnside
- Preceded by: Duncan Pell
- Succeeded by: Pardon Stevens

Personal details
- Born: January 1, 1797 Warwick, Rhode Island, U.S.
- Died: March 24, 1883 (aged 86) Warwick, Rhode Island, U.S.
- Resting place: Governor Greene Cemetery, Love Lane, Warwick
- Spouse(s): Abby Bracket Lyman (m. 1821) Caroline Brenton Burge
- Relations: William Greene Jr. (grandfather); William Greene Sr. (great-grandfather); John Greene Jr. (ancestor)
- Children: 2
- Parent: Ray Greene (father)
- Occupation: Deputy governor

William Greene III (January 1, 1797 – March 24, 1883) was a lieutenant governor of the state of Rhode Island, serving for two years shortly after the American Civil War.

== Life ==
From a prominent Rhode Island family, Greene was the son of United States Senator and Rhode Island Attorney General Ray Greene and his wife Mary M. Flagg. Greene was also the grandson of the second governor of the state, William Greene, Jr. who served for several years during the American Revolutionary War, and the great grandson of William Greene, Sr. who served 11 one-year terms as a colonial governor of Rhode Island. Greene also descends from John Greene, Jr. who served for ten years as deputy governor of the Rhode Island colony, from Warwick founders John Greene, Sr., Samuel Gorton, and Randall Holden, and from Frances (Latham) Dungan, the "mother of governors."

Greene graduated from Brown University and studied law at Litchfield in Connecticut. Following this he went to Ohio about 1820, and spent more than four decades there, promoting the Cincinnati public schools and roads. Greene delivered a Phi Beta Kappa Address at Brown in 1851, which supported the Fugitive Slave Act of 1850 and criticized those who violated the law (abolitionists). He returned to Warwick in 1862, and was selected as Rhode Island's Lieutenant Governor in 1866, under Governor Ambrose Burnside, shortly after the Civil War. He served for two years.

Greene died in Warwick in 1883 and was buried in the Governor Greene Cemetery where his father, grandfather, and great grandfather are all buried, along with their wives.

== Family ==
Greene was married in 1821 to Abby Bracket Lyman, the daughter of Erastus Lyman, and the couple had two daughters: Catharine Ray Greene (1824-1864) and Anna Jean Greene (1827-1831). He married second Caroline Brenton Burge.

== Sources ==
=== Bibliography ===
- Austin, John Osborne (1887). Genealogical Dictionary of Rhode Island. Albany, New York: J. Munsell's Sons. ISBN 978-0-8063-0006-1.
- Turner, Henry Edward (1877). Greenes of Warwick in Colonial History. Davis & Pitman, Steam Printers.

== See also ==
- Ray Greene for his paternal ancestry

Political offices
| Preceded by Duncan Pell | Lieutenant Governor of Rhode Island; 1866–1868 | Succeeded by Duncan Stevens |
