= Governor Green =

Governor Green or Greene may refer to:

- Sir Charles Green, 1st Baronet (1749–1831), Civil Governor of Grenada
- Dwight H. Green (1897–1958), 30th Governor of Illinois
- Fred W. Green (1871–1936), 31st Governor of Michigan
- Josh Green (politician) (born 1970), 9th Governor of Hawaii
- Nehemiah Green (1837–1890), 4th Governor of Kansas
- Robert Stockton Green (1831–1890), 27th Governor of New Jersey
- Theodore F. Green (1867–1966), 57th Governor of Rhode Island
- Thomas Greene (governor) (1609–1651), 2nd Proprietary Governor of Maryland
- Warren Green (South Dakota politician) (1869–1945), 13th Governor of South Dakota
- William Greene Jr. (1731–1809), 2nd Governor of Rhode Island
- William Greene (colonial governor) (1695–1758), 23rd, 25th, 27th, and 29th Governor of the Colony of Rhode Island and Providence Plantations

== See also ==
- Governor Greene Cemetery, Rhode Island
