= Ray Greene (politician) =

American politician (1765–1849)

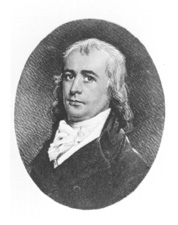

United States Senator from Rhode Island
- In office November 13, 1797 – March 5, 1801
- Preceded by: William Bradford
- Succeeded by: Christopher Ellery

44th Attorney General of Rhode Island
- In office 1794–1797
- Governor: Arthur Fenner
- Preceded by: William Channing
- Succeeded by: James Burrill Jr.

Personal details
- Born: February 2, 1765 Warwick, Rhode Island
- Died: January 11, 1849 (aged 83) Warwick, Rhode Island, US
- Resting place: Governor Greene Cemetery, Love Lane, Warwick
- Party: Federalist
- Education: Yale College, 1784

Ray Greene (February 2, 1765 – January 11, 1849) was a United States senator and Attorney General of Rhode Island during the early days of statehood.

== Life ==
Born in Warwick, Rhode Island, Greene was a son of William Greene Jr. and Catharine Ray. His father was a governor of Rhode Island during the American Revolutionary War, and his mother was a correspondent of Benjamin Franklin. Greene pursued classical studies and graduated from Yale College in 1784, then studied law, was admitted to the bar, and commenced practice in Providence. He was attorney general of Rhode Island from 1794 to 1797, and in the latter year was elected as a Federalist to the United States Senate to fill the vacancy caused by the resignation of William Bradford. Greene was reelected in 1799 and in total served from November 13, 1797, to March 5, 1801, when he resigned, having been nominated for a judicial position. He was designated a district judge of Rhode Island by President John Adams, but, through a technicality, was not appointed.

== Family ==
Greene married in Charleston, South Carolina, on July 23, 1794, Mary Magdalene Flagg (1775–1817), the daughter of George Flagg and Mary Magdalene Henderson of Charleston. The couple had five children, the oldest of whom was George Turner Greene (1795–1821) followed by William Greene III who became a Lieutenant Governor of Rhode Island in the late 1860s. Their third child, Catharine Ray Greene (1799–1875) married in 1815 Dr. James Varnum Turner; Mary Elizabeth (born 1804) died as a youngster; and Isabella Mary (1805–1863) married in 1833 Joseph S. Jenckes.

== Ancestry ==
Greene's grandfather was colonial governor William Greene Sr., and both his father and mother, who were second cousins, descend from early colonial deputy governor John Greene Jr. Ray Greene also descends from several early Rhode Island settlers, including Warwick founders John Greene Sr., Samuel Gorton, and Randall Holden, and Providence founder Roger Williams.

Ancestors of Ray Greene (politician)

16. John Greene Jr. (1620 - 1708)
8. Samuel Greene (1671 - 1720)
17. Ann Almy (1627 - 1709)
4. William Greene Sr. (1695 - 1758)
18. Benjamin Gorton (died 1699)
9. Mary Gorton (1673 - 1732)
19. Sarah Carder (died 1724)
2. William Greene Jr. (1731 - 1809)
20. Thomas Greene (1628 - 1717)
10. Benjamin Greene (1666 - 1757)
21. Elizabeth Barton (died 1693)
5. Catharine Greene (b. 1695)
22. Randall Holden (1612 - 1692)
11. Susannah Holden (1670 - 1734)
23. Frances Dungan (c. 1630 - 1697)
1. Ray Greene (1765 - 1849)
24. Simon Ray (born 1610)
12. Simon Ray (1638 - 1737)
25. Mary Rowning (born 1613)
6. Simon Ray (1672 - 1755)
26. Nathaniel Thomas (born 1606)
13. Mary Thomas
27. Mary
3. Catherine Ray (1731 - 1794)
28. John Greene Jr. (1620 - 1708)
14. Job Greene (1656 - 1745)
29. Ann Almy (1627 - 1709)
7. Deborah Greene (1690 - 1763)
30. John Sayles (died 1681)
15. Phebe Sayles (1658 - 1744)
31. Mary Williams (1633 - 1684)

Legal offices
Preceded by William Channing	Attorney General of Rhode Island; 1794–1797	Succeeded by James Burrill Jr.
U.S. Senate
Preceded by William Bradford	U.S. senator (Class 2) from Rhode Island; 1797–1801; Served alongside: Theodore Foster	Succeeded by Christopher Ellery
