= Catharine Littlefield Greene =

American scientist

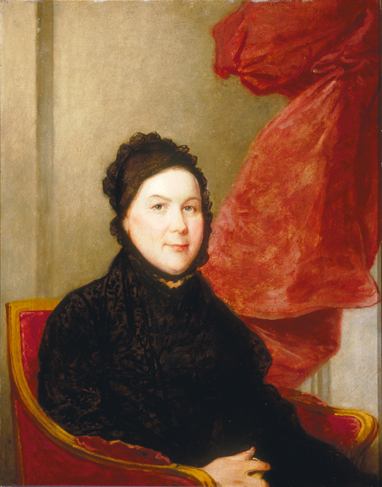
- James Frothingham, Catharine Littlefield Greene Miller, Telfair Museum of Art, Savannah, Georgia
- Born: Catharine Littlefield; February 17, 1755; New Shoreham, Colony of Rhode Island and Providence Plantations
- Died: September 2, 1814 (aged 59); Cumberland Island, Georgia
- Other name: Catharine Miller
- Spouses: Nathanael Greene (m. 1774; died 1786) Phineas Miller (m. 1796; died 1803)
- Children: 5

Catharine "Caty" Littlefield Greene (February 17, 1755 – September 2, 1814) was an American patriot who traveled to her husband, Continental Army General Nathanael Greene's, encampments during the American Revolutionary War. She entertained and comforted the soldiers, officers, and officer's wives. During that time she had four children and a fifth after the end of the war. Greene followed her husband, regardless of cold weather or illness in the camps, notably spending the winter at Valley Forge.

During the war, Nathanael signed promissory notes for clothing and food for his soldiers in South Carolina. He was not repaid during his lifetime and through a chain of events the debt-ridden Greenes moved to Georgia to operate a rice plantation, relying on enslaved workers. They moved from the north to the plantation with Phineas Miller, the children's tutor. After Nathanael's death in 1786, Miller, successfully ran the plantation for a time. With the help of her friend Alexander Hamilton, arrangements were made with the federal government to repay the money that Nathanael spent to take care of his troops. Greene married Miller at the home of her friends, George and Martha Washington, in Philadelphia, in 1796.

She was a noted supporter of the inventor Eli Whitney. Her "extraordinary activity of mind, and tact in seizing on points, so as to apprehend almost intuitively, distinguished her through life. It enabled her, without apparent mental effort, to apply the instruction conveyed in the books she read, to the practical affairs of life".

== Early life ==
Catharine ("Caty") Littlefield was born on February 17, 1755, (Note: Ellet and Stegeman state that Greene was born in 1753, and Berkin said she was born in 1756, but the record of her birth states she was born February 17, 1755.) off the coast of Rhode Island Colony on Block Island, where her mother's family were among the first settlers in the 1660s. She was born into an upper-class family; her father John Littlefield was a member of the Rhode Island legislature. Catharine was the second of five children born to John and Phebe (née Ray) Littlefield.

Catharine spent her early childhood years with her family on Block Island, where she learned to ride a horse at a young age. There were no conveniences of villages or small towns, no schools or stores. The only public building was a meetinghouse. Her mother Phebe died on April 30, 1761. She was buried in the Block Island Old Burial Ground in May. (Note: Several sources state that Catharine's mother died when she was 10, but Phebe Ray Littlefield's death was on September 27, 1761, which would have meant that Catharine (born February 17, 1755), was 6 years and 7 months old at the time of her mother's death.)

The Governor Greene Mansion, East Greenwich

At age ten, Catharine and her younger sister were sent to live in East Greenwich with Catharine ("Kitty") Ray and William Greene, her aunt and uncle. Both of her caretakers were active in local government and acquainted her with its inner workings. Her uncle was later the Governor of Rhode Island (1778–1786). Catharine received a formal education and lessons of domesticity. Among the household's visitors were her aunt's friend Benjamin Franklin, and her uncle's relative Nathanael Greene. Catharine corresponded with Franklin, his sister Jane Franklin Mecom, and his daughter Sarah Franklin Bache beginning in 1765, a habit that continued until 1790. (Note: Catharine Littlefield Greene Miller's writings have been confused by authors and historians with those of her aunt Catharine Ray Greene, as both were known as Catharine Greene for long periods of their lives.)

Catharine had a happy childhood, enjoying dancing and riding. She visited family at Block Island, where Nathanael would meet her and enjoy dancing with her. She had a quick, curious mind and enjoyed a multitude of topics, which made her "one of the most brilliant and entertaining of women", according to Elizabeth F. Ellet.

== Marriage to Nathanael Greene ==
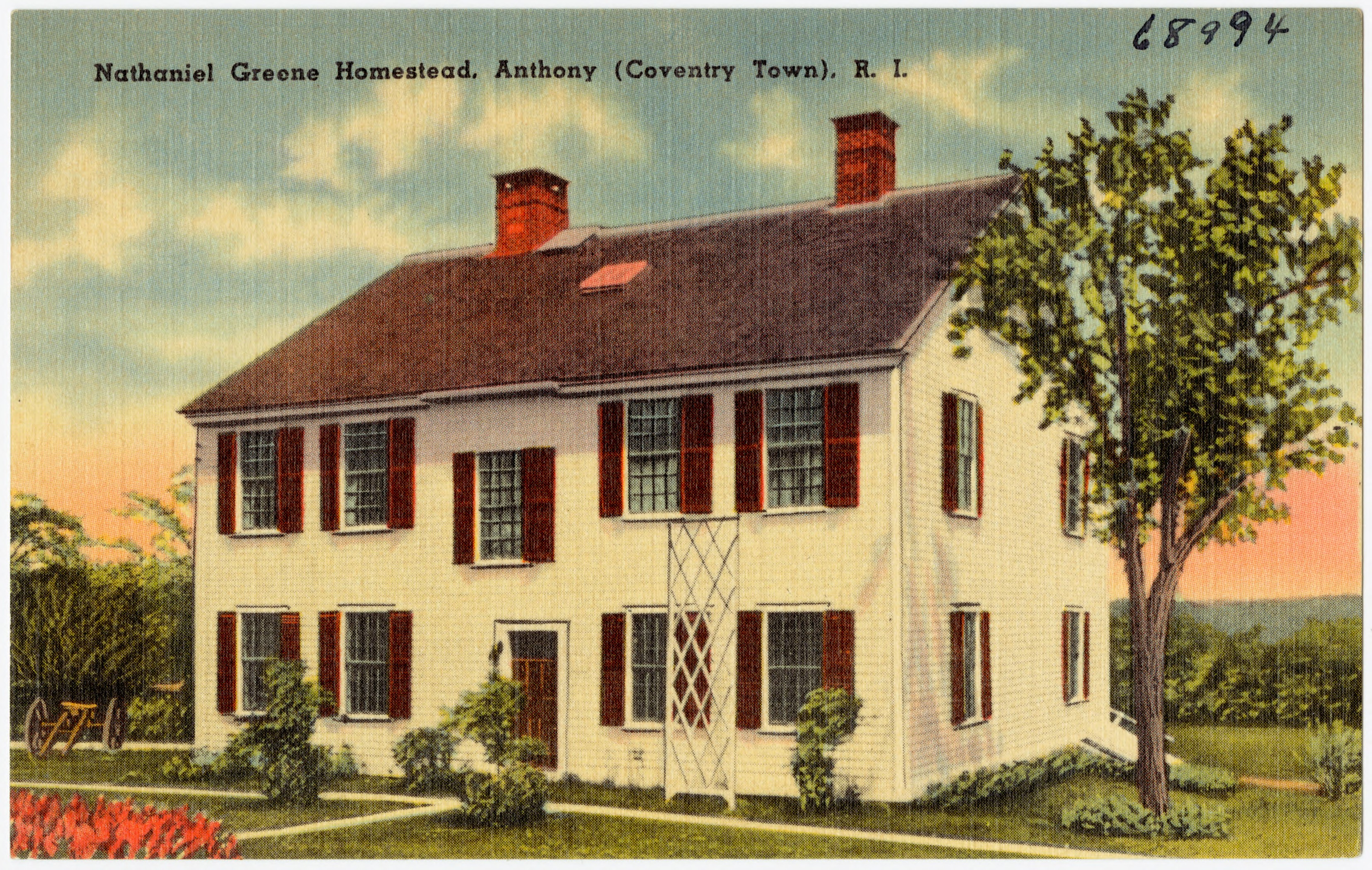
Nathanael Greene Homestead, Anthony, Coventry Town, Rhode Island, built in 1770, photograph between about 1930 and 1945, Tichnor Brothers collection, Boston Public Library

Beginning in 1772, Catharine was courted by Nathanael Greene, a fellow Rhode Islander, who was 12 years and six months her senior. (Note: Their age difference is stated as 13 or 14 years, but she was born on February 17, 1755, and Nathanael was born August 7, 1742, making the difference 12 and a half years.) He was a merchant and a foundry worker. Catharine married Nathanael on July 20, 1774, becoming Catharine Littlefield Greene. She expected a comfortable life with her husband in Coventry, Rhode Island.

=== Revolutionary war ===
==== The beginning of the war ====
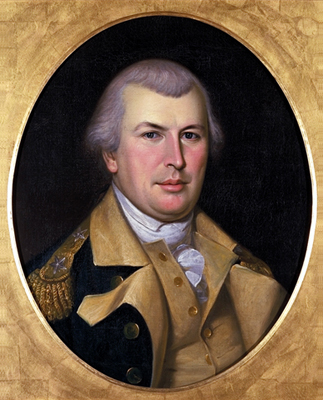
Charles Willson Peale, Nathanael Greene, 1783

After the initial Battles of Lexington and Concord of the American Revolutionary War (April 19, 1775 – September 3, 1783), Nathanael was made a brigadier general in the Continental Army and commander of Rhode Island's three regiments. He was a patriot fighting against the British. A Quaker, Nathanael was banned from attending meetings after he served as a colonial legislator and an officer in the military. Curious about the war, the pregnant Greene rode for a full day by horse and buggy from her home in Coventry to meet up with Nathanael at the American Army camp in Massachusetts.

==== An officer's wife ====
Greene spent some of her time at home and managed their business, but spent as much time as she could at military camps or at his headquarters, in housing that Nathanael arranged near where he was during the war. She saw many of the battles, including those in Boston, Philadelphia, New York, and Charleston. Against her husband's wishes, Greene stayed near his headquarters and encampments as much as she could after she had their first child in 1776.

Greene formed a camaraderie with others her husband was stationed with, often the one responsible for planning social events for the troops to have respite. She became friends of Lucy Flucker Knox, Alexander Hamilton, Martha and George Washington, and other officers and their wives. Martha spent the winters in her husband's encampments, including Valley Forge and Boston. Lucy often stayed near her husband during the winter. Wives of officers had assistance, whether servants, slaves, or, if necessary, assigned soldiers.

Officer's wives organized dinner parties, dances, and balls for officers. Nathanael wrote that "we had a little dance at my headquarters ... Upon the whole we had a pretty little frisk" in March 1779. Greene danced with General George Washington at Valley Forge and for three hours at Middlebrook. Alexander Hamilton met his wife Elizabeth Schuyler at an event.

According to author Mary Ellen Snodgrass, "she kept up intense scrutiny of military politics" and corresponded with Thomas Jefferson, Alexander Hamilton, and Henry Knox, the secretary of war. She also communicated with Martha Washington.

==== Philadelphia and New Jersey ====
Greene stayed at Valley Forge during the winter, living in a small hut, or a house "far more elegant" than where Nathanael was housed. Greene's lodging, 3 miles (4.8 km) from the main camp at Valley Forge, was used to entertain officers, including Jeremiah Wadsworth and Anthony Wayne. She was visited by soldiers "in turn", who were suffering from cold and hunger and they received comfort, kindness, and cheer by her fireside. She lived among sickness, cold weather, suffering, and moments of joy, which endeared her to the soldiers and officers.

In her various yearly efforts to join her husband, little seemed to deter her. On the verge of childbirth ... Frightened of sailing, and in danger of capture by a British patrol boat, she nevertheless took a boat across the Long Island Sound to get to New York City before the British attack. Facing a long journey along rutted roads and several nights in shabby inns along the way, she climbed in her carriage with her son and traveled from Coventry to Philadelphia to meet her husband.

When Nathanael was encamped at Morristown, New Jersey, Greene stayed a year with the family of William Alexander, Lord Stirling, on their estate in Basking Ridge.

==== Newport, Rhode Island ====
Greene was in Newport, Rhode Island in 1780 and 1781, where the French General Jean-Baptiste Donatien de Vimeur, comte de Rochambeau, his officers, and troops were stationed. In December 1781, Greene visited George and Martha Washington in Philadelphia, before meeting up with her husband in the south in April 1782.

==== War in the south ====
During Nathanael's command in the South, he faced harsh conditions without sufficient supplies and money. In order to feed and clothe his soldiers during the winter, he personally guaranteed thousands of dollars to Charleston merchants. He later discovered that the speculator, John Banks, through whom he had dealt was fraudulent. At the end of the war, the merchants pressed him for payment on the notes, and judgments came down from South Carolina courts. He was without sufficient funds and heavily in debt. Congress stated that Nathanael secured the loans without authorization and would not pay any of the debt. Nathanael sold off his property in Rhode Island and moved his family to Georgia.

=== Motherhood during the war ===
When Greene followed her husband during the war, she gave birth to five children. In 1779, she had three children and was pregnant with their fourth child when Nathanael was made commander of George Washington's southern forces. Greene was not able to join her husband in Charleston, South Carolina, until 1781. She split her time between staying with him at his headquarters and on the islands that gave her respite from the heat. By this time, her children were George, Martha, Cornelia, and baby Nathanael Ray. Their fifth child, born by the end of the war, was Louisa. They had two more daughters who died shortly after they were born.

- George Washington was born by February 1776, the place and date are unknown. He went with his mother to Nathanael's headquarters at Prospect Hill near Boston to help him recover from a bad case of jaundice. She stayed there until the end of the Siege of Boston campaign (April 19, 1775 – March 17, 1776).
- Martha "Patty" Washington, born on March 14, 1777, in Potowamut (Nathanael's hometown). Greene, ill with pneumonia, was delayed several months in meeting up with Nathanael in New Jersey. Greene and her two children traveled over very difficult roads for four days to avoid the British and Tories. They ultimately made it to Abraham Lott's estate, Beaverwyck, in New Jersey, where she met up with Nathanael. Greene remained in Basking Ridge, staying on the estate of William Alexander, Lord Stirling for a year.
- Cornelia Lott was born in 1779 when Nathanael and his troops where camped out at their house and grounds in Coventry. Nathanael, concerned about Greene's health, received approval for a leave from Washington so that he could attend to his wife while his troops marched to New York. Cornelia was born fragile and sickly, and it was not clear that she was going to live. When she began getting stronger, Nathanael returned to his soldiers.
- Nathanael "Nat" Ray was born in January 1780 at her husband's encampment at Morristown, New Jersey. A few weeks before her due date she traveled through a frigid snowstorm with her son George, but she left the girls behind. Patty was on Block Island with Greene's father and Cornelia was with Nathanael's family in Potowamut. Greene gathered her three children and the new baby to Coventry in the summer of 1780.
- Louisa was born about March 1784 (Note: Louisa was born when her brother Nat (born 1780) was at least age 3. The baby was born after Nathanael was with George Washington in New York City for Washington's farewell to his generals (November 16, 1783). She was born about the time Nathanael had sent his children to family member's homes for the baby's birth. Billy Littlefield wrote of his experiences taking care of Nat in the month of March. Baby Louisa was born before Nathanael traveled south to inspect their property in Georgia. He set off for Georgia in early 1785.) in Newport. Nathanael, with his family after the end of the war, sent their children to visit relatives for the birth of the baby.
- Catharine was born in Newport, after Louisa and by August 1785. A few of the children had whooping cough, but they survived. Baby Catharine had it too. Her throat closed up and she died. Greene became despondent, ill, and pregnant again by the fall of 1785. Realizing she was pregnant again, Greene collapsed and required nursing care.
- A baby girl was born early April 1786 at Mulberry Plantation after Greene had an accidental fall. The premature baby died shortly after it was born.

Green was a strict parent, and "none of her children ever thought of disobeying her". She also enjoyed playing with them. When the war ended, Greene looked forward to having Nathanael home to share in the responsibility of raising the children and handling business and household affairs. His presence at home "brought a peace of mind unknown to her since the conflict began." With his return to the family as a whole, Nathanael became a light-hearted parental figure, helping to share the burden of raising children, without strict discipline.

=== Recover funds from the war ===
At the urging of a trusted adviser, Greene personally presented to the United States Congress a petition for indemnity to recover funds that Nathanael had paid to Charleston merchants. On April 27, 1792, President George Washington approved and signed an act that indemnified the Greene estate.

In a happy letter to a friend, she wrote:

I can tell you my dear friend, that I am in good health and spirits and feel as saucy as you please—not only because I am independent, but because I have gained a complete triumph over some of my friends who did not wish me success—and others who doubted my judgement in managing the business and constantly tormented me to death to give up my obstinacy as it was called. They are now as mute as mice—Not a word dare they utter. O how sweet is revenge!

== Plantation ==
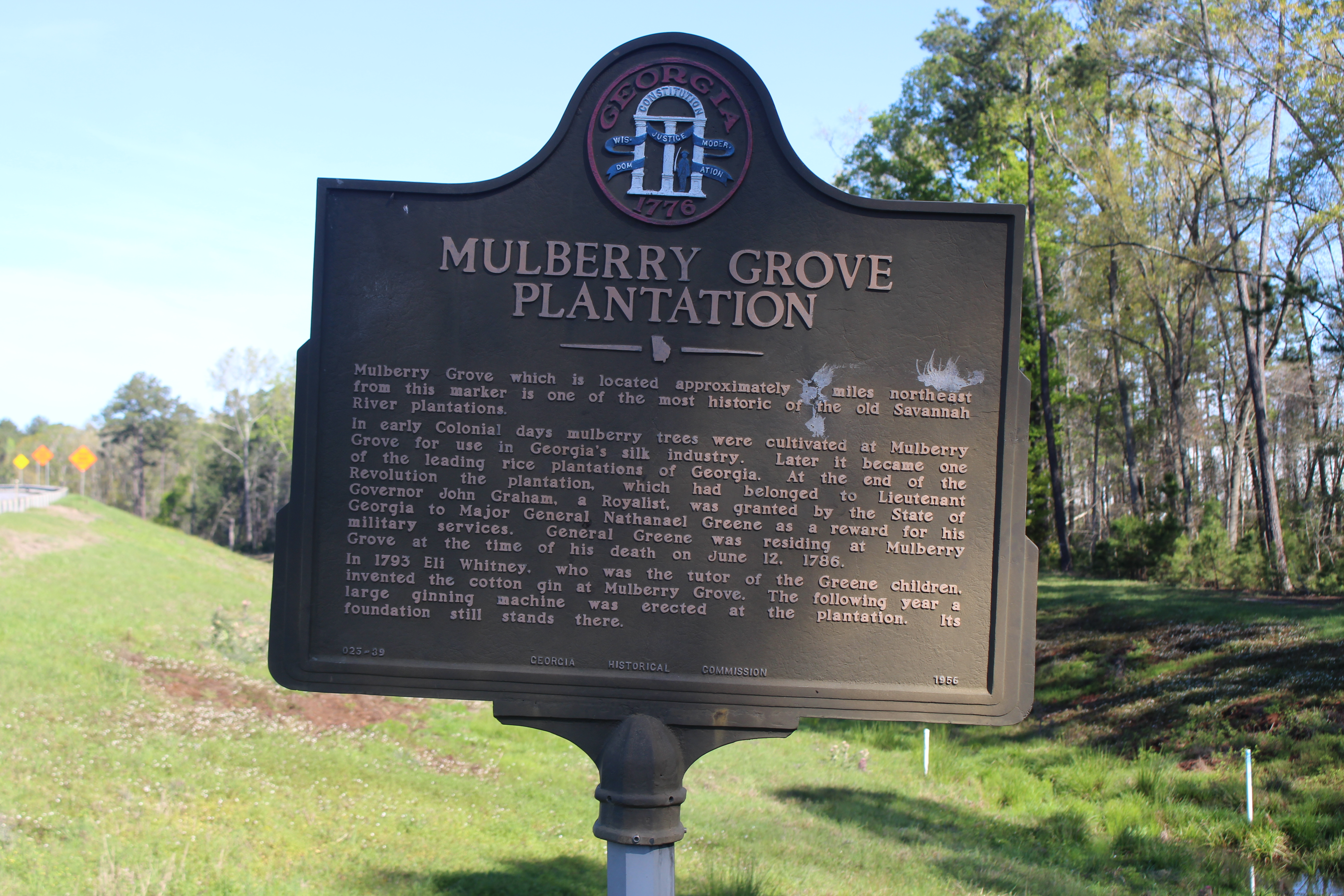
Historic marker for Mulberry Grove Plantation, Georgia

After the war, Nathanael was given land in Georgia and farm land in South Carolina for his military service. A slave plantation on the Savannah River called Mulberry Grove, in Chatham County, Georgia, was granted to him by the Georgia General Assembly in gratitude for his services during the war. Nathanael decided to move the family, with the children's tutor Phineas Miller, in the fall of 1785. Here, he hoped to make a living and pay off their debts from what they earned on their rice, produced with slave-labor. Nathanael set aside his anti-slavery beliefs to operate the plantation.

Greene, living on the frontier, far away from her family in Rhode Island, had to adjust to being the mistress of a struggling plantation. According to Stegeman, "her dream of wealth and leisure, once the war was over, had been shattered; she could no longer count on even the most basic security."

Greene saw her husband as a "tired, haggard ex-soldier who had given himself to a belief, had signed away his future life, in fact, for that cause." She earnestly ran the plantation house with their domestic enslaved people. She also got to know members of her community.

=== Nathanael's death ===
Nathanael died suddenly on June 19, 1786, of sunstroke. Greene assumed responsibility for managing the plantation. Nathanael still had debt from the war that needed to be paid off. Greene contacted all she knew who might be helpful and gained Alexander Hamilton's support to obtain the money from the government for the debt.

After her husband's death, Greene met the pressures of rearing her children and handling Nathanael's devastated finances. The children's tutor, Phineas Miller, became the plantation manager and Mulberry Grove flourished by 1788.

=== Cotton gin ===
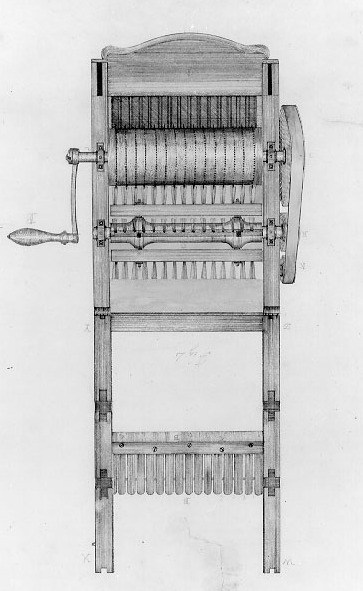
Drawing of Eli Whitney's cotton gin, circa 1795, original drawing by the United States Patent Office, courtesy of Textile Industry History

Greene met a young man named Eli Whitney, who tutored her neighbor's children, but soon lost interest in that occupation. He preferred to study law. With her encouragement he took up residence at Mulberry Grove and during that time he pursued his inventions, working in a room in the basement. Greene considered him a mechanical genius. Within a year he had produced a model for the cotton gin.

In an 1883 article in The North American Review titled "Woman as Inventor", the early feminist and abolitionist Matilda Joslyn Gage claimed that Mrs. Greene suggested to Whitney the use of a brush-like component, which was instrumental in separating the seeds from the cotton. Gage provided no source for this claim, and to date there has been no independent verification of Greene's role in the invention of the gin. Her daughter Cornelia Greene Skipwith Littlefield describes her mother's role in "perfecting" the cotton gin with Eli Whitney in a Century magazine article written by her granddaughter. The article also mentioned that she suggested using a brush to separate the seeds from the cotton.

=== Second marriage and later years ===
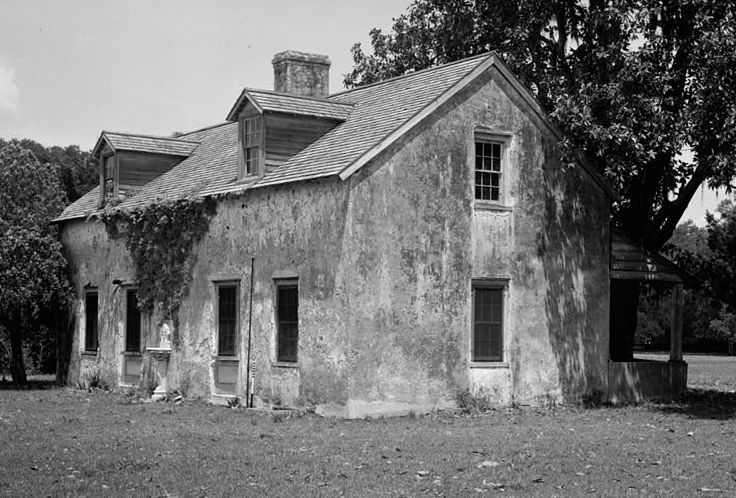
The Nathanael Greene Cottage, or Tabby House at Dungeness estate on Cumberland Island, southeast Georgia. Historic American Buildings Survey of Georgia.

Greene married Miller on June 13, 1796, in Philadelphia at the home of President and Martha Washington. After selling Mulberry Grove in 1798, Greene and Miller lived at Dungeness plantation on the southern end of Cumberland Island, on land that Nathanael was awarded. Miller died in 1803.

Aaron Burr showed up at the plantation after killing Green's friend, Alexander Hamilton, in the Burr–Hamilton duel (July 11, 1804). Unable to entertain the killer of her friend, she let him enter her home and she left. Greene returned when Burr was gone.

Greene died of malaria at the plantation on September 2, 1814, and she was buried there in the family cemetery.

== Bibliography ==
- Berkin, Carol (2006). Revolutionary mothers : women in the struggle for America's independence. New York: Vintage Books. ISBN 978-1-4000-7532-4.
- Stegeman, John F. (1986). Caty : a biography of Catharine Littlefield Greene. Athen: University of Georgia Press. ISBN 978-0-8203-0794-7.
