= John Greene (settler) =

English settler of the Colony of Rhode Island

John Greene Sr.
- Born: c. 1590; Bowridge Hill, Dorset, England
- Died: 7 January 1659 (aged 61); Warwick, Rhode Island
- Resting place: John Greene Cemetery, Warwick
- Occupations: Surgeon, deputy
- Spouses: Joan Tattershall; Alice Daniels Beggerley; Phillip (last name unknown)
- Children: 7, including John

John Greene Sr. (c. 1590 – 7 January 1659) was an early settler of the Colony of Rhode Island and Providence Plantations, one of the 12 original proprietors of Providence, and a co-founder of the town of Warwick in the colony, sailing from England with his family in 1635. He first settled in Salem in the Massachusetts Bay Colony, but he had difficulty with the Puritan authority and soon followed Roger Williams to Providence, becoming one of the original proprietors of that town. In 1643, he joined Samuel Gorton and ten others in purchasing land that became the town of Warwick. Difficulties with Massachusetts ensued, until he accompanied Gorton on a trip to England where they secured royal recognition of their town.

Once Warwick became safe from external threats, Greene became active in its government. He served on the town council, was Deputy to the General Court of the colony, and served as magistrate of the General Court of Trials. He died in the last days of 1658, being survived by his wife and six grown children, and becoming the ancestor of many prominent citizens.

== Early life ==
John Greene was likely born at Bowridge Hill a small hamlet near Gillingham, Dorset, England, and was the son of Richard Greene, whose father was also named Richard. He became a surgeon and moved to Salisbury, Wiltshire, England, where he was married at St Thomas in 1619 to Joane Tattersall (or Tatarsole) and where all of his children were baptized. On 6 April 1635, he and his family boarded the ship James at Southampton, England and sailed to New England, arriving in Boston on 3 June, and then going to Salem for a short while.

== Providence ==
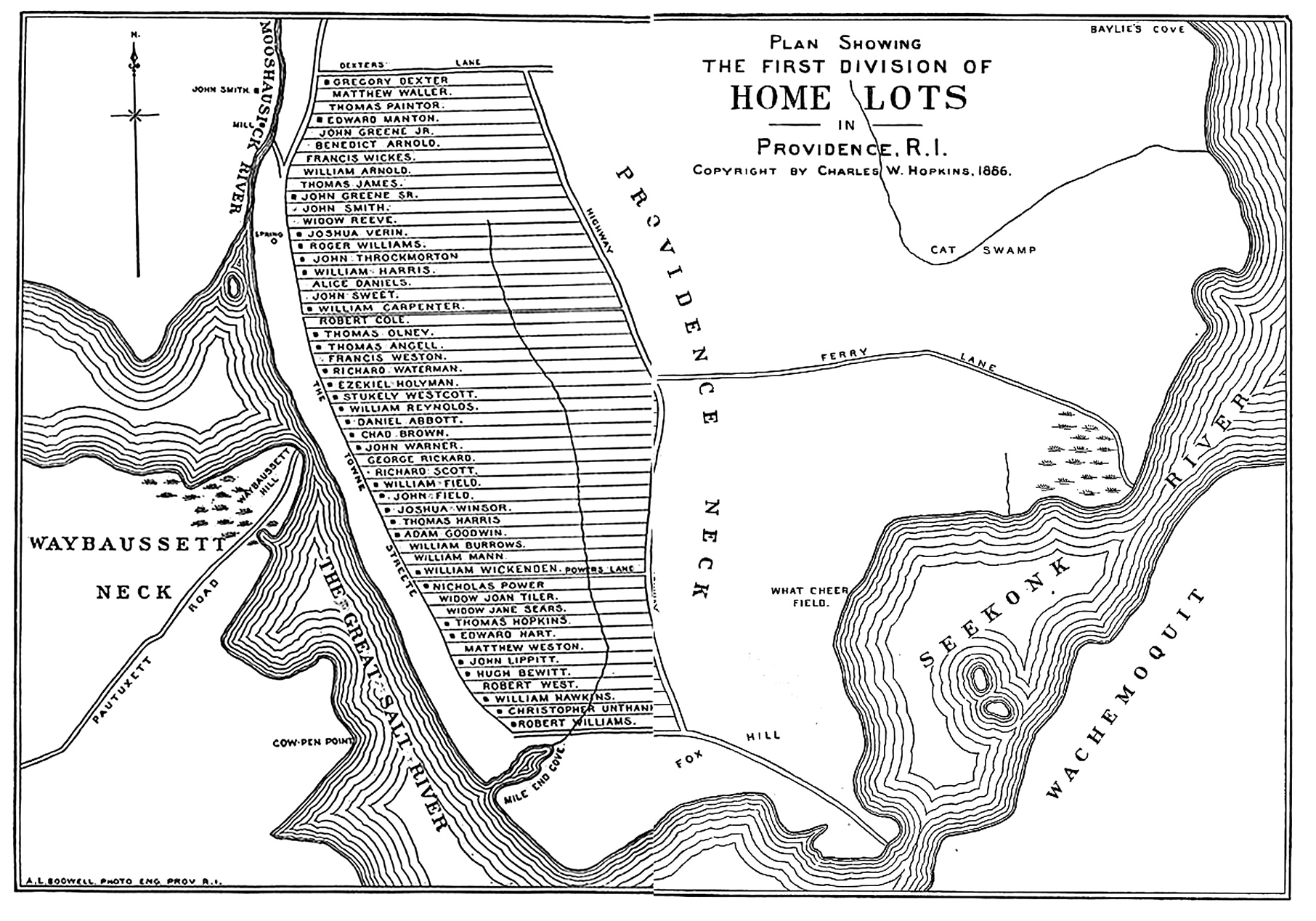
Town layout of Providence with Greene, Jr.'s lot fifth from the top and Greene, Sr.'s lot tenth from the top.

Greene was consistently resistant to the Puritan authority of the Massachusetts Bay Colony, and he moved to Providence with Roger Williams within a year or two of his arrival in New England. He used this sanctuary to write haranguing letters to Massachusetts, speaking contemptuously of the magistrates, and he was fined 20 pounds in September 1637 and ordered not to come into the jurisdiction of the Massachusetts colony. In 1638, he was one of the 12 persons to whom Roger Williams deeded land, becoming one of the original proprietors of that settlement. He was also one of the 12 original members of the First Baptist Church in America located there.

== Warwick ==
In October 1642, Greene bought a neck of land with a little island from Indian sachem Miantonomi and named the property Occupassuatuxet. This land remained in his family for the following 140 years. He became a close friend of Samuel Gorton, and they and ten others purchased another tract of land from Miantonomi in January 1643 and named it Shawomet, which later became the Warwick settlement.

The following September, many of these Shawomet settlers were summoned to appear in court in Massachusetts, based on charges of fraud brought against them from two minor Indian sachems. The settlers refused the summons, telling the court that Massachusetts Bay did not have jurisdiction over their land, in response to which soldiers were sent and several of the settlers were taken to Boston. Greene and his son John Jr. both escaped to Conanicut Island and were never captured.

Those who were taken to Massachusetts were tried, but they were not tried for the charges of fraud brought by the Indians. Instead, they stood trial concerning their theological beliefs, and several of them were convicted of blasphemy and incarcerated for those beliefs. They were released a few months later, then banished from Massachusetts—and also from their homes in Shawomet.

Greene, Gorton, and Randall Holden sailed to England seeking redress for the wrongs done to them, but they had to board a ship in New Amsterdam because they were banned from going to Boston. Gorton was able to get a royal decree for his settlement of Shawomet from the Earl of Warwick. Greene and Holden returned to New England with this important document in 1646, while Gorton remained in England for another two years. When he returned in 1648, he renamed the settlement "Warwick" in honor of the earl who helped him get the protection that they needed.

== Later life and family ==
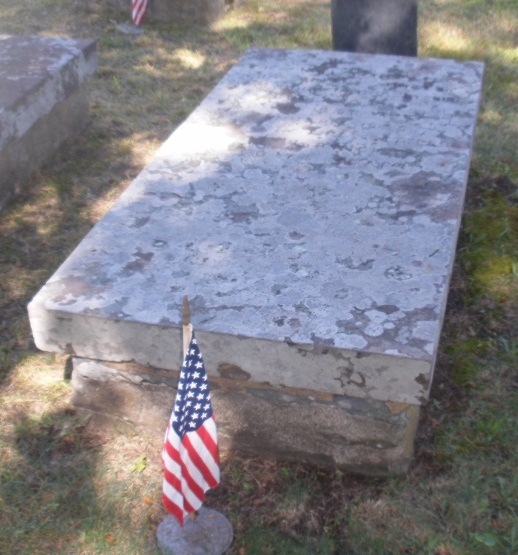
John Greene's grave marker, Surgeon John Greene Cemetery, Warwick

Greene served on the Warwick town council in 1647 and 1648, was the Warwick Deputy to the Rhode Island General Court from 1649 to 1657, and was named one of the Warwick freeman on a 1655 list of freemen. He was the magistrate for the Rhode Island General Court of Trials in March 1656. He died sometime between 28 December 1658 when he wrote his will, and 7 January 1659 when it was proved.

Greene had seven children, six of whom grew to maturity, and all with his first wife Joan Tattershall (or Tatarsole). The oldest child was John, who lived a long life which was almost entirely devoted to public service, including 10 one-year terms as Deputy Governor of the colony. Their son Peter married Mary Gorton, a daughter of colonial President Samuel Gorton.

Great-grandson William Greene Sr. served as Governor of the colony for 11 one-year terms during the middle of the 18th century, and his son William Greene Jr. served as the second governor of the State of Rhode Island during the American Revolutionary War. Greene is also the ancestor of former United States President Warren G. Harding and of General Nathanael Greene, the only American general in the American Revolutionary War to serve for the entire war, besides George Washington.

== See also ==
- List of early settlers of Rhode Island
- Colony of Rhode Island and Providence Plantations

== Bibliography ==
- Anderson, Robert Charles; Sanborn, George F. Jr.; Sanborn, Melinde L. (2003). The Great Migration, Immigrants to New England 1634–1635. Vol. III G-H. Boston: New England Historic Genealogical Society. ISBN 0-88082-158-2.
- Arnold, Samuel Greene (1859). History of the State of Rhode Island and Providence Plantations. Vol. 1. New York: D. Appleton & Company.
- Austin, John Osborne (1887). Genealogical Dictionary of Rhode Island. Albany, New York: J. Munsell's Sons. ISBN 978-0-8063-0006-1.
- Roberts, Gary Boyd (2009). Ancestors of American Presidents, 2009 edition. Boston, Massachusetts: New England Historic Genealogical Society. ISBN 978-0-88082-220-6.
