= Gorton-Greene House =

Coordinates: 41.6651794°N 71.4596696°W

- Interactive map of the Gorton-Greene House area

General information
- Type: Two-and-a-half story
- Architectural style: Gable-roofed
- Location: Warwick, Rhode Island
- Construction started: c.1685
- Governing body: Privately owned

The Gorton-Greene House, often called the Governor Greene Mansion, is an historic house in Warwick, Rhode Island. The house is one of the oldest surviving buildings in the state.

The house was built around 1685. According to the Providence Journal, "This 2½-story, gable-roofed structure has a massive stone chimney. The original structure was built by Samuel Gorton Jr., and was later bought by his niece's husband, Samuel Greene. This was the home of two 18th-century Rhode Island governors..." These governors were William Greene, Sr. and his son William Greene, Jr.

The latter had a correspondence with George Washington, who was among the house's famous visitors.
