= Richard Ward (governor) =

Governor of the Colony of Rhode Island

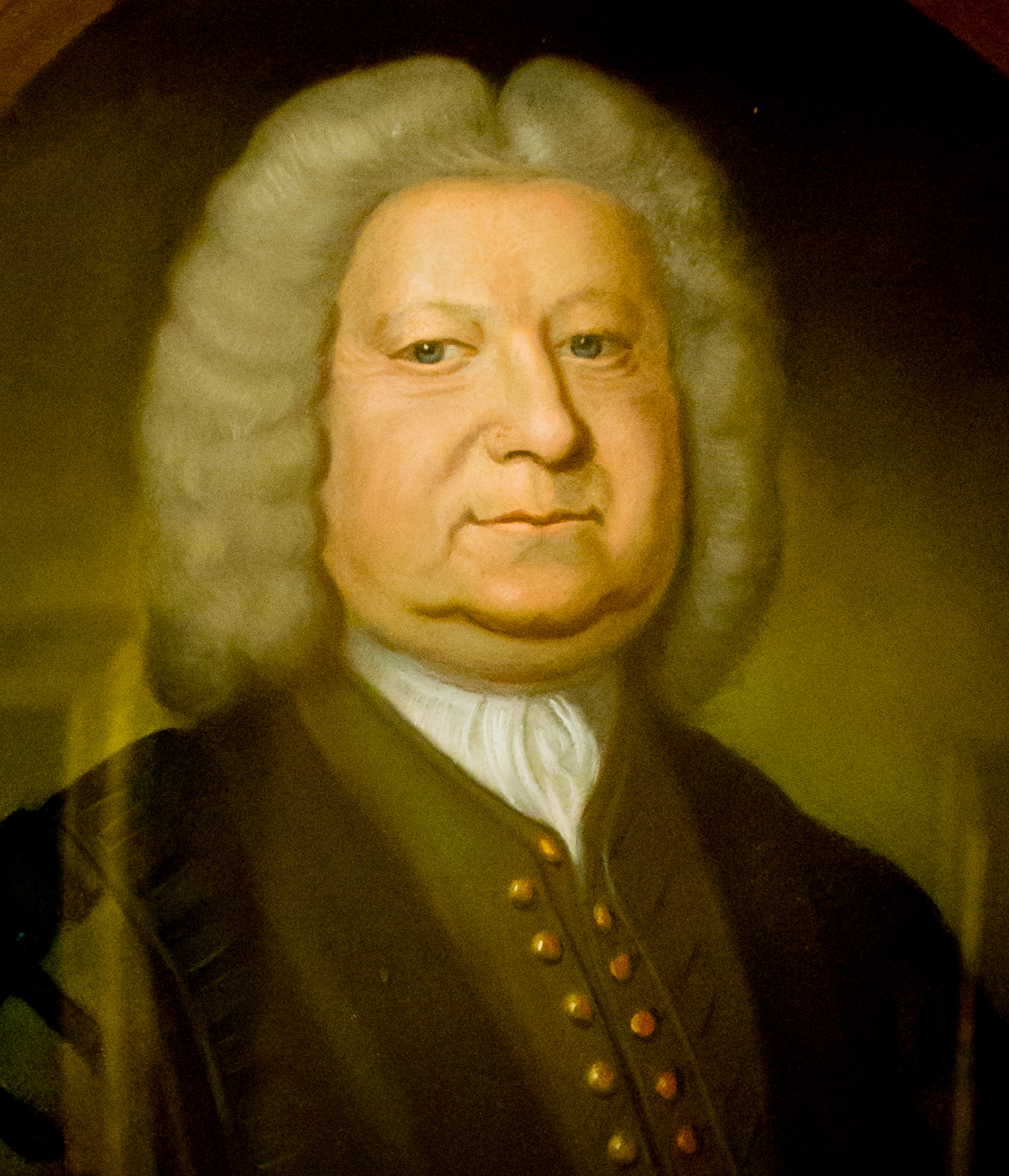

22nd Governor of the Colony of Rhode Island and Providence Plantations
- In office 1740–1743
- Preceded by: John Wanton
- Succeeded by: William Greene

25th Deputy Governor of the Colony of Rhode Island and Providence Plantations
- In office 1740–1740
- Governor: John Wanton
- Preceded by: Daniel Abbott
- Succeeded by: William Greene

29th Attorney General of Rhode Island
- In office 1712–1713
- Governor: Samuel Cranston
- Preceded by: Simon Smith
- Succeeded by: John Hammett

Personal details
- Born: April 15, 1689 Newport, Rhode Island
- Died: August 21, 1763 (aged 74) Newport, Rhode Island
- Resting place: Common Burying Ground, Newport
- Spouse: Mary Tillinghast
- Occupation: Attorney General, Deputy and Clerk of Assembly, General Recorder, Secretary of State, Deputy Governor, Governor
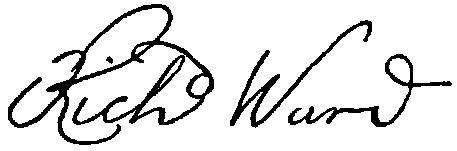
- Signature

Richard Ward (April 15, 1689 – August 21, 1763) was a governor of the Colony of Rhode Island and Providence Plantations, serving for a term from 1741 to 1742.

== Life and career ==
Ward was born in Newport, Rhode Island. He was the son of Thomas Ward and Amey Billings of Newport, and grandson of John Ward who had come from Gloucester, England. His father was a merchant who held many positions in the town government, and his grandfather had been an officer in Cromwell's Army who came to the American colonies following the accession of King Charles II of England.

Ward was made a freeman of Newport in 1710, then entered public service as Attorney General.He later became Deputy and Clerk of the Assembly, and then served as the General Recorder for the colony from 1714 to 1730. In 1723 he was paid six pounds for attending the trial of a group of pirates who were taken prisoner by Captain Solgar, commander of the British ship Greyhound. Of the 36 pirates taken into captivity, 26 were sentenced to hang, and the execution took place at Newport on July 19, 1723 at a place called Gravelly Point.

In 1726, Ward was one of the four Rhode Island commissioners appointed to meet a group of Connecticut commissioners to settle the boundary line between the two colonies. Ward was the Secretary of State from 1730 to 1733, and in 1740 became the Deputy Governor of the colony. In this capacity he and Samuel Perry were appointed trustees to the Indian sachem Ninigret. In 1741 he was selected as Governor for a single term.

In 1709 Ward married Mary Tillinghast (1689 - 1767), the daughter of John and Elizabeth (Sayles) Tillinghast, and granddaughter of Pardon Tillinghast who had come from Seven Cliffs, Sussex, England. The couple had 14 children, the ninth of whom was Samuel Ward who would later become a governor of the colony and a delegate to the Continental Congress. Two other children, Thomas and Henry, both served lengthy terms as Secretary of the Colony. Richard Ward's older sister Mary married Sion Arnold, a grandson of Governor Benedict Arnold.

Richard sporadically attended the Seventh-day Baptist Church at Newport, his parents' church. However, in 1753 he was baptized at the age of 64 and became a communicating member of the church.

Ward is buried under a brick vault in the Common Burying Ground in Newport, and his son Samuel, after first being buried in Philadelphia, was re-interred next to him.

== See also ==
- List of colonial governors of Rhode Island
- List of lieutenant governors of Rhode Island
- Colony of Rhode Island and Providence Plantations
