= William Greene Jr. =

American politician (1731–1809)

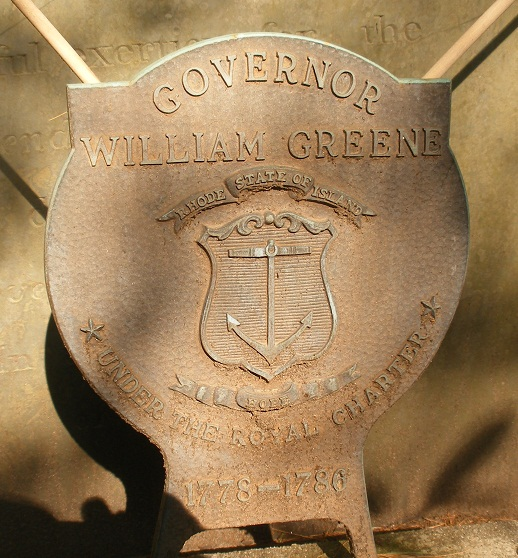
- Governor William Greene Jr. grave medallion

2nd Governor of Rhode Island
- In office May 4, 1778 – May 3, 1786
- Preceded by: Nicholas Cooke
- Succeeded by: John Collins

20th Chief Justice of the Rhode Island Supreme Court
- In office February 1777 – May 1778
- Preceded by: Metcalf Bowler
- Succeeded by: Shearjashub Bourn

Personal details
- Born: August 16, 1731 Warwick, Colony of Rhode Island, British America
- Died: November 29, 1809 (aged 78) Warwick, Rhode Island, U.S.
- Resting place: Governor Greene Cemetery, Love Lane, Warwick
- Spouse: Catharine Ray
- Children: Ray, Samuel, Phebe, Celia
- Parent(s): William Greene Sr. and Catharine Greene
- Education: Sufficient to write extensive letters
- Occupation: Deputy, chief justice, governor

William Greene Jr. (August 16, 1731 – November 29, 1809) was an American statesman who served as the second governor of the state of Rhode Island, serving in this capacity for eight years, five of which were during the American Revolutionary War. From a prominent Rhode Island family, his father, William Greene Sr., had served 11 terms as a colonial governor of Rhode Island. His great-grandfather, John Greene Jr. served for ten years as deputy governor of the colony, and his great-great-grandfather, John Greene Sr. was a founding settler of both Providence and Warwick.

Greene served the colony for many years as a Deputy to the General Assembly, a justice and chief justice of the Rhode Island Supreme Court, and then as governor. As a governor during the American Revolutionary War, his biggest concerns were the British sacking of the Rhode Island towns of Bristol and Warren, and the British occupation of Newport, which lasted for three years. After eight years as governor, Greene, who supported the use of hard currency, was defeated in the May 1786 election by John Collins who was an advocate of paper money.

Greene married a second cousin, Catharine Ray of Block Island, and the couple had four children, of whom Ray Greene became a United States Senator and Rhode Island Attorney General. Governor Greene died at his estate in the town of Warwick in 1809, and is interred at Governor Greene Cemetery in Warwick, where his parents were interred.

== Ancestry and early life ==
Born August 16, 1731, in Warwick in the Colony of Rhode Island and Providence Plantations, William Greene was the son of William Greene Sr. who had served for 11 one-year terms as the governor of the Rhode Island colony, and the great grandson of John Greene Jr. who had served for ten years as the deputy governor of the colony. His great great grandfather was John Greene Sr. who came from Salisbury, Wiltshire, England in 1635, was one of the original proprietors of Providence with Roger Williams, and later became one of the founding settlers of Warwick. Governor Greene is also descended from early Rhode Island settler and Warwick founder Samuel Gorton, as well as from Frances (Latham) Dungan, the "mother of governors."

Greene's mother was Catharine, the daughter of Benjamin and Susanna (Holden) Greene, and also a descendant of Warwick founder John Greene Sr. She also descends from Randall Holden who was a follower of Anne Hutchinson and signer of the Portsmouth Compact in 1638, establishing the first government in the Rhode Island colony.

In 1753 Greene became a freeman from the town of Warwick, and was thus able to vote. In 1762, he married his second cousin, Catharine Ray (July 10, 1731 – January 29, 1794), the daughter of Simon and Deborah (Greene) Ray of Block Island, and also a great granddaughter of Deputy Governor John Greene Jr. Catharine Ray had been a literary companion of Benjamin Franklin, and had a shared correspondence with the statesman.

== Political life ==
The Governor Greene Mansion where Greene and his father both lived

In October 1771 Greene was on a committee to finish the construction of the court house in the neighboring town of East Greenwich. He was subsequently selected as a deputy from his home town of Warwick in the years 1773, 1774, 1776, and 1777, and in May 1777 was selected as the Speaker of the House of Deputies for the entire colony. When the colony of Rhode Island declared its independence from Great Britain in May 1776, two months before the 13 colonies did so as a whole, Greene was one of the deputies that strongly supported this measure. In December 1776 a large body of British troops occupied Newport and the entire island of Aquidneck (Rhode Island). As a result, on December 10, 1776, Greene was chosen as a member of the colony's Council of War to act when the General Assembly was not in session. He subsequently served on the war council every year until the cessation of hostilities in 1781.

=== Supreme Court justice and governor ===
Greene had begun his public service in February 1767 when he became a justice of the Rhode Island Supreme Court (then called the Superior Court of Judicature, Court of Assize, and General Gaol Delivery), filling in for another member for a few months. He served another partial term on this court from 1768 to 1769, then in May 1774 he was again selected as a justice of the court, serving until February 1777 when he became the 20th Chief Justice of this body. The only break in his tenure as a justice occurred for a few months during the summer of 1776 when he was given the rank of Colonel, moved temporarily to the War Department, and briefly replaced as justice by John Gardner.

Greene gave up his position as Chief Justice in May 1778 when Governor Nicholas Cooke decided to step down from the arduous task of being a wartime governor, and, at the age of 47, Greene was elected as the second governor of the state. He served as governor for eight years, five of which were during the trying time of the American Revolutionary War. Greene was said to be of "remarkable physical vigor" because two or three times a week he would walk from Warwick or East Greenwich to Providence and return the same afternoon, about 17 miles round trip.

=== War effects on Rhode Island ===
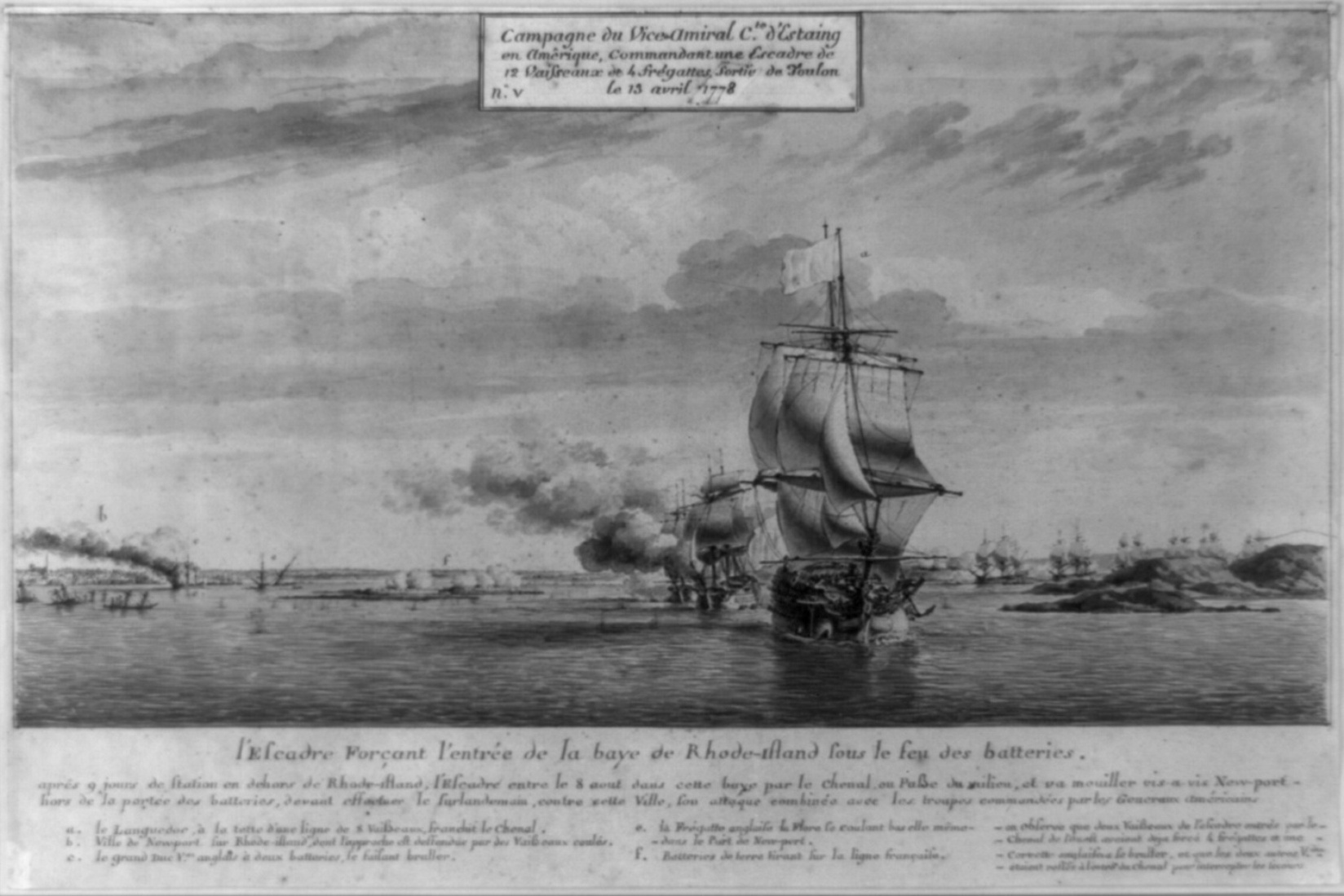
Entry of the French fleet in Newport Bay August 8, 1778 (Drawing by Pierre Ozanne, 1778)

Some of the events occurring during Greene's early tenure as governor included the British sacking of the towns of Bristol and Warren on May 25, 1778, and the subsequent arrival of the French fleet on July 29, 1778, under the command of the Comte d'Estaing. The ensuing Battle of Rhode Island on August 29, 1778, resulted in a stalemate, and the British continued to occupy Aquidneck Island. An encouraging event for the Americans, however, occurred on October 18, 1778, when the American vessel Hawk, under the command of Captain Silas Talbot, captured the British galley Pigot.

In October 1779 the British evacuated Newport, after having laid waste to this once wealthy community. The buildings of Rhode Island College (later Brown University) in Providence were used as a barracks and hospital during the latter part of the war until 1782. The most important event of 1780 was the arrival in Newport of 44 French ships under the command of Admiral De Ternay, who brought 6000 troops to serve under Count Rochambeau. Governor Greene convened a special session of the General Assembly to receive the French during this momentous occasion.

In 1781, after the surrender of Lord Cornwallis at Yorktown to French and American forces, the General Assembly changed the name of Kings County, Rhode Island to Washington County "in perpetual and grateful remembrance of the eminent and most distinguished services, and heroic actions of the illustrious commander-in-chief of the forces of the United States of America." As the new nation was forming, in 1782 Rhode Island and Georgia were the only two states that rejected a 5% import tax proposed by congress. The Rhode Island citizenry and leadership felt that such a tax bore unequally on Rhode Island as a maritime state. This was one of several considerations delaying Rhode Island's entry into the Union. Congressional delegate David Howell was backed by a unanimous vote of the House of Deputies and by Governor Greene in rejecting the import tax.

=== Post-war period ===
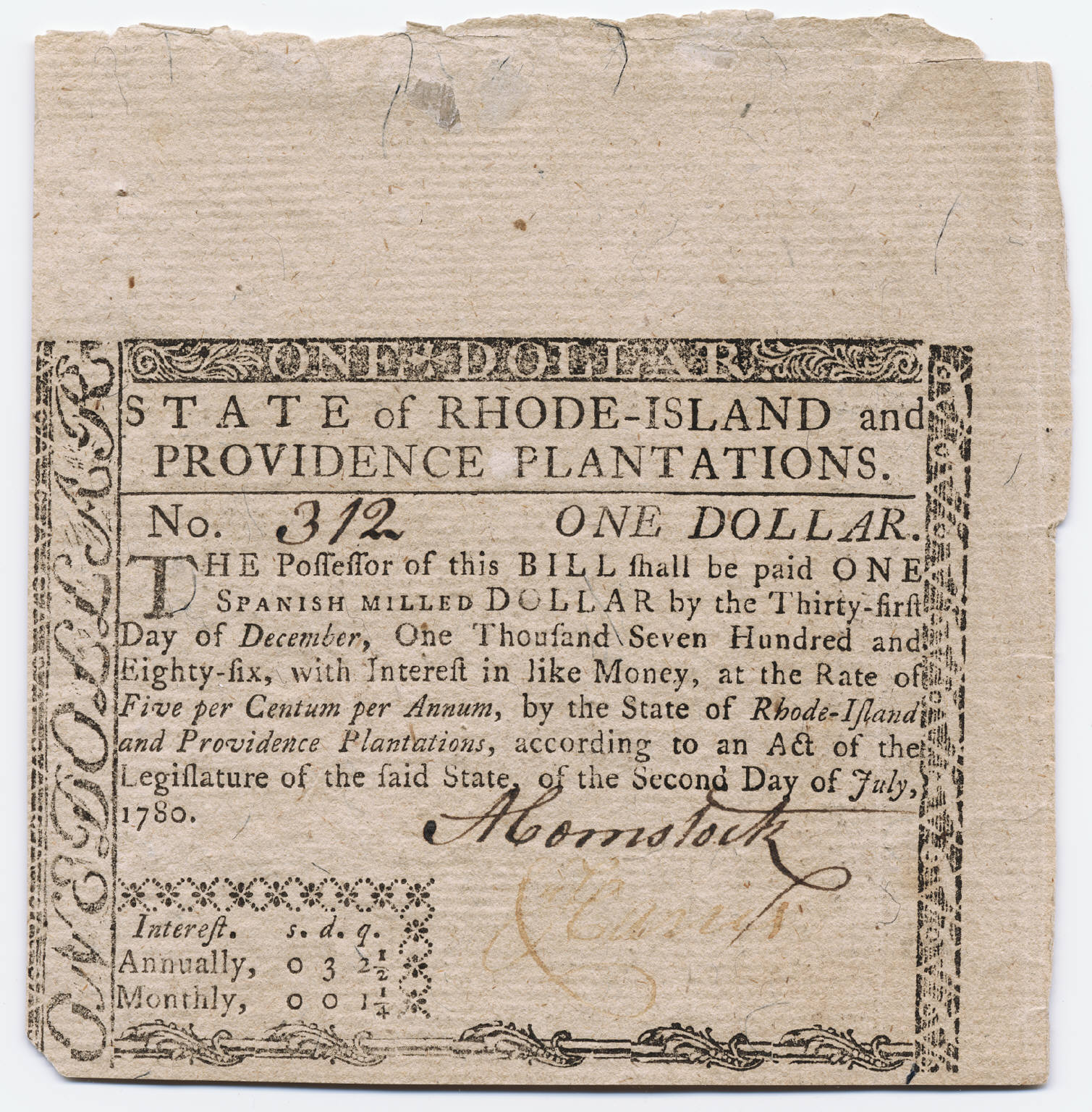
The use of paper money, which Greene opposed, was a highly contentious issue during his administration.

Several important acts passed by the General Assembly took place during Greene's tenure as governor, after the war was concluded. In February 1783 an act was passed giving Roman Catholics the same rights as Protestants. During the same session the assembly also passed a copyright law, protecting copyrights for 21 years. In June 1783 a new tariff bill was passed to help relieve some of the debt of the poverty-stricken state. A major human rights act was passed in the General Assembly in February 1784 allowing for the gradual emancipation of slaves. With this act, all children born to slave mothers after March 1 were to be free, and the further sale of any slaves became strictly prohibited.

The main issue of the election in May 1786 concerned the use of paper money. Greene backed a solid currency policy, which was supported by the General Assembly. His primary rival, John Collins, advocated the use of paper money. The soft money supporters won the election, and not only was Collins elected governor, but only 30 of the previous 81 members of the assembly were returned to office following this election.

After the end of his tenure as governor, Greene was not active in the civil affairs of the colony again until 1792 when he became an elector of the presidents and vice presidents of the United States. In this capacity he became a member of the first electoral college in which Rhode Island participated.

Greene died at his estate in Warwick on November 29, 1809, and was buried where his parents were buried. The cemetery was later named after the family, the Governor Greene Cemetery in Love Lane, Warwick.

== Family ==
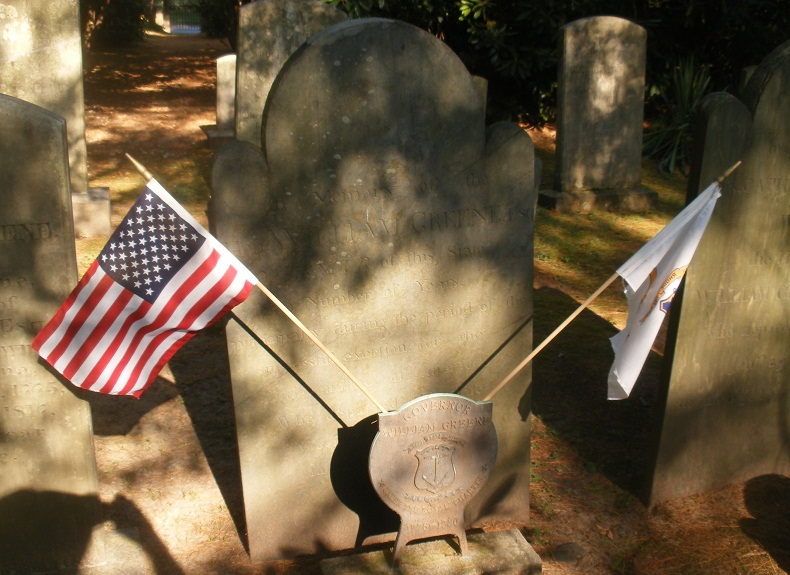
Grave marker for Governor Greene, Governor Greene Cemetery, Warwick

Governor Greene and his wife Catharine had four children. Ray married Mary M. Flagg, the daughter of George Flagg, esquire, of Charleston, South Carolina, and became Attorney General for the state and a United States Senator. Samuel married Mary Nightingale, the daughter of Colonel Joseph Nightingale of Providence; Phebe married Lieutenant Colonel Samuel Ward Jr., the son of Governor Samuel Ward and Anne Ray; and Celia married her cousin, Colonel William Greene, the son of Benjamin Greene of Warwick. The governor's grandson, also named William Greene III, was a lieutenant governor of Rhode Island under Governor Ambrose Burnside, shortly after the Civil War. Governor Greene was a second cousin of Colonel Christopher Greene, and a third cousin of General Nathanael Greene, both of whom served with distinction during the American Revolutionary War.

== Ancestry ==
Ancestors of William Greene Jr.

16. John Greene Sr. (1597–1658)
8. John Greene Jr. (1620–1708)
17. Joan Tattersall
4. Samuel Greene (1671–1720)
18. William Almy (1601–1676)
9. Ann Almy (1627–1709)
19. Audry Barlow (1603 – after 1676)
2. William Greene Sr. (1695–1758)
20. Samuel Gorton (1593 – c. 1677)
10. Benjamin Gorton (died 1699)
21. Mary Mayplet
5. Mary Gorton (1673–1732)
22. Richard Carder (died c. 1676)
11. Sarah Carder (died 1724)
23. Mary (died 1691)
1. William Greene Jr. (1731–1809)
24. John Greene (1597–1658)
12. Thomas Greene (1628–1717)
25. Joan Tattersall
6. Benjamin Greene (1666–1757)
26. Rufus Barton (died 1648)
13. Elizabeth Barton (died 1693)
27. Margaret
3. Catharine Greene (b. 1695)
14. Randall Holden (1612–1692)
7. Susannah Holden (1670–1734)
30. William Dungan (died 1636)
15. Frances Dungan (c. 1630 – 1697)
31. Frances Latham (1611–1677)

== See also ==
- List of governors of Rhode Island
- List of colonial governors of Rhode Island
- List of lieutenant governors of Rhode Island
- Colony of Rhode Island and Providence Plantations
- History of Rhode Island

== Sources ==
=== Bibliography ===
- Austin, John Osborne (1887). Genealogical Dictionary of Rhode Island. Albany, New York: J. Munsell's Sons. ISBN 978-0-8063-0006-1.
- Bicknell, Thomas Williams (1920). The History of the State of Rhode Island and Providence Plantations. Vol. 3. New York: The American Historical Society. OCLC 1953313.
- Smith, Joseph Jencks (1900). Civil and Military List of Rhode Island, 1647–1800. Providence, RI: Preston and Rounds, Co. "arnold."
- Turner, Henry Edward (1877). Greenes of Warwick in Colonial History. Davis & Pitman, Steam Printers. p. 65. "william greene governor RI."

Political offices
Preceded by Nicholas Cooke	Governor of Rhode Island; 1778–1786	Succeeded by John Collins
