= Governor Greene Cemetery =

Historic cemetery in Rhode Island, US

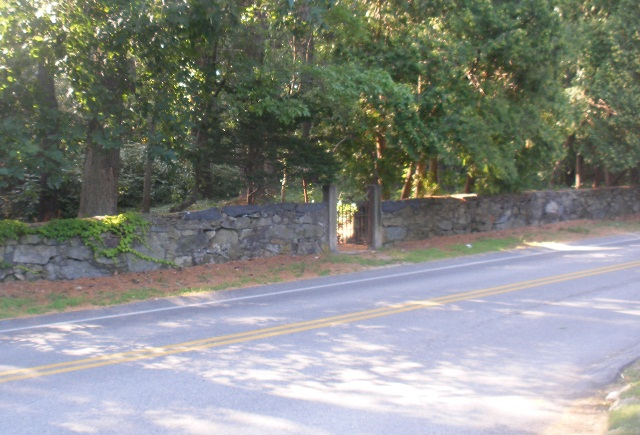
- Entrance from Love Lane
- Interactive map of Governor Greene Cemetery

Details
- Established: 1741
- Location: Warwick, Rhode Island
- Country: United States
- Coordinates: 41°39′59″N 71°27′34″W
- Type: Family
- Owned by: Private
- No. of graves: 43
- Find a Grave: Governor Greene Cemetery

The Governor Greene Cemetery, frequently called the Governor Greene Lot, is designated as Rhode Island Historical Cemetery, Warwick, #40, and is a late colonial cemetery located in Warwick, Rhode Island near the East Greenwich town line. It is a family cemetery with the graves of two Rhode Island governors (father and son), and other prominent politicians who are related to them.

== Description ==
The Governor Greene Cemetery, is located on Love Lane in Warwick, Rhode Island, and is a small family cemetery with only 43 known interments (plus a family dog). The first known interment was in 1741, and the last was in 1993, though the cemetery may still be in use. Four prominent people are buried here, each the son of the preceding person:

- William Greene (1695–1758), Rhode Island colonial governor for 11 years
- William Greene (1731–1809), Rhode Island governor during the American Revolutionary War
- Ray Greene (1765–1849), United States Senator and Rhode Island Attorney General
- William Greene (1797–1883), Rhode Island lieutenant governor shortly after the Civil War

Also buried here:

- Catharine (Ray) Greene (1731–1794), the wife of Governor William Greene, a long-time correspondent of Benjamin Franklin

== Image gallery ==
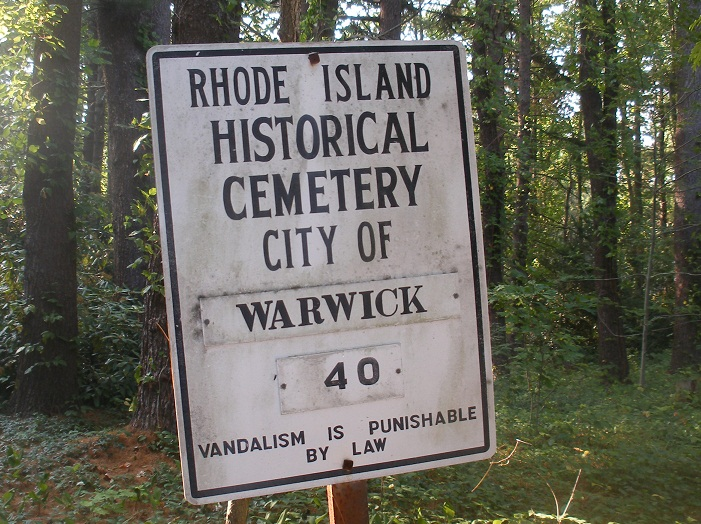
Rhode Island Historical Cemetery sign

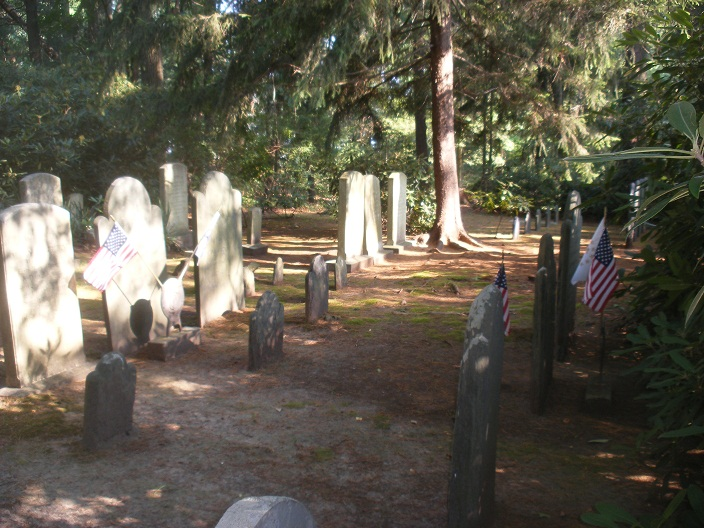
Graves of two governors, William Greene, Sr. with flags on right, and William Greene, Jr., on left

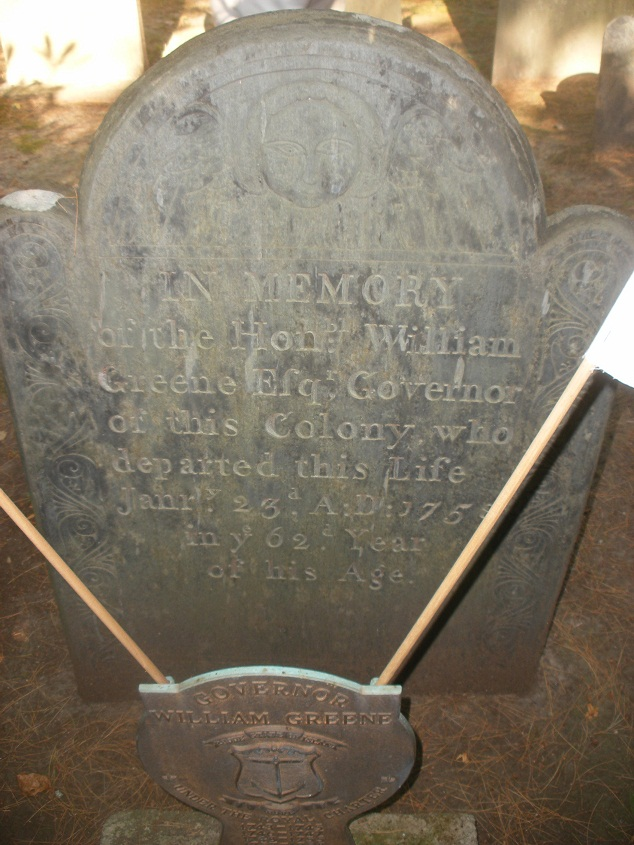
Grave marker for colonial governor William Greene

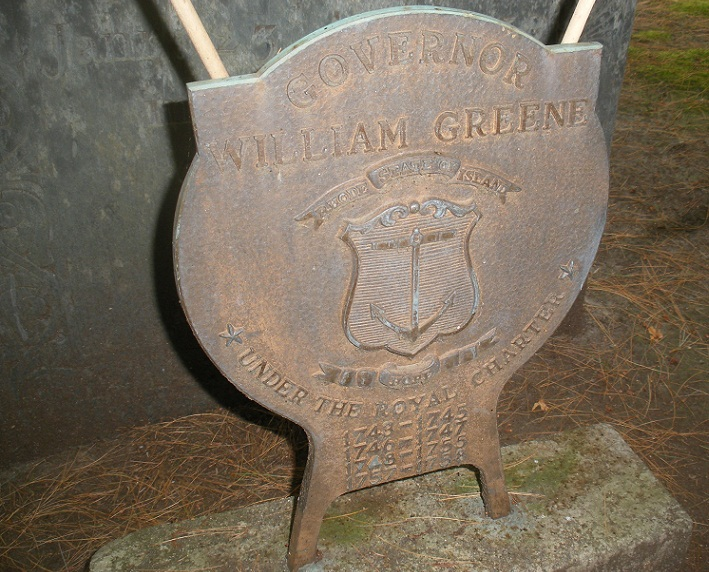
Grave medallion for colonial governor William Greene

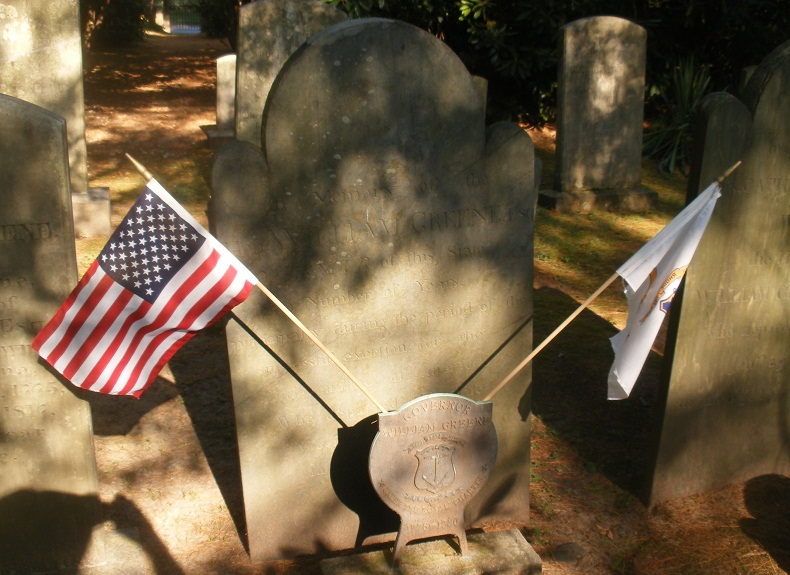
Grave marker for governor William Greene

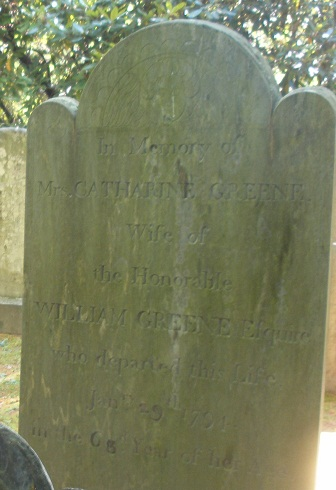
Grave marker for Catharine Greene, wife of Governor William, mother of Ray, and correspondent of Benjamin Franklin

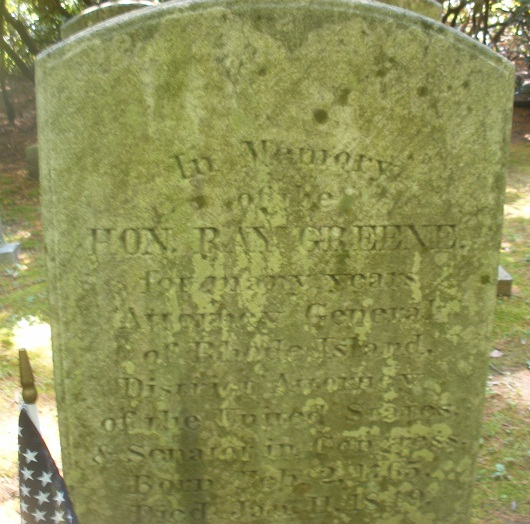
Ray Greene marker

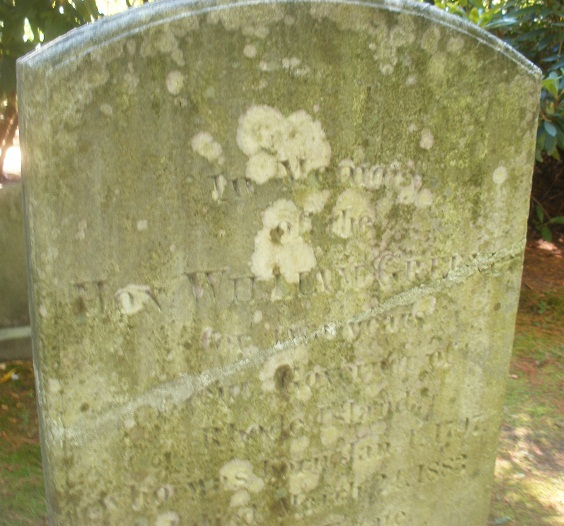
Marker for Lieutenant Governor William Greene
