= Bowridge Hill =

Hamlet in Dorset, England

Coordinates: 51.048°N 02.265°W

- Location within Dorset
- OS grid reference: ST8127
- Unitary authority: Dorset
- Ceremonial county: Dorset
- Region: South West
- Country: England
- Sovereign state: United Kingdom
- Post town: Gillingham
- Dialling code: 01747
- Police: Dorset
- Fire: Dorset and Wiltshire
- Ambulance: South Western

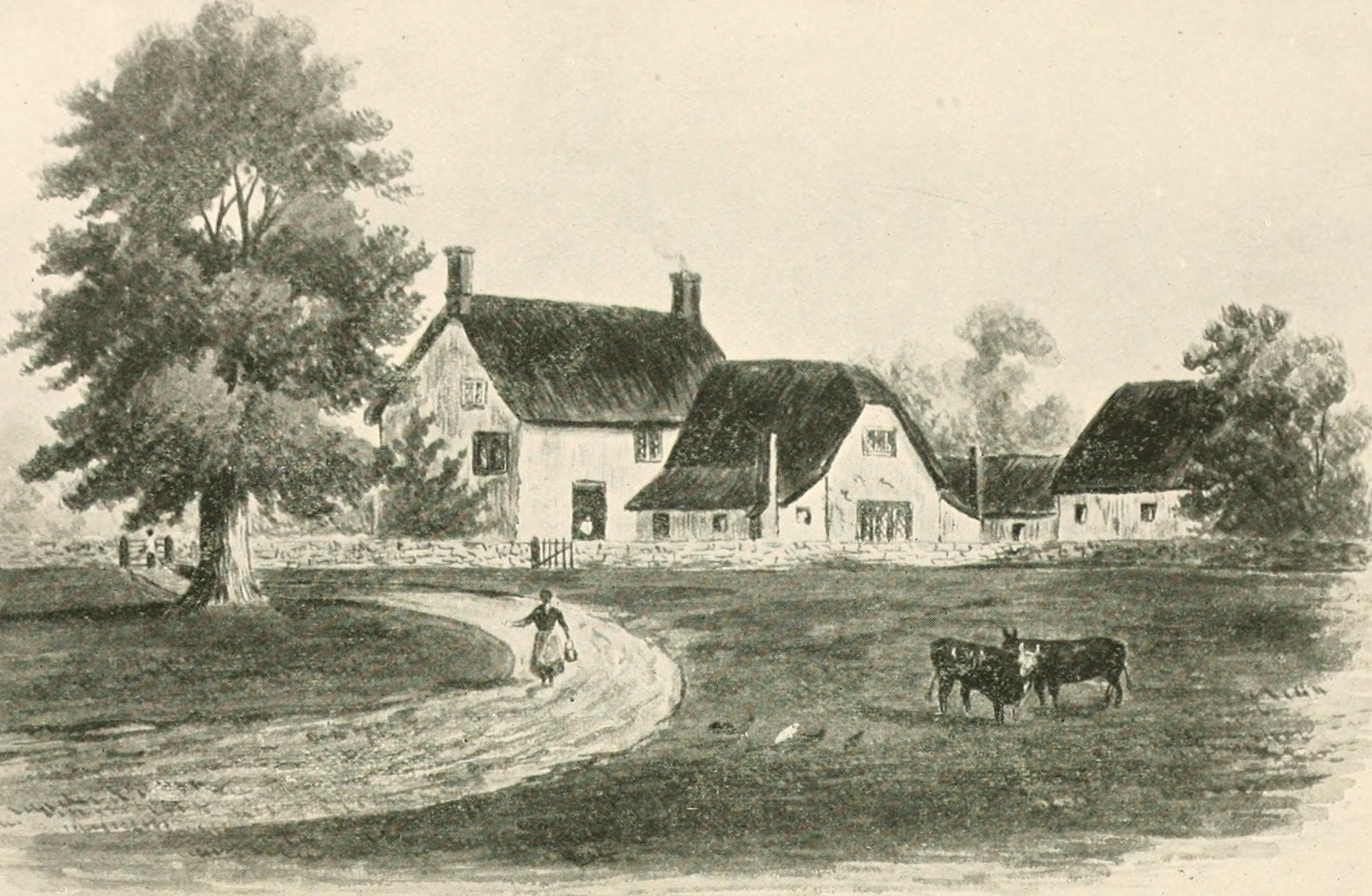
Bowridge Hill farmhouse (19th-century drawing)

Bowridge Hill is a hamlet 1 mile north east of Gillingham in Dorset, England, including the Grade II listed Lower Bowridge Hill Farmhouse, a 17th-century building once the home of the Greene family.
