= John Osborne Austin =

American genealogist (1849–1918)

- Born: December 28, 1849; Providence, Rhode Island, US
- Died: October 27, 1918 (aged 68); Providence, Rhode Island, US
- Resting place: Swan Point Cemetery, Providence
- Occupations: Genealogical author and publisher

John Osborne Austin (December 28, 1849 – October 27, 1918) was a genealogist who wrote and published several books, primarily on the families of Rhode Island. The work for which he is best known is the Genealogical Dictionary of Rhode Island, published in 1887.

== Life ==
Austin was the son of Samuel Austin and Elizabeth H. Osborne of Providence, Rhode Island. He was married in 1878 to Helen Augusta Whitaker, and in 1880 he and his wife, with their infant daughter, Rosamond, lived in Providence in the household of his wife's mother, Mrs. William Whitaker. It was during the late 1880s that Austin published his most important works, including the Genealogical Dictionary of Rhode Island in 1887, The Ancestry of Thirty three Rhode Islanders in 1889, and The Ancestral Dictionary in 1891.

Later in life he published some genealogical romances and other works. He and his wife lived in Providence; they are buried with their two children in Swan Point Cemetery in Providence.
