= Samuel Gorton =

Rhode Island colonial president

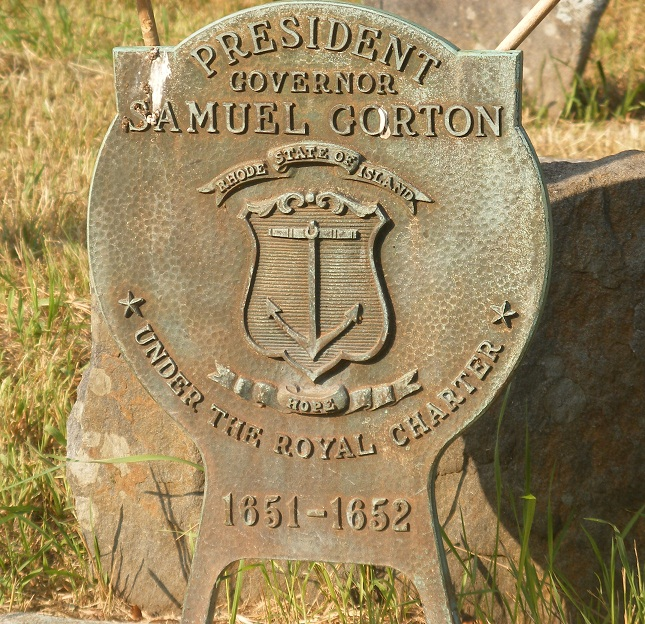
- Samuel Gorton governor's medallion

5th President of Providence and Warwick
- In office 1651–1652
- Preceded by: Nicholas Easton (as President of all four towns of the Colony of Rhode Island and Providence Plantations)
- Succeeded by: John Smith

Personal details
- Born: baptized 12 Feb 1592/3^{[a]} Manchester, Lancashire, England
- Died: by 10 December 1677 Warwick, Colony of Rhode Island and Providence Plantations
- Resting place: Samuel Gorton Cemetery, Warwick, Rhode Island
- Spouse: Mary Mayplett
- Children: 9
- Education: Private tutors
- Occupation: Clothier, assistant, president, commissioner, deputy

Samuel Gorton (1593–1677) was an early settler and civic leader of the Colony of Rhode Island and Providence Plantations and President of the towns of Providence and Warwick. He had strong religious beliefs which differed from Puritan theology and was very outspoken, and he became the leader of a small sect known as Gortonians, Gortonists, or Gortonites. As a result, he was frequently in trouble with the civil and church authorities in the New England Colonies.

Gorton was baptized in 1593 in Manchester, Lancashire, England and received an education from tutors in languages and English law. In 1637, he emigrated from England, settling first in Plymouth Colony, where he was soon ousted for his religious opinions and his demeanor towards the magistrates and ministers. He settled next in Portsmouth where he met with a similar fate, being whipped for his insubordination towards the magistrates. He next went to Providence Plantations where he once again encountered adverse circumstances, until he and a group of settlers purchased land from the Narragansett people. They settled south of the Pawtuxet River in an area which they called Shawomet.

Gorton refused to answer a summons following the complaints of two Indian sachems about being unfairly treated in a land transaction. He and several of his followers were forcefully taken away to Massachusetts, where he was tried for his beliefs and writings rather than for the alleged land transaction. He was sentenced to prison in Charlestown, though all but three of the presiding magistrates voted to give him the death sentence.

After being released, Gorton and two of his associates sailed to England where they obtained an official order of protection for his colony from the Earl of Warwick. During his stay in England, he was also very active in the Puritan underground, preaching in churches and conventicles known for their extreme religious positions. Once back in New England, he changed the name of Shawomet to Warwick in gratitude to his patron in England. He became part of the very civil authority which he had previously rejected, serving as an assistant, commissioner, deputy, and president of the two towns of Providence and Warwick.

He wrote a number of books, two of them while in England and several others following his return. He was a man of great learning and great intellectual breadth, and he believed passionately in God, and in the King, and in the individual man; but he was harshly critical of the magistrates and ministers who filled positions that he considered meaningless. His beliefs and demeanor brought him admiration from his followers but condemnation from those in positions of authority, and he was reviled for more than a century after his death. In more recent times, some historians and writers have looked upon him more favorably, and some now consider him to be one of the great colonial leaders of Rhode Island.

== Ancestry and early life ==
Samuel Gorton was baptized on February 12, 1592/3^{[a]} in Manchester, Lancashire, England, the son of Thomas and Anne Gorton from the chapelry of Gorton, a part of Manchester. His grandfather and great-grandfather were both also likely named Thomas Gorton of the same place. They were members of an ancient family, found in Gorton as early as 1332. While Gorton would later style himself "gentleman" and boast about the antiquity of his family, his parents were in fact of very modest means. When Gorton's father made his will in December 1610, he described himself as a "husbandman" (a small farmer, below the status of a yeoman) and the value of his father's estate was subsequently valued at just over £25.

Gorton was educated by tutors and became an accomplished scholar, particularly in the area of languages and English law. His library contained volumes "in which the ancient statutes of his country were written." Gorton entered the cloth trade, and by the late 1620s, he was living in London. Here, he was variously described as a "clothier," "merchant," and "factor of Blackwell hall." During the 1630s, while living in the parish of St. Olave Old Jewry, London, Gorton fell into debt and became entangled in various lawsuits. St. Olave was also a hotbed of unorthodox religious opinion, and Gorton soon came to adopt his own, highly eccentric and controversial theology.

=== Gorton's theology ===
Gorton's early development centered around religious themes, and he was inspired by the Puritan challenge to the established Anglican Church in early 17th century England. However, his ideas were not in the mainstream of English Puritan thought, and most authorities who wrote about him considered his theology to be radical. Three of his religious mentors were John Saltmarsh, William Dell, and William Erbury, the first two being chaplains in Oliver Cromwell's New Model Army, and Erbury a Welsh Puritan. All three of these men were considered to be unorthodox by their fellow clergymen.

Gorton's belief was that the Holy Spirit was present in all human beings, giving each person a divinity and obscuring any distinction between a saint and sinner. Religious conversion, then, was the willingness to follow the dictates of this inner divinity, even against human authority. Gorton felt that emphasizing external ordinances, as opposed to the inner Spirit, compelled people to live under the ordinances of man rather than of Christ. This theology was embraced by the Seeker and Ranter movements, and later by the Quaker movement—though Gorton never personally identified with any of these groups.

Gorton viewed the ordinances promoted by governments with deep suspicion. His ideology of anti-authoritarianism was based on his belief in the equality of all men, and he felt that both civil and religious hierarchical systems "denied the true priesthood of all believers." He considered an educated, professional ministry to be a form of Anti-Christ, a view also shared by both Dell and Erbury. He wrote in New Englands Memoriall (1669): "I would have you know that I hold my call to preach... not inferior to the call of any minister in the country."

== Plymouth, Portsmouth, and Providence ==
Gorton was living in London when he filed suit in a chancery case in February 1634/5.^{[a]} His reasons for leaving England and sailing to America were given in his many writings. One biographer summarized these: "He yearned for a country where he could be free to worship God according to what the Bible taught him, as God enabled him to understand it." Another biographer noted that "Gorton was one of the noble spirits who esteemed liberty more than life, and, counting no sacrifice too great for the maintenance of principal, could not dwell at ease in a land where the inalienable rights of humanity were not acknowledged or were mocked at." Gorton himself wrote, "I left my native country to enjoy liberty of conscience in respect to faith toward God and for no other end."

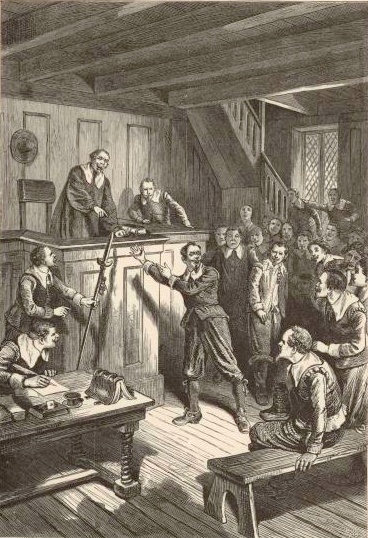
19th century depiction of Gorton on trial in Portsmouth

In March 1637, he arrived in Boston from London with his wife and several children at the height of the Antinomian Controversy. He sensed the growing hostility towards those with unorthodox theological views, such as Anne Hutchinson, and his stay there was short. He soon went to Plymouth Colony where he rented part of a house, becoming active in the community by volunteering during the Pequot War, as did his older brother Thomas. He soon had differences of opinion on religion with his landlord, and he was summoned to court in December 1638 based on the landlord's complaints. In court, Gorton "carried himself so mutinously and seditiously" towards both magistrates and ministers that he was sentenced to find sureties for his good behavior during the remainder of his tenure in Plymouth, and given 14 days to be gone from the colony. He left Plymouth shortly, but his wife and children were allowed to remain there while he proceeded to Portsmouth on Rhode Island (now called Aquidneck Island), arriving in late December 1638. Here he became a resident, and on the last day of April 1639 he and 28 others signed a compact calling themselves subjects of King Charles and forming a "civil body politick."

Things were no better for Gorton in Portsmouth than they had been in Plymouth. In 1640, his servant maid assaulted a woman whose cow had trespassed on his land, and this servant was ordered to court. Gorton refused to allow her to appear and went in her place. With his hostile attitude towards the judges, he was indicted on 14 counts, some of which were calling the magistrates "Just Asses" and calling a freeman in open court "saucy boy and Jack-an-Apes." Governor Coddington said, "All you that own the King take away Gorton and carry him to prison," to which Gorton replied, "All you that own the King take away Coddington and carry him to prison." Since he had previously been imprisoned, he was sentenced to be whipped, and soon left Portsmouth for Providence Plantations.

Trouble continued to follow Gorton to Providence, where his democratic ideas concerning church and state led to a division of sentiment in this town. On 8 March 1641, Roger Williams wrote to Massachusetts magistrate John Winthrop, "Master Gorton having abused high and low at Aquidneck, is now bewitching and bemadding poor Providence, both with his unclean and his foul censures of all the ministers of this country (for which myself in Christ's name have withstood him) and also denying all visible and external ordinances in depth of Familism." Gorton used his talent and energy to consolidate many discontented settlers into a destructive party in the otherwise peaceful settlement established by Williams. This group became known as the Gortonists or Gortonites.

Gorton was never received as an inhabitant in Providence because of his disorderly course. At this point, he moved once again to an area called Pawtuxet along the Pawtuxet River, about five miles south of the settlement at Providence (later the dividing line between the Rhode Island towns of Cranston and Warwick).

== Pawtuxet and Warwick ==
At Pawtuxet, there was immediate friction and a rift among the settlers, with a majority of them adhering to Gorton's views. The original Pawtuxet settlers were deeply offended by Gorton's conduct, notably William Arnold, his son Benedict Arnold, his son-in-law William Carpenter, and Robert Coles.

On November 17, 1641, these men sent a letter to Massachusetts in which they complained of the "insolent and riotous carriage of Samuel Gorton and his company," and they petitioned Massachusetts to "lend us a neighborlike helping hand." With no formal government established in the area, these Pawtuxet settlers put themselves under the jurisdiction of the Massachusetts Bay Colony in an arrangement that lasted 16 years. By doing this, they cooperated with Massachusetts in its quest to gain territories that would give them direct access to the Narragansett Bay, and they fueled a border conflict between Massachusetts and Rhode Island which continued for nearly 100 years. The Arnolds and their Pawtuxet partners assisted Massachusetts in efforts to remove Gorton and his followers from the entire region. For decades, territorial claims made by Massachusetts in the Narragansett region were an issue of contention for Roger Williams, who wanted to consolidate all of the towns around the Narragansett Bay into a unified government.

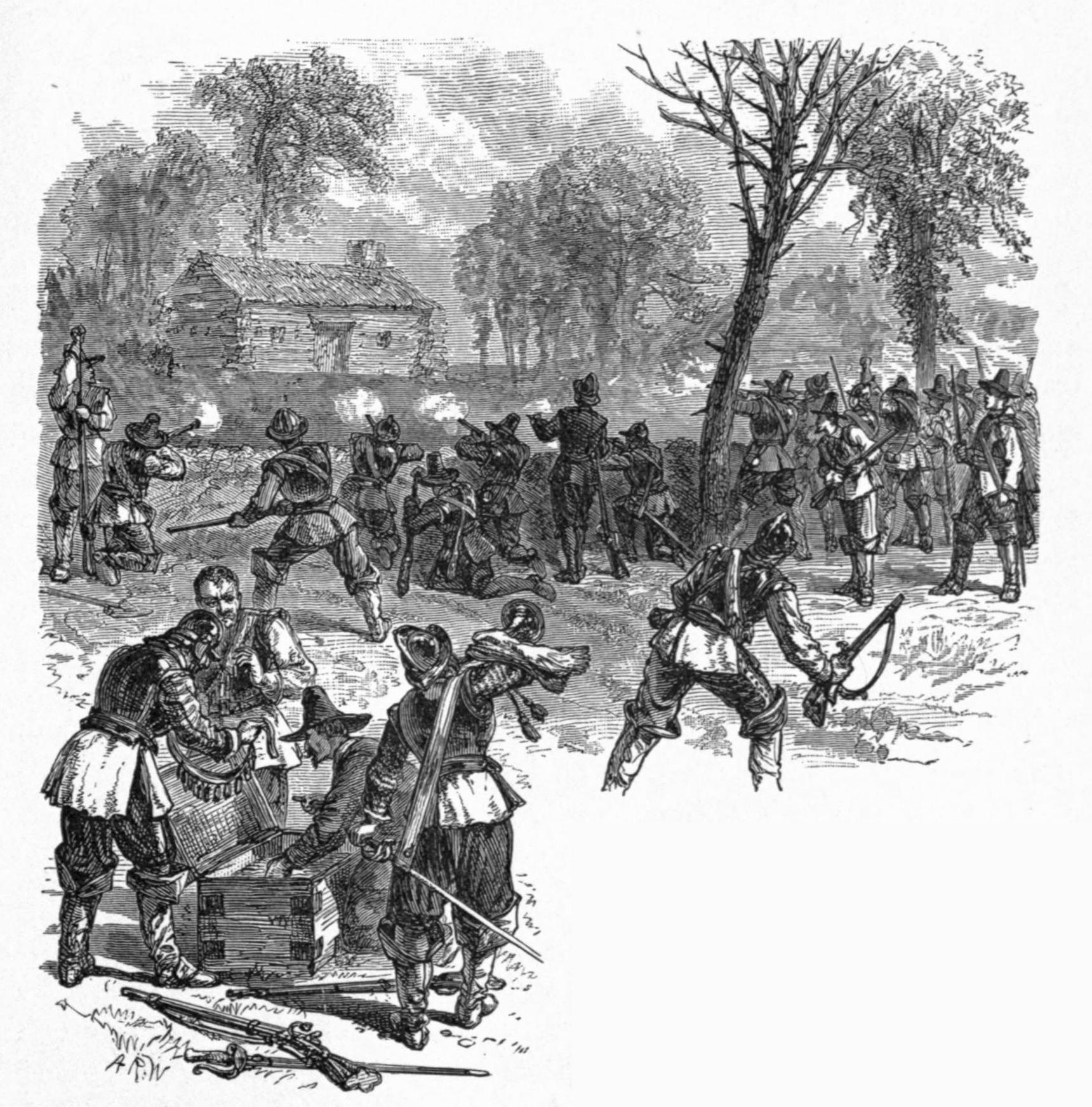
Attack on Shawomet by soldiers from Massachusetts in 1643 from a 19th-century history of the United States

In January 1643, Gorton and 11 others bought a large tract of land south of Pawtuxet from Narragansett tribal chief Miantonomi for 144 fathoms of wampum (864 feet or 263 meters), and they called the place Shawomet, using its Indian name. Here the settlers felt safe from the Massachusetts authorities and sent them at least two letters that were "filled with invective," presenting religious views that were anathema to the Puritan orthodoxy held by the Bay colony.

Gorton and others of Shawomet were summoned to the Boston court to answer complaints filed by two minor Indian sachems concerning some "unjust and injurious dealing" towards them. The Shawomet men refused the summons, claiming that they were loyal subjects of the King of England and beyond the jurisdiction of Massachusetts. Soldiers were sent after them, their writings were confiscated, and the men were taken to Boston for trial. Once in court, however, the charges against Gorton and the others had nothing to do with the original complaints, but instead were about Gorton's letters, conduct, and religious views. The following charge was made against him:

Upon much examination and serious consideration of your writing, with your answers about them, we do charge you to be a blasphemous enemy of the true religion of our Lord Jesus Christ and his Holy Ordinances, and also of all civil authority among the people of God and particularly in this jurisdiction.

The magistrates ordered that Gorton be confined to Charlestown, to be kept at labor, and to wear bolts or irons in order to prevent his escape. He would be sentenced to death, upon a conviction by a jury trial, if he were to break confinement or to maintain any of the "blasphemies or abominable heresies wherewith he hath been charged". All but three of the ruling magistrates gave Gorton the death sentence, though a majority of the deputies refused to sanction this. The sentencing took place in November 1643, but Gorton and the others were released from prison in March 1644, being banished from both Massachusetts and from Shawomet (which was now claimed by Massachusetts). Gorton and his associates were restricted from their own lands, so they went instead to Rhode Island and were warmly greeted by a faction of residents who were opposed to Governor Coddington.

== England ==
Gorton, Randall Holden, and John Greene boarded a ship in New Amsterdam in 1644 and sailed back to England, where Gorton spent four years seeking justice for the wrongs committed against them. In 1646, he published one of his many writings entitled Simplicity's Defence Against Seven Headed Policy, detailing the injustices against the Shawomet settlers. The Commissioner of Plantations, responsible for overseeing the activities of the colonies, issued an order to Massachusetts to allow the residents of Shawomet and other nearby lands to "freely and quietly live and plant" without being disquieted by external pressures.

Gorton remained in England while Holden returned to the American colonies in 1646 and presented the order to the Massachusetts authorities, who found it unacceptable. New England sent former Plymouth governor Edward Winslow to England as their agent to present a case against Gorton. Winslow asserted that Gorton's unorthodox preaching and submission to an inner spirit offered one "an inconceivable political liberty." Ultimately, however, Winslow's efforts failed when the English commission ruled in favor of Gorton.

This success did not end Gorton's time in England, however; he had been called to preach, and he found many favorable audiences for his religious views. He was now seeing profound changes in thinking concerning toleration, unlike when he left England in 1637. Such attitudes were being embraced by parliamentary leaders who were seeking broad support in their war against the king. During his time in England, Gorton had become a prominent part of the Puritan underground, centered mostly around London, where divergent sectarian views were being shared and embraced. He became a highly sought preacher and spent most of his time at Thomas Lamb's church in London's Bell Alley.

Lamb was most often termed a "General Baptist", and he entertained what were considered the most radical forms of Puritanism in his church. Gorton was described by one of his detractors as venting his "desperate opinions," while another opponent heard him "declare the irrelevance of church ordinances and officers." One of Gorton's extreme positions was in crossing traditional gender lines, and he likely preached at the conventicle of a woman who has only been identified as Sister Stag. It was clear that he viewed women with "a spiritual and social equality unusual for that time", as did other Puritan radicals, a position that was later embraced by the Quakers.

== Later life ==
Gorton returned to New England in 1648, landing in Boston that May. Massachusetts Bay authorities ordered his arrest, but he had a letter of protection from Robert Rich, 2nd Earl of Warwick which saw him safely back to his family. In honor of the Earl's intercession on his behalf, he changed the name of Shawomet to Warwick.

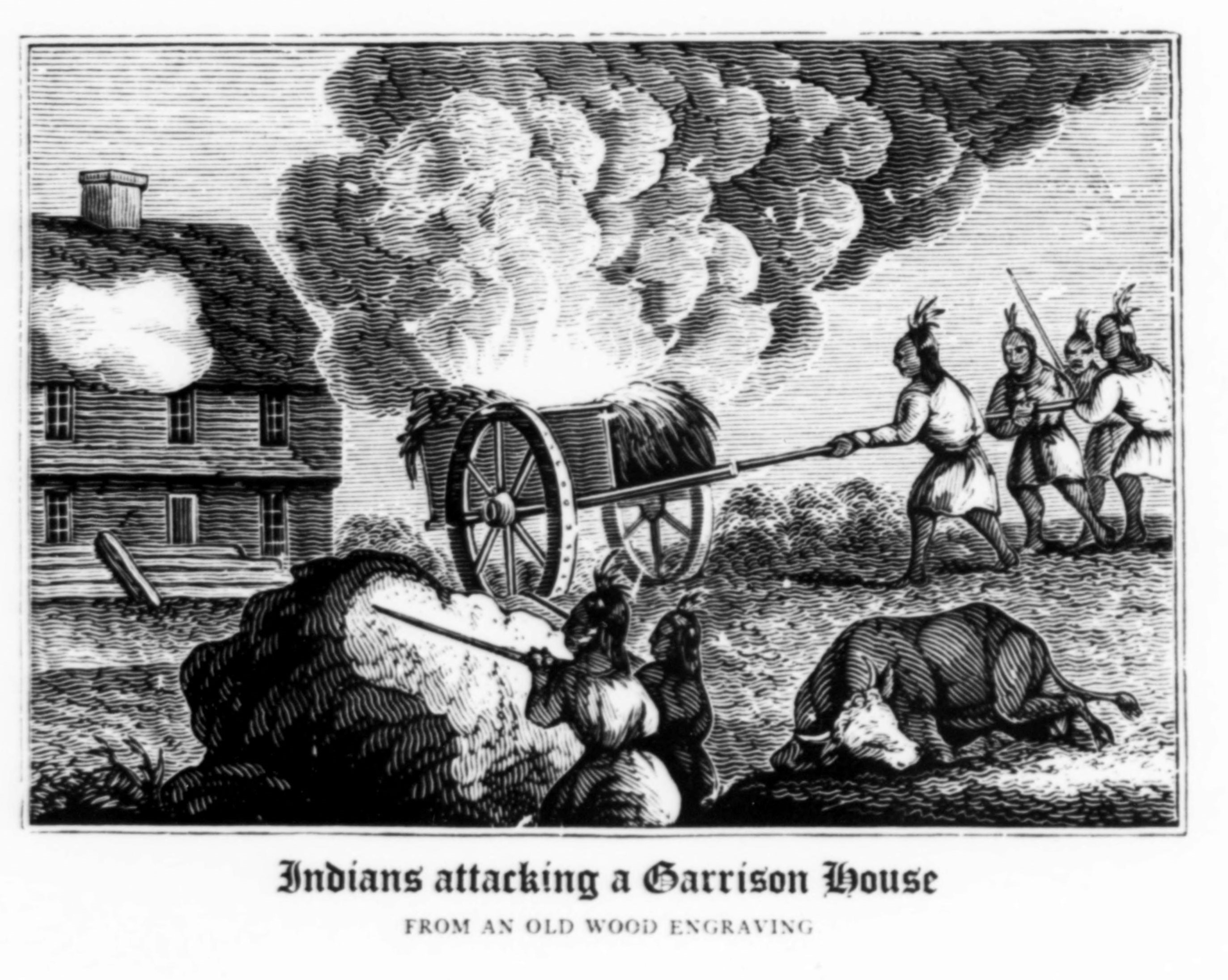
Warwick was destroyed in 1676 during King Philip's War.

Gorton's views on the role of government had transformed markedly during his time in England. He became actively involved in roles that he had previously criticized, now that his settlement of Warwick was secured by royal decree. The separate settlements of Providence Plantations, Portsmouth, Newport, and now Warwick all came together under a fragile government, choosing John Coggeshall as its first President in 1647 and calling itself the Colony of Rhode Island and Providence Plantations. With his success in England, Gorton was seen as a leader in the colony and he was chosen as the Warwick assistant (magistrate) in 1649 under colonial President John Smith, also from Warwick. Both Gorton and Smith declined their positions but were fined for doing so; they both ultimately served and their fines were remitted.

William Coddington was in England during this time on a mission to remove the island towns of Newport and Portsmouth from the government with Providence and Warwick, hoping to set himself up as Governor for Life of Newport and Portsmouth. In 1651, Gorton was chosen as President of the colony, but Coddington had been successful in gaining his commission to put the island towns under his own authority, so Gorton presided only over the plantations of Providence and Warwick. In 1652, Smith was once again selected as president and Gorton was once again the assistant from Warwick. A remarkable statute during this administration was likely authored by Gorton, an act for the emancipation of slaves.

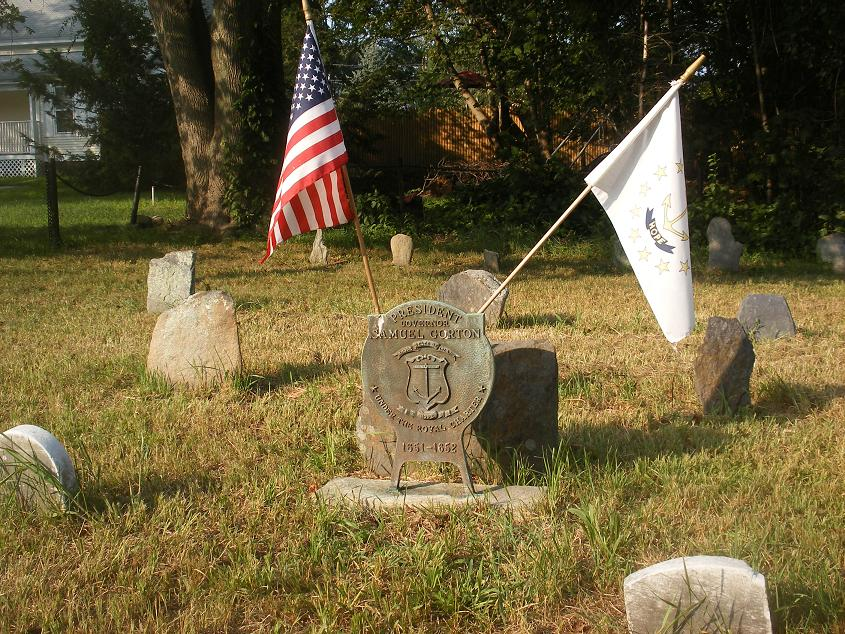
Grave of Samuel Gorton, Warwick

Following his brief time as a magistrate, Gorton remained active in the civil affairs of Warwick. He was chosen as a commissioner during a majority of the years from 1651 to 1663, and his name appears on a list of Warwick freemen in 1655. He was one of several prominent citizens named in Rhode Island's Royal Charter of 1663. Also, he was the Warwick Deputy to the General Assembly for four years during the last half of the 1660s. He last served in a public capacity in 1670 when he was 78 years old.

In 1675, Gorton had received word that the Indians living in the Connecticut Colony intended to invade the Narragansett country, and later in the same year King Phillips War broke out in the New England colonies. The Colony of Rhode Island and Providence Plantations took no active role in provoking the conflict, but its geographical location caused it to suffer more than any other colony. The people of Warwick were forced to flee their homes during the war and returned in the spring of 1677 to a barren wasteland and the task of rebuilding.

Gorton did not leave a will, but several deeds to his heirs on November 27, 1677, distributed his properties, and in one of these instruments he called himself "professor of the mysteries of Christ." He was dead by December 10, though the exact date of his death was not recorded. He is buried in the Samuel Gorton Cemetery, Rhode Island Historic Cemetery, Warwick #67, at 422 Samuel Gorton Avenue in Warwick, and his grave is marked with a governor's medallion and an uninscribed field stone.

== Beliefs, demonization, and restitution ==
Gorton left a comfortable life in England to enjoy liberty of conscience in the English colonies of America. According to Rhode Island historian Thomas Bicknell, he was a man of intense individualism who recognized three pillars of power: "God, the Supreme One; the King, his vicegerent; and himself, the individual man. Between these he recognized no other source of authority. The freedom of the individual was only limited by the express will of God or the King." He and his followers held that "by union with Christ, believers partook of the perfection of God, that Christ is both human and divine, and that Heaven and Hell exist only in the mind."

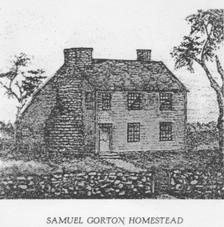
Gorton's house built after King Philip's War

The following are some of the activities for which he and his followers were imprisoned, whipped, put to hard labor, and banished, and had their cattle, food, and property confiscated:

- teaching that heaven and hell were states existing in the hearts of men and women, rather than a material place where people reside in an afterlife
- teaching that the baptism of infants would not save a baby's soul, since babies had no capacity to understand or accept the concepts of Christianity (a position also held by Roger Williams and other Baptists)
- teaching that the ministers and magistrates should not be the sole or ultimate authorities of how biblical interpretations were enforced with criminal laws
- teaching that God is a unity rather than a trinity
- objecting to the mandatory paying of tithes to a state church, and mandatory attendance, since salvation came through individual faith freely chosen, and not from conformity to denominational creeds and ritual

In his day, Gorton was largely reviled by those who were not his followers, and his insolence towards colonial leaders made him the butt of most early writers of Rhode Island's colonial history. Nathaniel Morton was the keeper of the Plymouth records for years, and he published a "libellous and scandalous" book about Gorton while he was still alive. On June 30, 1669, Gorton wrote a lengthy letter of denial, refuting virtually every point made by Morton. More than a century later, however, Rhode Island Secretary of State Samuel Eddy wrote, "In the case of Gorton... no one of the first settlers has received more unmerited reproach, nor any one suffered so much injustice. His opinions on religious subjects were probably somewhat singular, though certainly not more so than in any at this day. But that was his business; his opinions were his own and he had a right to them." Later, Rhode Island historian and Lieutenant Governor Samuel G. Arnold wrote of Gorton:

He was one of the most remarkable men that ever lived. His career furnishes an apt illustration of the radicalism in action, which may spring from ultra-conservatism in theory. The turbulence of his earlier history was the result of a disregard for existing law, because it was not based upon what he held to be the only legitimate source of power—the assent of the supreme authority in England. He denied the right of a people to self-government, and contended for his views with the vigor of an unrivalled intellect and the strength of an ungoverned passion. But when this point was conceded, by the securing of a Patent, no man was more submissive to delegated law. His astuteness of mind and his Biblical learning made him a formidable opponent of the Puritan hierarchy, while his ardent love of liberty, when it was once guaranteed, caused him to embrace with fervor the principles that gave origin to Rhode Island.

— Lieutenant Governor Samuel G. Arnold

Gorton was described as being gentle and sympathetic in private intercourse, and generous and sympathetic in nature. He gave to others the same liberty of thought and expression that he claimed for himself. One of his biographers wrote that, after Roger Williams, no man was more instrumental in establishing the foundation of equal civil rights and liberty in Rhode Island. Puritan scholar Philip Gura sees him as "not a dangerous and immoral troublemaker but rather a man who, more than any other New Englander, was in step with the religious politics of his times and whose history illuminates the complexity of the relationship of American to English Puritanism."

== Writings by and about Gorton ==
Gorton's first book was Simplicities Defence. He wrote another book while in England entitled An Incorruptible Key composed of the CX. Psalms wherewith you may open the rest of the Scriptures. This book was published in 1647 and expanded the commentary on his radical beliefs. After returning to New England, he wrote Saltmarsh returned from the Dead (1655), inspired by the new model army chaplain John Saltmarsh who had died in 1647. The sequel to this was An Antidote against the Common Plague of the World (1656) which was dedicated to Oliver Cromwell. This volume centers on Matthew 23, in which the scribes and Pharisees are condemned for degrading God's will and word. Gorton's final published work was Antidote Against Pharisaical Teachers (1656), though he left behind an unpublished manuscript of several hundred pages entitled Exposition upon the Lord's Prayer.

Two book-length biographical accounts of Gorton have been published. In 1896, Lewis G. Janes published Samuel Gorton: a forgotten Founder of our Liberties. Adelos Gorton published The Life and Times of Samuel Gorton in 1907, which includes an extensive account of Rhode Island's earliest colonial records.

== Family and descendants ==
Samuel Gorton was married before January 11, 1629/30^{[a]} to Mary Mayplet, the daughter of haberdasher John Mayplet. Mary was the granddaughter of the Reverend John Mayplet, Rector of Great Leighs Parish in Essex, Vicar of Northolt in Middlesex, and a writer on the topics of natural history and astrology. Her brother was Dr. John Mayplet, physician to King Charles II.

== See also ==
- List of colonial governors of Rhode Island
- List of early settlers of Rhode Island
- Colony of Rhode Island and Providence Plantations
