= List of elections in 1837 =

The following elections occurred in the year 1837.

== North America ==
=== Canada ===
- 1837 Newfoundland general election

=== Central America ===
- 1837 Costa Rican Head of State election

=== United States ===
==== United States Senate ====
- 1836 and 1837 United States Senate elections
- United States Senate election in New York, 1837

==== United States House of Representatives ====
- 1836 and 1837 United States House of Representatives elections

==== United States lieutenant gubernatorial ====
- 1837 Connecticut lieutenant gubernatorial election

==== United States gubernatorial ====
- 1837 Alabama gubernatorial election
- 1837 Connecticut gubernatorial election
- 1837 Georgia gubernatorial election
- 1837 Indiana gubernatorial election
- 1837 Maine gubernatorial election
- 1837 Maryland gubernatorial election
- 1837 Massachusetts gubernatorial election
- 1837 Michigan gubernatorial election
- 1837 Mississippi gubernatorial election
- 1837 New Hampshire gubernatorial election
- 1837 New Jersey gubernatorial election
- 1837 Rhode Island gubernatorial election
- 1837 Tennessee gubernatorial election
- 1837 Vermont gubernatorial election
- 1837 Virginia gubernatorial election

==== United States mayoral elections ====
- 1837 Boston mayoral election
- 1837 Chicago mayoral election

== Europe ==
=== United Kingdom ===
- 1837 United Kingdom general election

=== France ===
- 1837 French legislative election

=== Spain ===
- 1837 Spanish general election

== See also ==
- Category:1837 elections
