= 1839 Rhode Island gubernatorial election =

- April 17, 1839
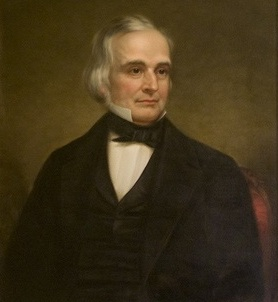

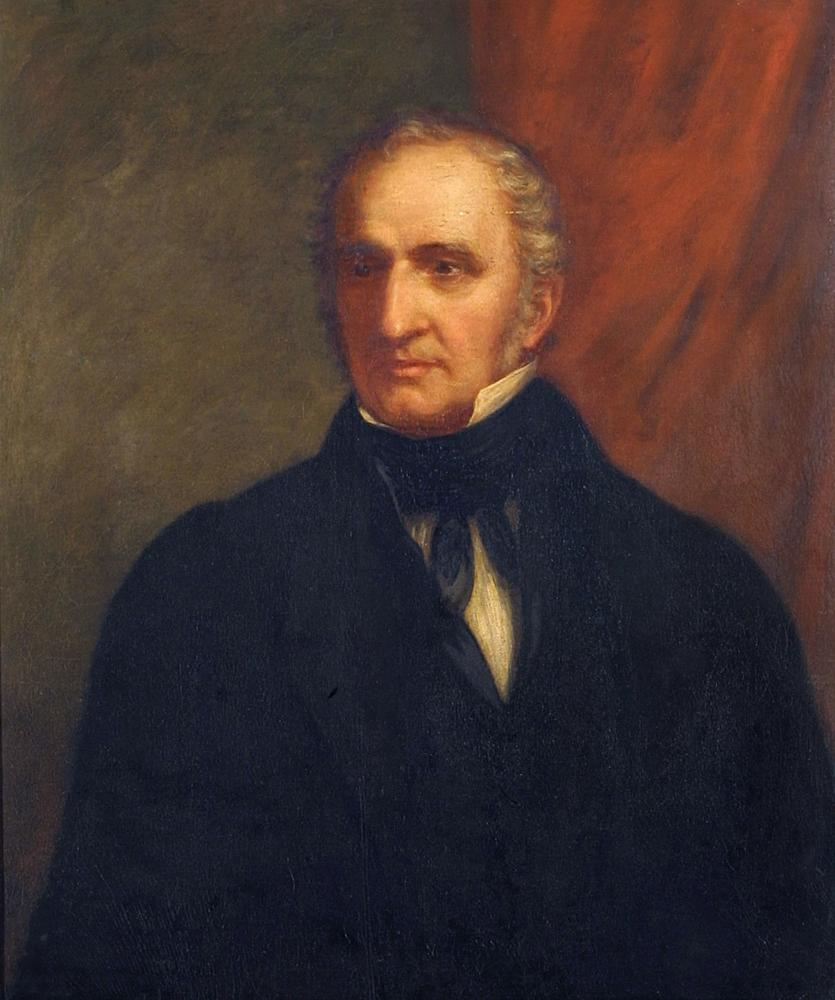
Nominee	William Sprague	Nathaniel Bullock	Tristram Burges
Party	Whig	Democratic	Liberal
Popular vote	2,908	2,771	457
Percentage	47.11%	44.89%	7.40%
- County results Sprague: 40–50% 50–60% Bullock: 60–70%
Governor before election
William Sprague
Whig
Elected Governor
Samuel Ward King (acting)
Whig

The 1839 Rhode Island gubernatorial election was held on April 17, 1839.

Incumbent Whig governor William Sprague ran for re-election for a second term against Democratic nominee Nathaniel Bullock and Liberal nominee Tristram Burges.

Since no candidate received a majority in the popular vote, the senior senator, Samuel Ward King, acted as governor for the term.

== General election ==
=== Candidates ===
- Nathaniel Bullock, Democratic, former U.S. Collector of Customs
- Tristram Burges, Liberal (Whig faction), Whig nominee for governor in 1836
- William Sprague, Whig, incumbent governor

=== Results ===
1839 Rhode Island gubernatorial election (Note: Some sources give Sprague's vote as 2,901 or 2,948.)
Party	Candidate	Votes	%	±%
Whig	William Sprague (incumbent)	2,908	47.11%	
Democratic	Nathaniel Bullock	2,771	44.89%	
Liberal Party	Tristram Burges	457	7.40%	
Scattering		37	0.60%	
Majority		137	2.22%	
Turnout		6,173		
Whig hold		Swing		
