= List of people executed in Rhode Island =

The following is a list of people executed by the U.S. state and former colony of Rhode Island from 1670 to 1845.

Capital punishment was first abolished in Rhode Island in 1852, reinstated in 1873 and was finally abolished in 1984. 70 people, 67 men and 3 women, were executed in Rhode Island, 64 by hanging (including one hung, drawn, and quartered) and 6 by firing squad. Only 7 of the executions were after Rhode Island became a U.S. state.

== List of people executed in Rhode Island ==
Executions by firing squad

Name	Race	Age	Sex	Date of execution	County	Crime	Victim(s)	Governor
Thomas Flounders	White		M	November 2, 1670	Newport	Murder	Walter House, white	Benedict Arnold
William Thomas	White		M	June 9, 1671	Newport	Burglary		Benedict Arnold
Thomas Cornell	White		M	May 23, 1673	Newport	Murder	Rebecca Cornell, white (mother)	Nicholas Easton
Punnean	Native American		M	May 23, 1673	Newport	Rape (Note: Victim died from her injuries.)	Lettic Bulgar, white	Nicholas Easton
Jankssick	Native American		M	November 5, 1673	Newport	Murder	Ossaroan, Native American	Nicholas Easton
Quaoganit	Native American		M	May 19, 1674	Newport	Murder	His wife and another man, Native American	William Coddington
Joshua Tefft	White		M	January 18, 1676 (Note: Drawn and quartered.)	Providence	Fighting	Several Native Americans	William Coddington
Quanopan	Native American		M	August 26, 1676	Newport	Rebellion		Walter Clarke
Sunkoorunasuck	Native American		M	August 26, 1676	Newport	Rebellion		Walter Clarke
Wonanaquabin	Native American		M	August 26, 1676	Newport	Rebellion		Walter Clarke
John Woropoak	Native American		M	August 26, 1676	Newport	Rebellion		Walter Clarke
Peter Py	Black		M	November 10, 1679	Newport	Rape		John Cranston
Anne Williams	White		F	October 27, 1687	Bristol	Murder	Her infant, mixed (Note: Native American father.)	Edmund Andros
Joseph	Native American		M	October 12, 1709	Bristol	Murder	Two Native Americans	Samuel Cranston
Josias	Native American		M	October 12, 1709	Bristol	Murder	Two Native Americans	Samuel Cranston
Hannah Degoe	Mixed (Note: Mulatta.)	14	F	November 29, 1710	Bristol	Murder	Her illegitimate infant, mixed	Samuel Cranston
Job (Note: Only slave executed in Rhode Island.)	Native American		M	September 12, 1712	Newport	Murder	Two sons of Gyles Slocum, white	Samuel Cranston
Jeremiah Meacham	White		M	May 12, 1715	Newport	Murder	His wife and sister-in-law, white	Samuel Cranston
William Dyer	White		M	April 21, 1719	Newport	Murder	Female, white (wife)	Samuel Cranston
Reuben Hall	White		M	June 23, 1720	Newport	Murder	Freelove Dolliver, white	Samuel Cranston
William Blades	White	28	M	July 19, 1723	Newport	Piracy		Samuel Cranston
Charles Harris	White		M	July 19, 1723	Newport	Piracy		Samuel Cranston
Thomas Hugget	White	24	M	July 19, 1723	Newport	Piracy		Samuel Cranston
Thomas Linnicar	White	21	M	July 19, 1723	Newport	Piracy		Samuel Cranston
Peter Cues	White	32	M	July 19, 1723	Newport	Piracy		Samuel Cranston
Daniel Hyde	White	23	M	July 19, 1723	Newport	Piracy		Samuel Cranston
William Jones	White	28	M	July 19, 1723	Newport	Piracy		Samuel Cranston
Stephen Mundon	White	29	M	July 19, 1723	Newport	Piracy		Samuel Cranston
Edward Eaton	White	38	M	July 19, 1723	Newport	Piracy		Samuel Cranston
Abraham Lacy	White	21	M	July 19, 1723	Newport	Piracy		Samuel Cranston
John Brown	White	29	M	July 19, 1723	Newport	Piracy		Samuel Cranston
Edward Lawson	White	20	M	July 19, 1723	Newport	Piracy		Samuel Cranston
James Sprinkley	White	28	M	July 19, 1723	Newport	Piracy		Samuel Cranston
John Tomkins	White	21	M	July 19, 1723	Newport	Piracy		Samuel Cranston
Joseph Sound	White	28	M	July 19, 1723	Newport	Piracy		Samuel Cranston
Francis Laughton	White	39	M	July 19, 1723	Newport	Piracy		Samuel Cranston
Charles Church	White	21	M	July 19, 1723	Newport	Piracy		Samuel Cranston
John Fitzgerald	White	21	M	July 19, 1723	Newport	Piracy		Samuel Cranston
William Stutfield	White	40	M	July 19, 1723	Newport	Piracy		Samuel Cranston
Owen Rice	White	27	M	July 19, 1723	Newport	Piracy		Samuel Cranston
William Rhad	White	35	M	July 19, 1723	Newport	Piracy		Samuel Cranston
Thomas Hazel	White		M	July 19, 1723	Newport	Piracy		Samuel Cranston
John Bright	White		M	July 19, 1723	Newport	Piracy		Samuel Cranston
Joseph Libbey	White		M	July 19, 1723	Newport	Piracy		Samuel Cranston
Thomas Powest	White	21	M	July 19, 1723	Newport	Piracy		Samuel Cranston
John Waters	White	35	M	July 19, 1723	Newport	Piracy		Samuel Cranston
Peter Westcott	Native American		M	April 23, 1725	Newport	Murder	Phillip, Native American	Samuel Cranston
Ann	Native American		F	November 4, 1737	Newport	Murder	Female, 13, white	John Wanton
Francis Baudoine	White		M	November 3, 1738	Newport	Piracy		John Wanton
Peter LeGrand	White		M	November 3, 1738	Newport	Piracy		John Wanton
Peter Jesseau	White		M	November 3, 1738	Newport	Piracy		John Wanton
Thomas Carter	White		M	May 10, 1751	Washington	Murder-Robbery	William Jackson, white	William Greene
John Absalom	Native American	60	M	November 18, 1757	Providence	Murder	Male, white	William Greene
Samuel Parks	White	28	M	August 21, 1760	Newport	Piracy		Stephen Hopkins
Benjamin Hawkins	White	22	M	August 21, 1760	Newport	Piracy		Stephen Hopkins
Fortune Price	Black		M	May 14, 1762	Newport	Arson		Samuel Ward
John Sherman	White		M	November 16, 1764	Newport	Burglary		Stephen Hopkins
Caesar Hazard	Black		M	November 25, 1771	Washington	Attempted murder	Benjamin Deeling, white	Joseph Wanton
Daniel Wilson	White		M	April 29, 1774	Providence			Nicholas Cooke
John Hart	White		M	May 17, 1777	Providence (Military)	Treason		Nicholas Cooke
John Fretter	White		M	May 28, 1778	Providence (Military)	Desertion	N/A	William Greene
John Bushby	White		M	November 23, 1778	Providence (Military)	Desertion	N/A	William Greene
James Duncan	White		M	September 19, 1780	Newport (Military)	Desertion	N/A	William Greene
Unknown	White		M	June 1, 1781	Newport (Military)	Attempted murder		William Greene
Thomas Mount	White	27	M	May 27, 1791	Washington	Burglary		Arthur Fenner
David Comstock	White		M	May 27, 1791	Providence (Note: Crime committed in Gloucester, Massachusetts.)	Murder	Ephraim Bacon, white	Arthur Fenner
Hopkins Hudson	White		M	October 26, 1798	Providence	Murder	Rufus Randall, white	Arthur Fenner
Amasa Walmsley	White (Note: 1/4th Native American ("son of a half-blood Indian").)		M	June 1, 1832	Providence	Murder	John Burke and Hannah Frank, white and mixed (Note: Mulatta.)	Lemuel H. Arnold
Amos Miner	White		M	December 27, 1833	Providence	Murder	John Smith, white (deputy)	John Brown Francis
Charles Brown	Black		M	December 27, 1833	Providence	Highway robbery		John Brown Francis
John Gordon	White	30	M	February 13, 1845	Providence	Murder-Robbery	Amasa Sprague, 45, white	James Fenner

== See also ==
- Capital punishment in Rhode Island
- Capital punishment in the United States
