= Capital punishment in Rhode Island =

Rhode Island was one of the earliest states in the United States to abolish capital punishment, having abolished it for all crimes in 1852. The death penalty was reintroduced in 1872, but it was never carried out before being abolished again in 1984. Of all the states, Rhode Island has had the longest period with no executions, none having taken place since 1845. Nobody has been sentenced to death in Rhode Island since 1975.

Rhode Island performed 53 executions from 1670 to February 13, 1845, but only eight took place after statehood. Half of the executions occurred on July 19, 1723, when 26 sailors were hanged for piracy. Rhode Island has never executed a woman.

Hanging was the most commonly used form of execution; one execution was carried out by hanging, drawing and quartering, while another was carried out by hanging and gibbeting. The gas chamber was authorized in 1973, but was never used. In 1984, Rhode Island established law current with the United States Constitution that capital punishment is a form of cruel and unusual punishment and is illegal.

== History of abolitions ==
In January 1838, a report entitled "Report of the Committee On the Abolishment of Capital Punishments" was made by the General Assembly Committee to Revise the Penal Code. The recommendation was to abolish capital punishment. On December 31, 1843, Amasa Sprague, the brother of former Rhode Island Governor William Sprague and one of the wealthiest and most powerful industrialists in the state, was murdered. In January 1844, the General Assembly abolished capital punishment for all crimes except murder and arson. In March 1844, John, Nicholas, and William Gordon were indicted for the murder. Nicholas had been involved in a dispute with Sprague over the renewal of the Gordons' liquor license.

The Gordons, who were Irish Catholics, received the support of the state labor movement, which consisted primarily of Irish and Italian immigrants. The labor movement saw the trial as part of their struggle against the commercially and politically powerful industrialists represented by the Sprague family. At the trial in 1844, Nicholas and William Gordon were found to have ironclad alibis, but considerable circumstantial evidence was presented against John. The most damaging testimony was given by witnesses who identified a gun found near the victim as belonging to the Gordons. They could not produce their gun during the trial, but it was found afterward in their home. Nicholas and William were acquitted, but John was convicted and sentenced to death. His conviction was appealed to the House of Representatives, which denied it by a vote of 36 to 27. It was then appealed to Governor James Fenner, who reviewed the conviction but refused to intercede.

John Gordon was hanged on February 14, 1845. It was the last execution in Rhode Island. Sheriff Roger Williams Potter, who carried out the execution of Gordon, reported that Gordon admitted to being an accomplice to the murder of Amasa Sprague. However, Gordon also said "he had not shed any of Amasa Sprague's blood."

On January 23, 1852, after seven years of discussion and debate concerning Gordon’s conviction and the merits of capital punishment, the Senate Committee on Education issued a report. The report contained literary references to the death penalty, and outlined U.S. and European practices regarding it. On February 11, 1852, the Rhode Island General Assembly abolished capital punishment.

The death penalty was reinstated in 1872 for murders committed while under sentence of life imprisonment, but no one was ever executed under this provision.

On June 26, 1973, the Rhode Island General Assembly instituted the penalty of death by gas inhalation for murders committed during confinement in state correctional institutions. However, in 1979, the Rhode Island Supreme Court ruled that the mandatory death sentence provisions of Chapter 280 (RI General Laws 11-23-2) violated the "cruel and unusual punishment" clause of the 8th amendment to the U.S. Constitution. Consequently, the sentences of the only two death row inmates in the state, Sidney Clark and Robert Cline; were reducedto life in prison.

Finally, on May 9, 1984, the General Assembly enacted Public Law Chapter 221, which removed the mandatory death sentence language from RI General Law section 11-23-2. Many pieces of legislation have been introduced since then to reinstate the death penalty for specific crimes, but none have passed.

== Timeline ==
- November 2, 1670: First execution (Thomas Flounders, hanged for murder)
- February 14, 1845: Last execution (John Gordon, hanged for murder; posthumously pardoned in 2011)
- February 11, 1852: Capital punishment abolished
- 1872: Capital punishment reinstated
- May 9, 1984: Capital punishment abolished

Authorized methods of execution:

- 1670–1852; 1872–1984: hanging (51)
- 1973–1984: gas inhalation (0)

== See also ==
- List of people executed in Rhode Island
- Capital punishment in the United States
