= Peter F. Martin =

American politician

Member of the Rhode Island House of Representatives from the 75th district
- In office 6 January 2009 – 6 January 2015
- Preceded by: Steven J. Coaty (R-75)
- Succeeded by: Lauren H. Carson

Personal details
- Born: May 3, 1941 (age 85) Newport, Rhode Island
- Party: Democratic
- Education: Providence College, Boston College; Bryant University
- Profession: Retired Software Application and Product Marketing Consultant

Peter F. Martin (born 1941) is an American politician who was a Democratic member of the Rhode Island House of Representatives. He represented the 75th District Newport from January 2009 to January 2015. He primarily served on the House Committees on Judiciary and Veteran’s Affairs. During his earlier terms of office he has served on the House Committees on Small Business, Separation of Powers, Municipal Government, and Government Oversight.

In August 2010, Martin was appointed to a three-year term as the Rhode Island Legislative Commissioner on the Atlantic States Marine Fisheries Commission.

== Early life and education ==
Martin graduated from Providence College with a Bachelor of Arts in 1964 and from Bryant College with an MBA in 1977.

== Career ==
=== Politician ===
During the 2011 legislative session, Martin was successful in obtaining a pardon for John Gordon, an Irish immigrant who was hanged in 1845 for the murder of Amasa Sprague, a Rhode Island mill owner. The pardon was granted and signed by Governor Lincoln Chafee based on a House Judiciary Committee hearing in which conclusive evidence was presented that John Gordon had been given an unfair hearing by a prejudiced court.

In addition to this pardon, Martin was able to get legislation passed to assist the Rhode Island Internet Crimes Against Children Task Force to expedite its investigation of traders of child pornography and other cybercrimes.

In June 2011, Martin was awarded the 2011 Legislative of the Year Award by the National Association of Social Workers, Rhode Island Chapter. Martin was chosen for "his consistent work in the legislature for matters of importance to the association and especially for his legislative and personal efforts in the areas of homelessness and mental health issues". A former student at the Boston College School of Social Work, he served for many years on the board of directors at the Newport County Community Mental Health Center.

In the 2012 legislation session, Martin introduced a bill which would honor military veterans by allowing them to request that their status as an honorably discharged veteran be imprinted on either their operator's license or their state issued identification card. The bill was passed by the House and Senate. It was signed by Chafee and became effective on September 1, 2012. By the end of 2014, 9041 veterans had taken advantage of this opportunity.

=== Author ===
In April 2013, Martin was awarded a plaque as the Legislator of the Year at the 78th Annual Disabled American Veterans Department Convention in Warwick, Rhode Island. Martin submitted a resolution honoring 2nd Lt. Robert Thorpe, a World War II veteran who was killed on May 27, 1944. This led to Thorpe being posthumously awarded the Rhode Island Star, the highest military honor conveyed by Rhode Island. As a result, Martin was invited to speak at the 2013 Reunion of the 39th Fighter Squadron in October 2013 at San Antonio, Texas.

Martin ended his six years of service in the Rhode Island House of Representatives in January 2015. Following his retirement from the House of Representatives Martin worked with author Ken Dooley on producing a book, Relentless Pursuit - The Untold Story of the U.S. 5th Air Force's 39th Fighter Squadron. The book is based on the World War II experiences of 2nd Lt. Robert Thorpe and the other members of the 39th Fighter Squadron.

=== Musician ===
Starting in his early 50s, Peter Martin started playing blues harmonicas. He has 'sat in' with other performers and groups during his travels in Chicago, San Francisco, New Orleans, Providence and Newport, RI gaining him the nick name of "Harmonica Pete". He has played with various Rhode Island based Irish music groups. He is currently a member of the Young Geezers, a music group which makes regular performances at the Rhode Island Veterans Home in Bristol, RI and other 'volunteer' venues.

Peter is also a pianist. He currently plays jazz and blues tunes on a regular basis for the enjoyment of visitors at a local hospital. He was hired to perform weekly at the Newport Marriott Hotel from July 2019 to January 2020. After a year of COVID isolation, he will be playing for April 2021 at the Marble House as a volunteer for the Preservation Society of Newport.

== Board memberships ==
Martin is a member of the board of directors and the webmaster of the Museum of Newport Irish History in Newport, Rhode Island. He is also a member of the Rhode Island Irish Famine Memorial committee in Providence.
