= Albert C. Greene =

American politician

Albert Collins Greene
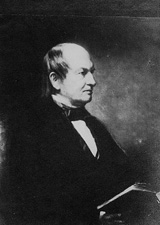

United States Senator from Rhode Island
- In office March 4, 1845 – March 3, 1851
- Preceded by: John B. Francis
- Succeeded by: Charles T. James

49th Attorney General of Rhode Island
- In office 1825–1843
- Governor: James Fenner; Lemuel H. Arnold; John B. Francis; William Sprague III; Samuel Ward King
- Preceded by: Dutee J. Pearce
- Succeeded by: Joseph M. Blake

Member of the Rhode Island House of Representatives
- In office 1815–1825

Member of the Rhode Island Senate
- In office 1843–1844

Personal details
- Born: April 15, 1792 East Greenwich, Rhode Island, U.S.
- Died: January 8, 1863 (aged 70) Providence, Rhode Island, U.S.
- Resting place: Grace Church Cemetery
- Citizenship: US
- Party: Whig
- Spouse(s): Catherine Celia Greene; Julia Bourne Greene
- Relations: Nathanael Greene; William Greene; Richard Ward Greene
- Children: William Albert Greene; Mary Eliza Greene; Ann Frances Greene; Catharine Celia Greene; Susan Eliza Greene
- Parent(s): Perry Greene; Elizabeth (Belcher) Greene
- Education: Kent Academy; Litchfield Law School; Brown University
- Profession: Politician, Lawyer

Albert Collins Greene (April 15, 1792 – January 8, 1863) was an American lawyer and politician from Rhode Island. He served as a United States senator and Attorney General of Rhode Island.

== Early life ==
Greene was born in East Greenwich, Rhode Island and graduated from Kent Academy. He studied law, was admitted to the bar in 1812, and completed his legal training at the Litchfield Law School in Litchfield, Connecticut, from 1812 to 1813. He commenced the practice of law in East Greenwich.

== Political career ==
He was a member of the Rhode Island House of Representatives from 1815 to 1825, serving as speaker of the State House from 1821 to 1825. He was brigadier general, and then major general, of the Fourth Brigade of State Militia from 1816 to 1823. He served as attorney general of Rhode Island from 1825 to 1843. In 1827, he received the honorary degree of Master of Arts from Brown University.

Greene was a member of the Rhode Island Senate from 1843 to 1844, and was elected as a Whig candidate to the U.S. Senate, serving from March 4, 1845, to March 3, 1851; he was not a candidate for reelection, and was elected to the Rhode Island Senate in 1851 and 1852. In 1857, he was again a member of the Rhode Island House of Representatives.

He retired from public life, and died in Providence; interment was in Grace Church Cemetery.

== Family life ==
Greene was the son of Perry Greene and Elizabeth (Belcher) Greene. On May 16, 1814, Greene married Catherine Celia Greene, daughter of Rhode Island Governor William Greene. He and Catherine had five children: William Albert Greene, Mary Eliza Greene, Ann Frances Greene, Catharine Celia Greene and Susan Eliza Greene. Their daughter Catherine married Richard Ward Greene, Chief Justice of the Rhode Island Supreme Court. After his wife Catherine died, he married Julia Bourne on August 22, 1841.

Greene's uncle was Nathanael Greene, a major general of the Continental Army in the American Revolutionary War.

Legal offices
Preceded by Dutee J. Pearce	Attorney General of Rhode Island; 1825–1843	Succeeded by Joseph M. Blake
U.S. Senate
Preceded by John B. Francis	U.S. senator (Class 1) from Rhode Island; March 4, 1845 – March 3, 1851; Served alongside: James F. Simmons and John H. Clarke	Succeeded by Charles T. James
