= Governor Francis =

Governor Francis may refer to:

- David R. Francis (1850–1927), 27th Governor of Missouri
- John Brown Francis (1791–1864), 13th Governor of Rhode Island
