= 1835 Rhode Island gubernatorial election =

- April 15, 1835
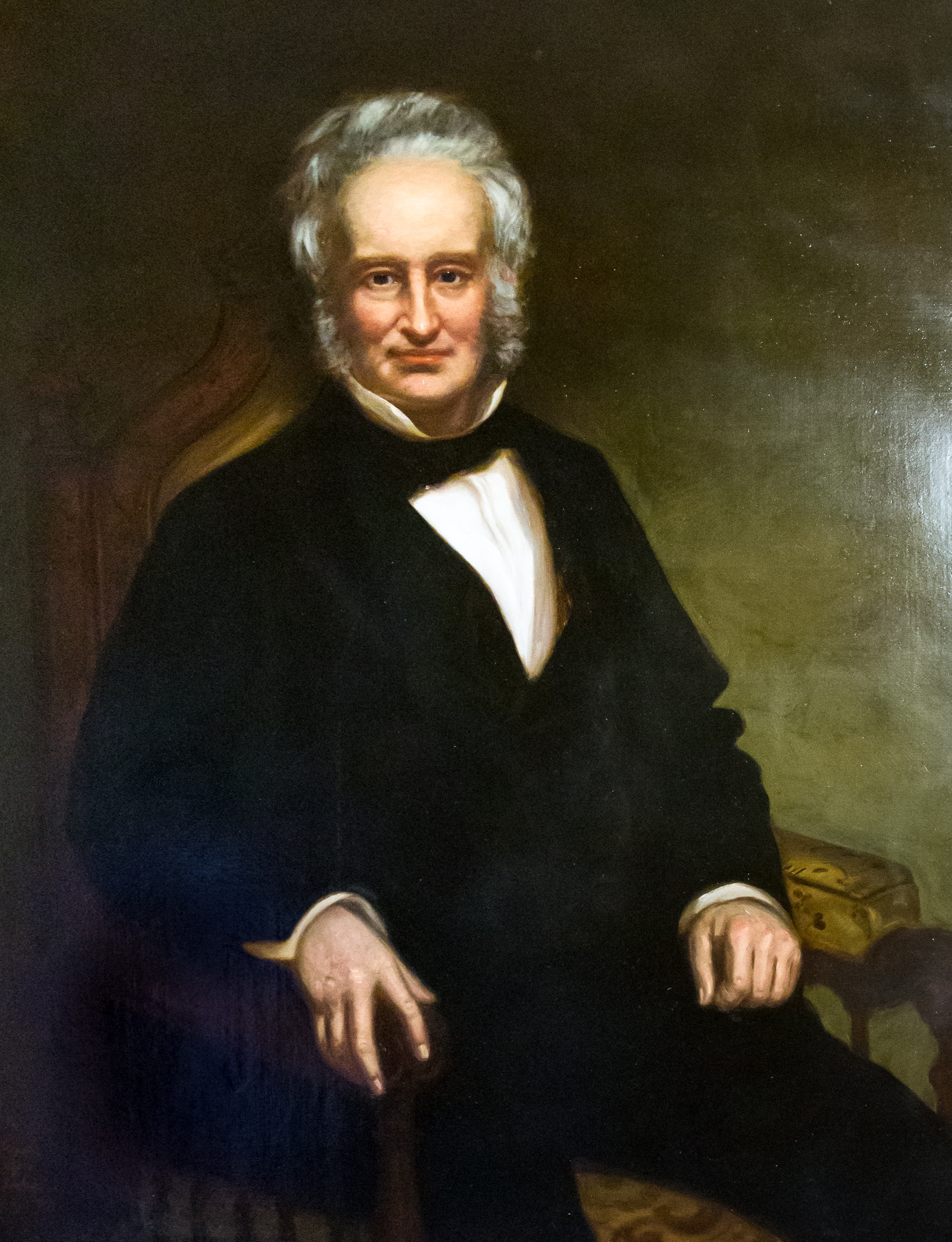

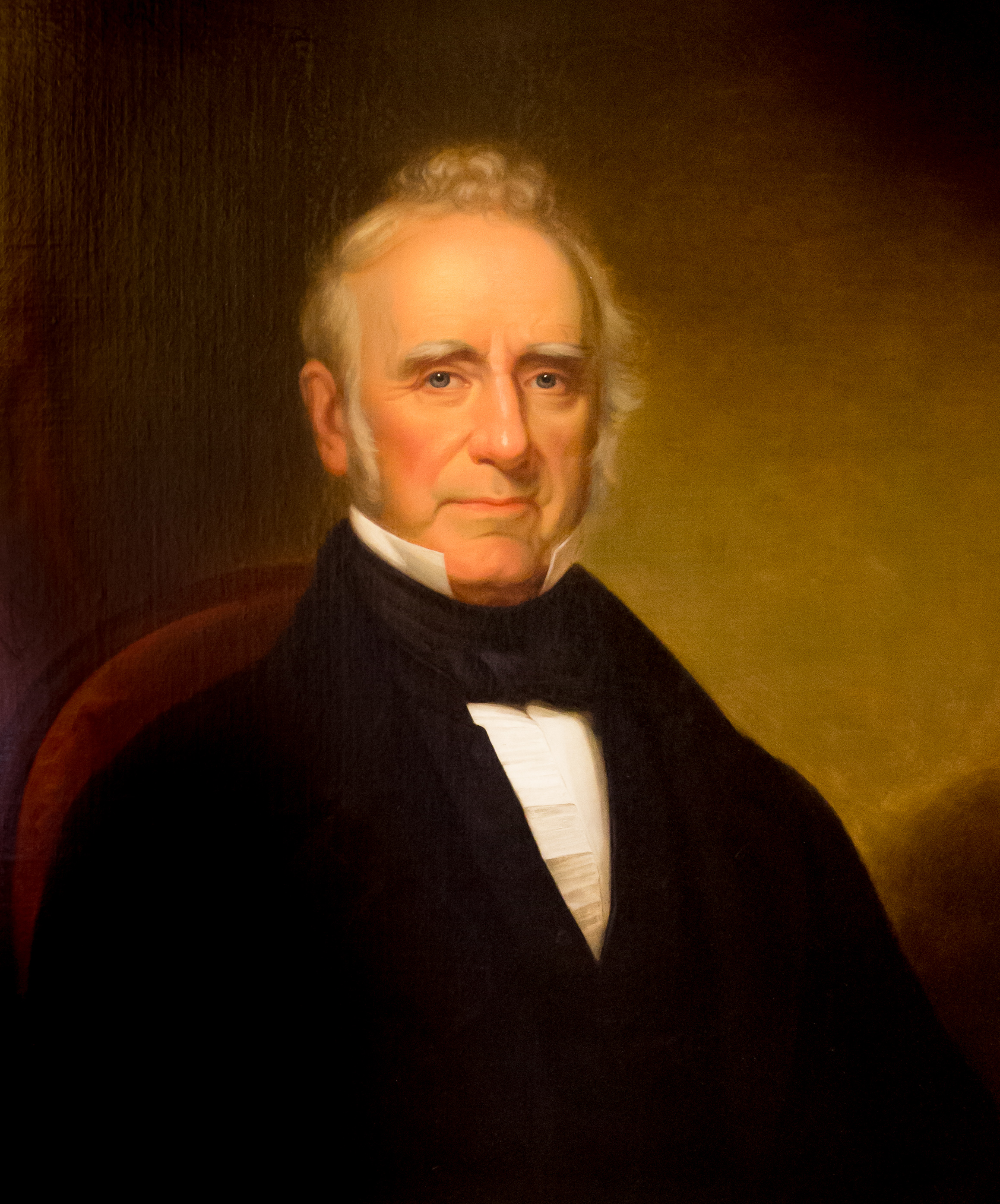
Nominee	John Brown Francis	Nehemiah R. Knight
Party	Democratic	Whig
Popular vote	3,880	3,774
Percentage	50.67%	49.28%
- County results Francis: 50–60% 60–70% Knight: 50–60%
Governor before election
John Brown Francis
Democratic
Elected Governor
John Brown Francis
Democratic

The 1835 Rhode Island gubernatorial election was held on April 15, 1835.

Incumbent Democratic governor John Brown Francis won re-election to a third term, defeating Whig nominee Nehemiah R. Knight in a re-match of the previous year's election.

== General election ==
=== Candidates ===
- John Brown Francis, Democratic, incumbent governor
- Nehemiah R. Knight, Whig, incumbent U.S. senator, former governor

=== Results ===
1835 Rhode Island gubernatorial election
Party	Candidate	Votes	%	±%
Democratic	John Brown Francis (incumbent)	3,880	50.67%	
Whig	Nehemiah R. Knight	3,774	49.28%	
Scattering		4	0.05%	
Majority		106	1.38%	
Turnout		7,658		
Democratic hold		Swing		
