= Nathan F. Dixon I =

American politician (1774–1842)

Nathan Fellows Dixon
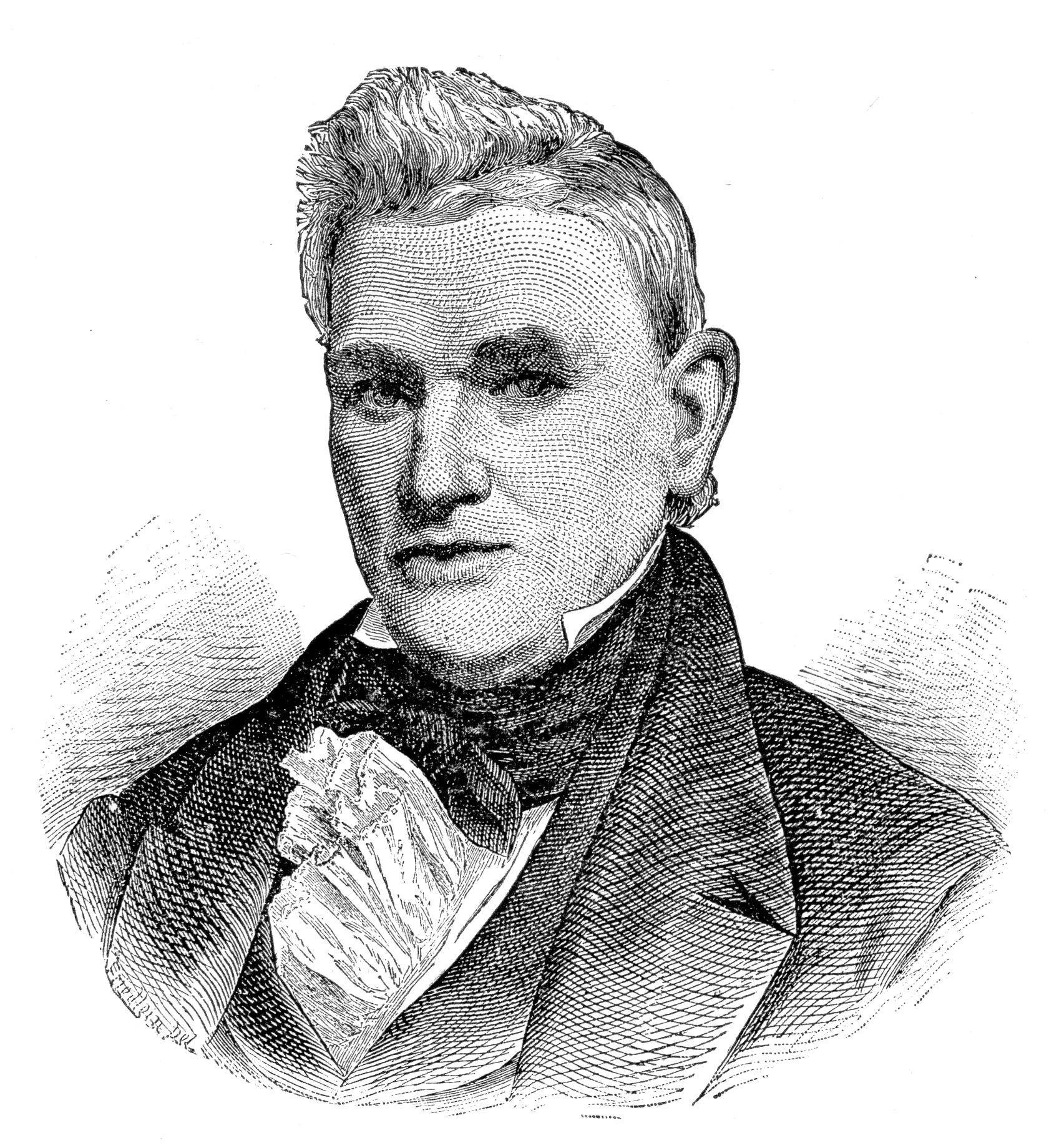

United States Senator from Rhode Island
- In office March 4, 1839 – January 29, 1842
- Preceded by: Asher Robbins
- Succeeded by: William Sprague

Member of the Rhode Island House of Representatives
- In office 1813
- In office 1830

Personal details
- Born: December 13, 1774 Plainfield, Connecticut Colony, British America
- Died: January 29, 1842 (aged 67) Washington, D.C., U.S.
- Party: Whig

Nathan Fellows Dixon (December 13, 1774 – January 29, 1842) was a United States senator from Rhode Island. Born in Plainfield, Connecticut, he attended Plainfield Academy and graduated from the College of Rhode Island and Providence Plantations (the former name of Brown University) at Providence in 1799. He studied law, was admitted to the bar in 1801 and commenced practice in New London County, Connecticut. He moved to Westerly, Rhode Island, in 1802 and continued the practice of law, and also engaged in banking, serving as president of the Washington bank of Westerly from 1829 until his death.

Dixon was a member of the Rhode Island House of Representatives from 1813 and 1830, and served as a colonel in the state militia. He was elected as a Whig to the U.S. Senate and served from March 4, 1839, until his death in Washington, D.C., in 1842. While in the Senate, he was chairman of the Committee on Revolutionary Claims (Twenty-seventh Congress). Interment in River Bend Cemetery, Westerly, Rhode Island.

Dixon's son Nathan Fellows Dixon was a U.S. representative and his grandson Nathan Fellows Dixon III was a U.S. representative and senator, all from Rhode Island.

== See also ==
- List of members of the United States Congress who died in office (1790–1899)

U.S. Senate
Preceded by Asher Robbins	U.S. senator (Class 1) from Rhode Island; 1839–1842; Served alongside: Nehemiah R. Knight, James F. Simmons	Succeeded by William Sprague III
