= Richard Ward Greene =

American judge

Richard Ward Greene (January 21, 1792 – March 14, 1875), was an American attorney, having graduated from Brown University and having studied law at Litchfield College and under Boston lawyer Ebenezer Rockwell. He was appointed U.S. attorney for Rhode Island in 1826 and also served in both houses of the state legislature. In May 1848 was elected as Chief Justice of the Rhode Island Supreme Court. He resigned on June 14, 1854. His nephew, Albert Collins Greene, was a U.S. Senator from Rhode Island. His uncle was the Revolutionary War General, Nathanael Greene.

Born at Potowomut, Rhode Island, Greene was the son of Christopher Greene and Deborah Ward. He married Katherine Celia Greene on November 12, 1851.

He died on March 14, 1875, in Providence, Rhode Island. In his will he left US$75,000 to the Methodist Episcopal Sunday Schools.
