= 1834 Rhode Island gubernatorial election =

- April 16, 1834
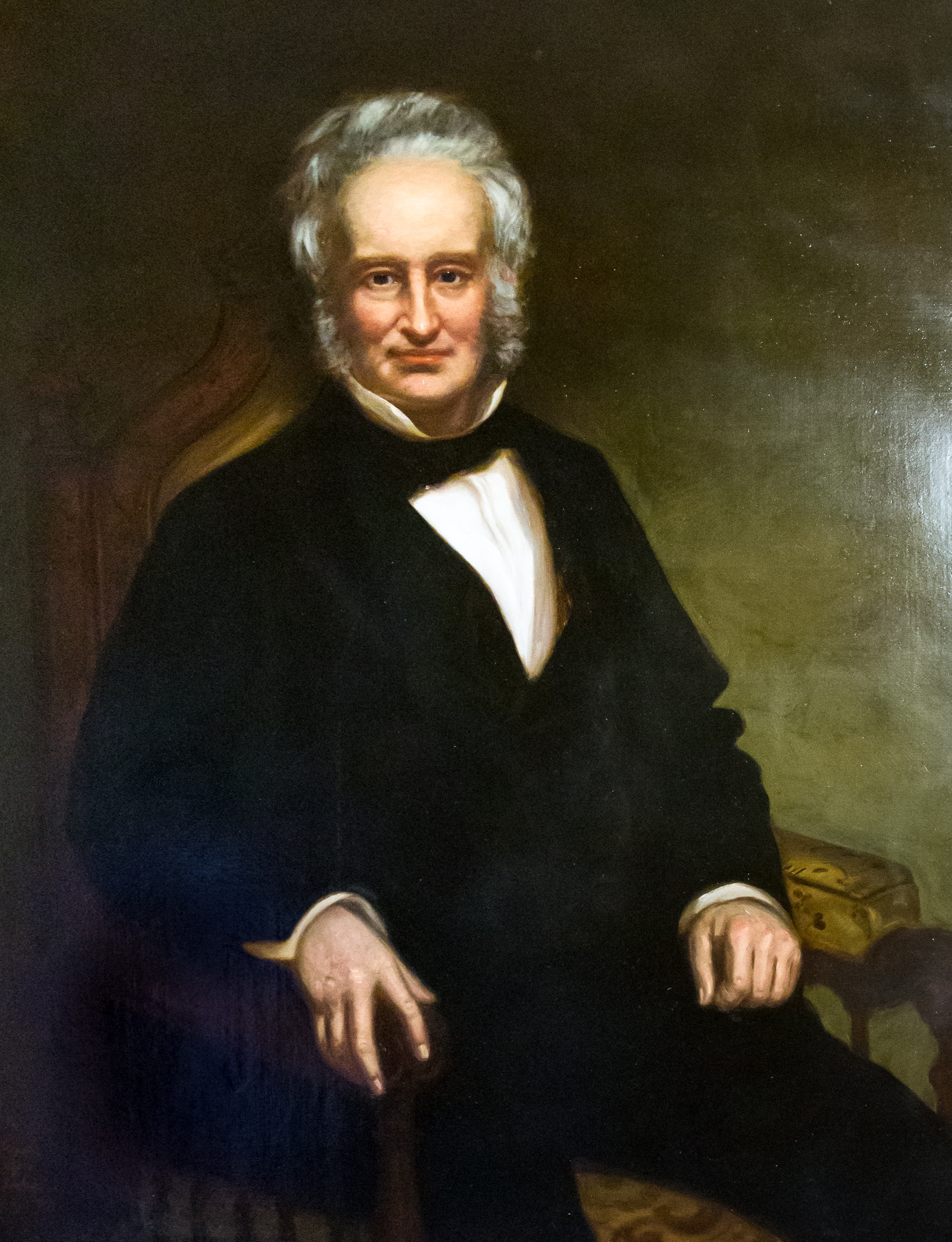

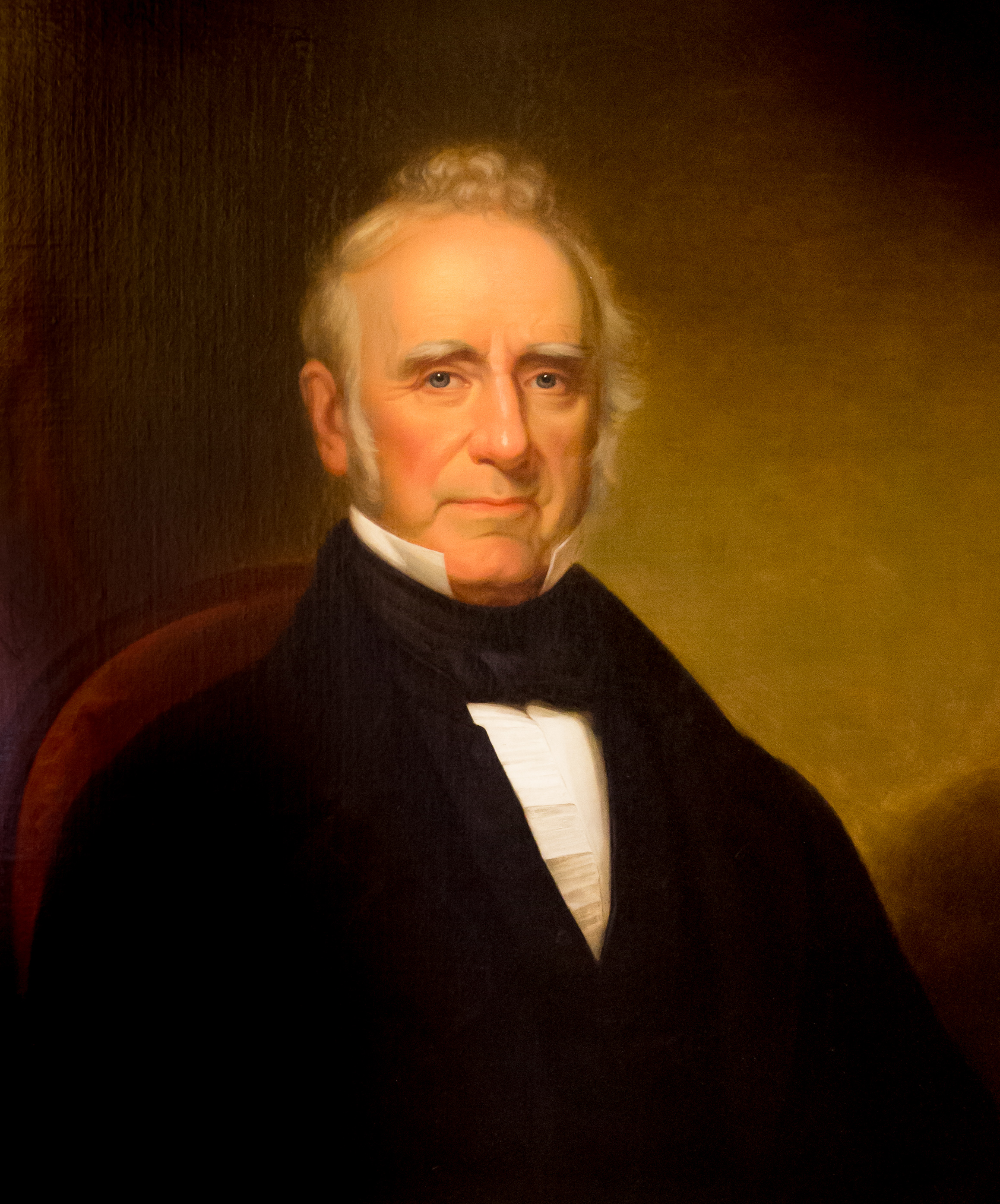
Nominee	John Brown Francis	Nehemiah R. Knight
Party	Democratic	Whig
Popular vote	3,676	3,520
Percentage	51.04%	48.88%
- County results Francis: 60–70% Knight: 50–60% 70–80%
Governor before election
John Brown Francis
Democratic
Elected Governor
John Brown Francis
Democratic

The 1834 Rhode Island gubernatorial election was held on April 16, 1834.

Incumbent Democratic governor John Brown Francis won re-election to a second term, defeating Whig nominee Nehemiah R. Knight.

== General election ==
=== Candidates ===
- John Brown Francis, Democratic, incumbent governor
- Nehemiah R. Knight, Whig, incumbent U.S. senator, former governor

=== Results ===
1834 Rhode Island gubernatorial election
Party	Candidate	Votes	%	±%
Democratic	John Brown Francis (incumbent)	3,676	51.04%	
Whig	Nehemiah R. Knight	3,520	48.88%	
Scattering		6	0.08%	
Majority		156	2.16%	
Turnout		7,202		
Democratic hold		Swing		
