= Charles Tillinghast James =

American engineer and senator (1805–1862)

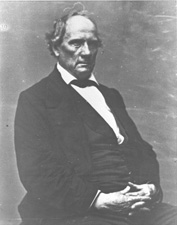

United States Senator from Rhode Island
- In office March 4, 1851 – March 3, 1857
- Preceded by: Albert C. Greene
- Succeeded by: James F. Simmons

Personal details
- Born: September 15, 1805 West Greenwich, Rhode Island, US
- Died: October 17, 1862 (aged 57) Sag Harbor, New York, US
- Resting place: Swan Point Cemetery, Providence, Rhode Island
- Party: Democratic
- Spouse: Lucinda James
- Profession: Manufacturing engineer

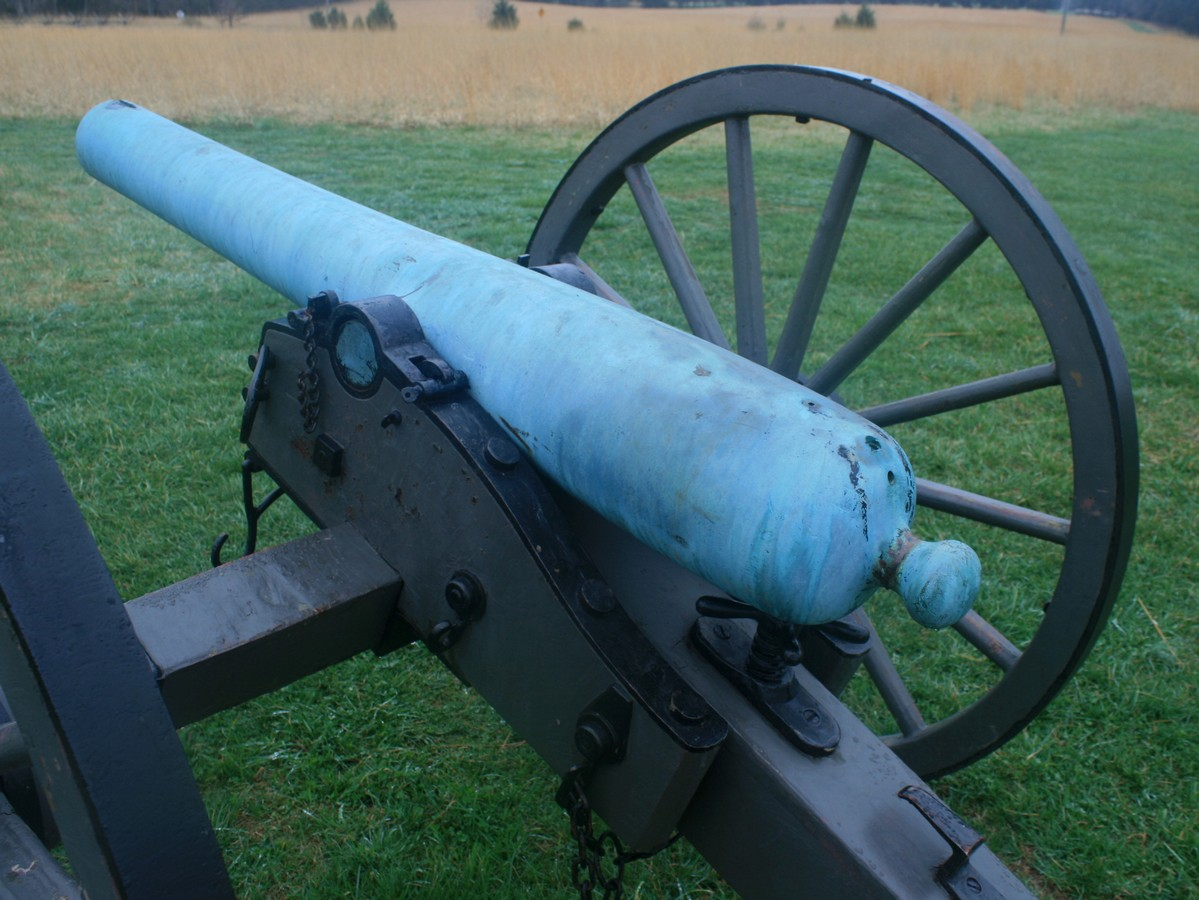
A 14-pounder (3.8-inch) James rifle on the First Bull Run battlefield, the only weapon entirely designed by James adopted by the US Army.

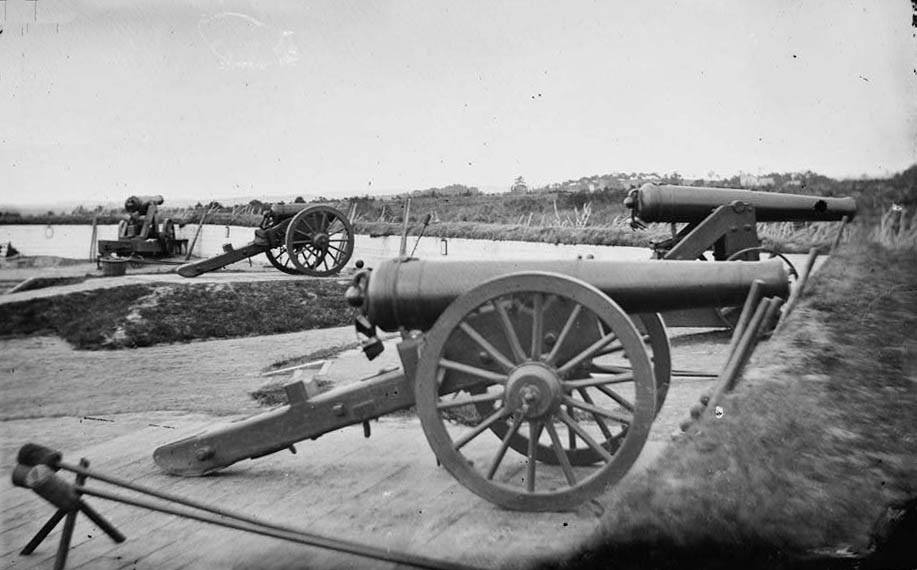
Two Model 1829 32-pounder seacoast guns, rifled by the James method (sometimes called 64-pdr James rifles). The one in the foreground is on a siege carriage. The one behind is on an iron, front pintle, barbette carriage.

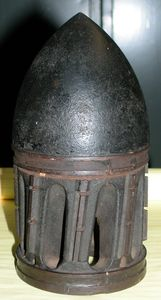
A James pattern solid shot. The “birdcage” at the base would have been covered by sheet lead which, upon firing the gun, would have expanded into the grooves of the rifling.

Charles Tillinghast James (September 15, 1805 – October 17, 1862) was a consulting manufacturing engineer, early proponent of steam mills (especially cotton mills), and United States Democratic Senator from the state of Rhode Island from 1851 to 1857.

== Family ==
Charles T. James was born in West Greenwich, Rhode Island on September 15, 1805, the son of Silas James and Phebe Tillinghast James. Silas was a local judge, and the Tillinghast name was an old and respected one in New England. He married Lucinda Waite James and they had four children, Abby, Charles Tillinghast, Lucinda Elizabeth, and Walter. Abby married Colonel John Stanton Slocum of the 2nd Rhode Island Infantry; he was killed in action at the First Battle of Bull Run on July 21, 1861.

== Education and early experience ==
Charles T. James had a largely self-taught knowledge of mathematics and mechanics, and received an honorary Master of Arts degree from Brown College in 1838. He was particularly interested in textile machinery. In the early 1830s he worked in small mills in the Quinebaug Valley of Connecticut, later supervising the startup of mills in the Providence area. His reputation had grown such that by 1834 Samuel Slater brought him to Providence to overhaul the Steam Cotton Manufacturing Company mill, built in 1828 as the first large American steam-powered mill. This work made James realize the potential of steam mills, and he became a leading engineer and advocate of them, particularly in coastal towns and the South.

== Mechanical engineering career ==
James was successful in designing and promoting steam mills for small seaport towns; these generally had no experience with mills and needed his expertise in factory design and equipment selection. James researched the best equipment and manufacturers; the equipment he specified included pickers, breaker cards, drawing heads, Providence Machine fly frames, Mason finished cards, and spinning equipment looms. James preferred steam engines from Providence's India Point Works, owned 1843–1846 by Fairbanks, Bancroft and Company, which later became Corliss, Nightingale and Company. He promoted steam mills in seaports that had seen a great reduction in business because of the centralization of trade in bigger ports such as Boston. This occurred due to the centralizing technology of canals such as the Middlesex Canal, the rapid growth of railroads, and bigger ships. These "decayed" smaller seaports such as Newburyport and Salem would be able to get coal and cotton supplies directly from the ships and export their steam mill products directly by ship again.

In 1839–1846 Charles T. James owned the southern half of the Brewster-Coffin House (High St.) in Newburyport, Massachusetts. During this time he worked on several steam mill projects in the area. Steam mills promoted by Charles T. James in Newburyport included the Barlett Mill, the James Steam Mill (built in 1843 with 17,000 spindles) and the Globe (later Peabody) Steam Mill (built in 1846 with 12,200 spindles). He also promoted mills in Portsmouth, New Hampshire 1845-6, the Naumkeag Steam Cotton Mill in Salem, Massachusetts, the Essex steam mill, and the Conestoga Steam Mill in Lancaster, Pennsylvania in 1844-45. Later he was closely involved with the Graniteville Mill in South Carolina with William Gregg.

At some time James achieved the rank of major general in the Rhode Island militia, probably in the 1840s.

== United States Senator ==
James was elected to the US senate as a Democrat in 1850. While there he chaired the Senate Committee on Patents and the Patent Office and the Senate Committee on Public Buildings, and advocated for protective tariffs. He did not stand for reelection and left when his term ended in 1857, reportedly due to financial difficulties.

== Civil War and death ==
James developed a family of early rifled projectiles and a rifling system for artillery that saw use by the Union Army in the American Civil War. The weapon most correctly called a James rifle is a 3.8 in (97 mm) weapon commonly called a 14-pounder James rifle, usually made of bronze; this was the only gun designed entirely by James that saw extensive service. Except for the material, it closely resembles the wrought iron 3-inch Ordnance rifle that saw more widespread use. His rifling system was used to convert pre-war smoothbore M1841 6-pounder field guns, 32-pounder, 42-pounder, and other weapons to rifles firing his projectiles; in some Civil War-era documents these are also called "James rifles". Large-caliber guns with his rifling system and projectiles, along with Parrott rifles, were used in the breaching of Fort Pulaski in April 1862; this was probably James' most significant contribution to the war. After the war, the rapid reduction of Fort Pulaski was used to justify stopping work on masonry forts and led to a brief period of new construction of earthwork forts.

On October 16, 1862, during the demonstration of a projectile at Sag Harbor, Long Island, New York, a worker attempted to remove a cap from a shell. It exploded, killing the man and mortally wounding James, who died the next day. Following his death, few of his weapons were produced. His projectiles were gradually replaced with Hotchkiss projectiles due to stripping of the lead sabot.

== Legacy ==
Over 150 14-pounder James rifles survive, many of them at Shiloh National Military Park, Tennessee, including over 50 6-pounder weapons bored out to 3.8 inches and rifled. Other heavy guns with James rifling survive as well. A portrait of Charles T. James is in the collection of the National Portrait Gallery, and a bust is in the Smithsonian American Art Museum collection, both in Washington, D.C.

There is an iron rifled 14-pounder artillery piece, used by James in experiments at Napatree Point in Watch Hill, Rhode Island, in the collection of the Newport Artillery Company.

U.S. Senate
Preceded by Albert C. Greene	U.S. senator (Class 1) from Rhode Island; March 4, 1851 – March 3, 1857; Served alongside: John H. Clarke and Philip Allen	Succeeded by James F. Simmons
