= Nathaniel Bullock =

American politician

Lieutenant Governor of Rhode Island
- In office 1842–1843
- Governor: Samuel Ward King
- Preceded by: Byron Diman
- Succeeded by: Byron Diman

Personal details
- Born: Nat McDonald Bullock; May 1, 1777 Bristol, Rhode Island
- Died: November 13, 1867 (aged 90) Bristol, Rhode Island, U.S.
- Party: Democratic-Republican; Democratic

Nathaniel Bullock (May 1, 1777 – November 13, 1867) was an American lawyer and politician. He held the position of lieutenant governor of Rhode Island, and Speaker of the Rhode Island House of Representatives.

Bullock was born to Samuel Bullock (1737-1821) and Silence (Bowen) Bullock (1744-1825) and was part of a prominent extended family in New England. Jonathan Russell Bullock was his son. He graduated from Brown University in 1798.

Bullock ran for governor in 1839, placing second in an election where no candidate received a majority and the office was filled in an acting capacity by Samuel Ward King. He served as Rhode Island's lieutenant governor in 1842 and 1843.

The Library of Congress has a campaign broadside including him on the Democratic Republican and "Farmers' Prox." 1840 ticket.

He was involved with Freeman's Bank and the construction of its bank building in Bristol.

Party political offices
Preceded by John Brown Francis	Democratic nominee for Governor of Rhode Island; 1839	Succeeded by Thomas F. Carpenter
