= James F. Simmons =

American politician (1795–1864)

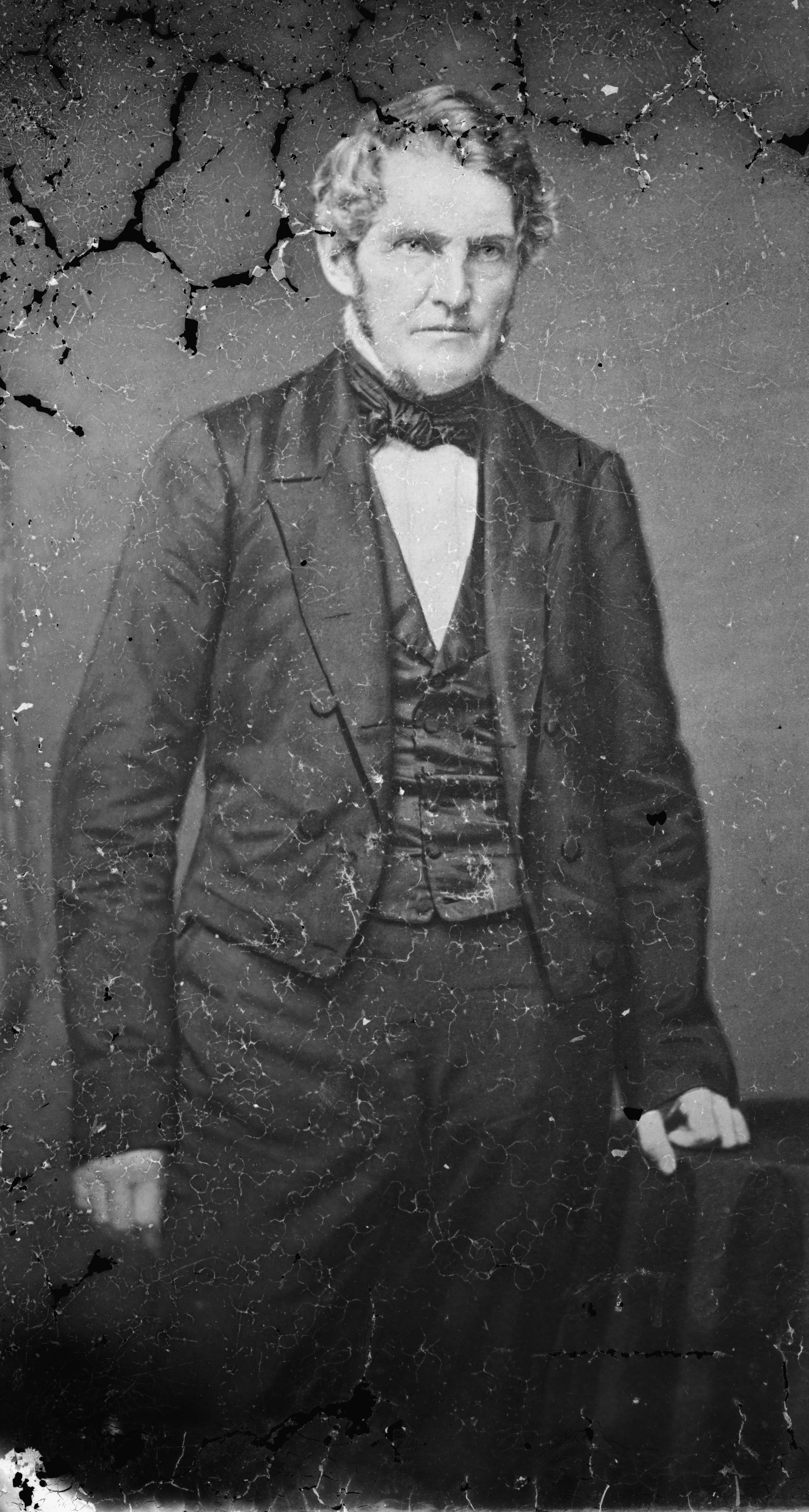
- Simmons, 1855–1865

United States Senator from Rhode Island
- In office March 4, 1857 – September 5, 1862
- Preceded by: Charles James
- Succeeded by: Samuel G. Arnold
- In office March 4, 1841 – March 3, 1847
- Preceded by: Nehemiah R. Knight
- Succeeded by: John Clarke

Member of the Rhode Island House of Representatives
- In office 1828–1841

Personal details
- Born: James Fowler Simmons; September 10, 1795 Little Compton, Rhode Island, U.S.
- Died: July 10, 1864 (aged 68) Johnston, Rhode Island, U.S.
- Party: Whig (Before 1854); Republican (1854–1864)

James Fowler Simmons (September 10, 1795 – July 10, 1864) was an American businessman and politician from Rhode Island who twice served as a United States senator, first as a Whig and then as a Republican.

He is notable for having the Senate consider expelling him for corruption during his second term as a Senator.

== Early life ==
Born on a farm near Little Compton, he attended a private school in Newport and moved to Providence in 1812. He was employed in various manufacturing concerns in Rhode Island and Massachusetts and engaged in the manufacture of yarn at Simmonsville (now Thornton), a village still existing in Johnston, RI, in 1822.

He moved to Johnston, Rhode Island in 1827 and resumed the manufacture of yarns and engaged in agricultural pursuits; he was a member of the Rhode Island House of Representatives from 1828 to 1841. His house still stands on Atwood Avenue.

== United States senator ==
Simmons was elected as a Whig to the U.S. Senate and served from March 4, 1841, to March 3, 1847.

While in the Senate, he was chairman of the Committee on Manufactures (Twenty-seventh and Twenty-eighth Congresses) and a member of the Committee on Printing (Twenty-seventh and Twenty-eighth Congresses).

== Post-Senate career ==
After running unsuccessfully for reelection in 1846, Simmons returned to Johnston and resumed his former pursuits. He was an unsuccessful candidate for the Senate in 1850.

== Return to the U.S. Senate ==
Simmons was again elected to the United States Senate in 1856 as a Republican and served from March 4, 1857, through the first year of the American Civil War. He was chairman of the Committee on Patents and the Patent Office during the Thirty-seventh Congress.

On July 12, 1862, Senator Joseph A. Wright of Indiana submitted a resolution calling for Simmons's expulsion. Wright stated that Secretary of War Edwin Stanton accused Simmons of securing a contract for two Rhode Island rifle manufacturers in exchange for a fee of $20,000 in promissory notes.

Following these accusations, Congress passed a law barring members of Congress from accepting fees for services before agencies of the United States government. On July 14, the Senate Judiciary Committee issued a report stating that it found Simmons' conduct "entirely inexcusable" but that charging Simmons would be an ex post facto violation of his rights, in that his conduct had occurred before the law prohibiting it was passed. The Committee recommended that the Senate do what it felt necessary. The Senate adjourned three days later, having taken no action in Simmons' case.

Simmons resigned on September 5, 1862, before the Senate could return for its December session and again take up the question of expelling him.

== Later life ==
After his resignation, Simmons resumed his former manufacturing pursuits.

== Death and burial ==
Simmons died in Johnston in 1864. He was buried at North End Cemetery in Providence.

== See also ==
- List of federal political scandals in the United States
- List of United States senators expelled or censured

U.S. Senate
Preceded by Nehemiah R. Knight	U.S. Senator (Class 2) from Rhode Island; 1841–1847; Served alongside: Nathan Dixon, William Sprague III, John Francis, Albert C. Greene	Succeeded by John Clarke
Preceded by Charles James	U.S. Senator (Class 1) from Rhode Island; 1857–1862; Served alongside: Philip Allen, Henry B. Anthony	Succeeded by Samuel G. Arnold
