= John Gordon (convict) =

Irish-American wrongful execution victim (1815–1845)

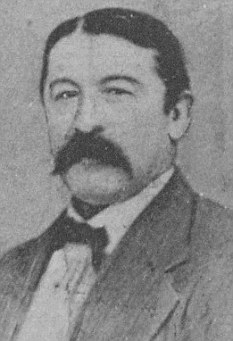
- Born: c. 1815; Ireland
- Died: February 14, 1845 (aged 29-30); Providence, Rhode Island, U.S.
- Known for: Last person to be executed in Rhode Island
- Status: Executed by hanging (February 13, 1845); Posthumously pardoned by Governor Lincoln Chafee (June 29, 2011)
- Conviction: Murder
- Penalty: Death

John Gordon (c. 1815 – February 14, 1845) was the last person executed by the U.S. state of Rhode Island. His conviction and execution have been ascribed by researchers to anti-Roman Catholic and anti-Irish immigrant bias. As a result, he was posthumously pardoned in 2011.

== Murder, trial, and execution ==
In 1844, Gordon was tried and convicted for the December 31, 1843, beating murder of Amasa Sprague, a Cranston textile factory owner. Sprague was a member of a prominent Rhode Island family. His brother William was a United States senator. Six months before his murder, Amasa Sprague had used his family's political influence to have Cranston resident Nicholas Gordon's liquor license removed by the city council. Sprague's employees were habitually getting drunk at Gordon's premises. A gun used to shoot Sprague in the arm before he was beaten to death belonged to Nicholas Gordon. Tracks in the snow led from the place of the murder to the back door of Nicholas's house.

Nicholas Gordon and his brother John were Roman Catholic immigrants from Ireland. Nicholas, John and William Gordon (another brother) were all tried for murder, but only John was convicted, a conviction based on contradictory circumstantial evidence. William was found not guilty and in Nicholas's trial, held after John's execution, the jury was hung. John Gordon was executed by hanging in the state jail in Providence. The court justices, which included Justice Job Durfee, that were involved in all three trials acted as both trial judges and the court of final appeal. Included in jury instructions, Durfee "told the jurors to give greater weight to Yankee witnesses than Irish witnesses."

Sheriff Roger Williams Potter, who carried out the execution of Gordon, reported that Gordon admitted to being an accomplice to the murder of Amasa Sprague. However, Gordon also said "he had not shed any of Amasa Sprague's blood."

== Aftermath ==
Seven years after Gordon's execution, Rhode Island abolished the death penalty. Although it was reintroduced in 1872, no executions took place before capital punishment was abolished again by the state in 1984. In the 1990s, when the Rhode Island General Assembly considered reinstating the death penalty, Gordon's case was used by those against reinstatement to demonstrate the dangers of capital punishment.

In 2011, playwright Ken Dooley wrote and produced a stage play “The Murder Trial of John Gordon”. It ran 21 times at the Park Theater in Cranston, Rhode Island. Following his attending the play, State Representative Peter F. Martin from Newport introduced a resolution requesting that then Governor Lincoln Chafee grant a posthumous pardon to Gordon based on evidence that he, Gordon, had been subjected to a prejudiced trial.

Following passing of the resolution by the Rhode Island General Assembly, Governor Lincoln Chafee pardoned Gordon on June 29, 2011. The legislation was sponsored in the House of Representatives by Peter F. Martin and in the Senate by Michael McCaffrey. Chafee signed the proclamation of pardon at the Old State House, where Gordon's trial had taken place more than 150 years before.

In September 2014, Enda Kenny, the Taoiseach of Ireland, visited the Rhode Island Irish Famine Memorial and in a speech praised Martin and Chafee for pardoning Gordon.

== See also ==
- Capital punishment in Rhode Island
- List of most recent executions by jurisdiction
- List of people executed in Rhode Island
