= 1838 Rhode Island gubernatorial election =

- April 18, 1838
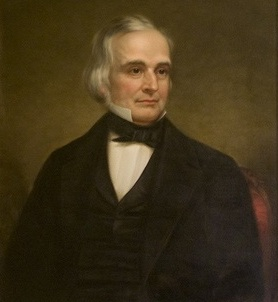

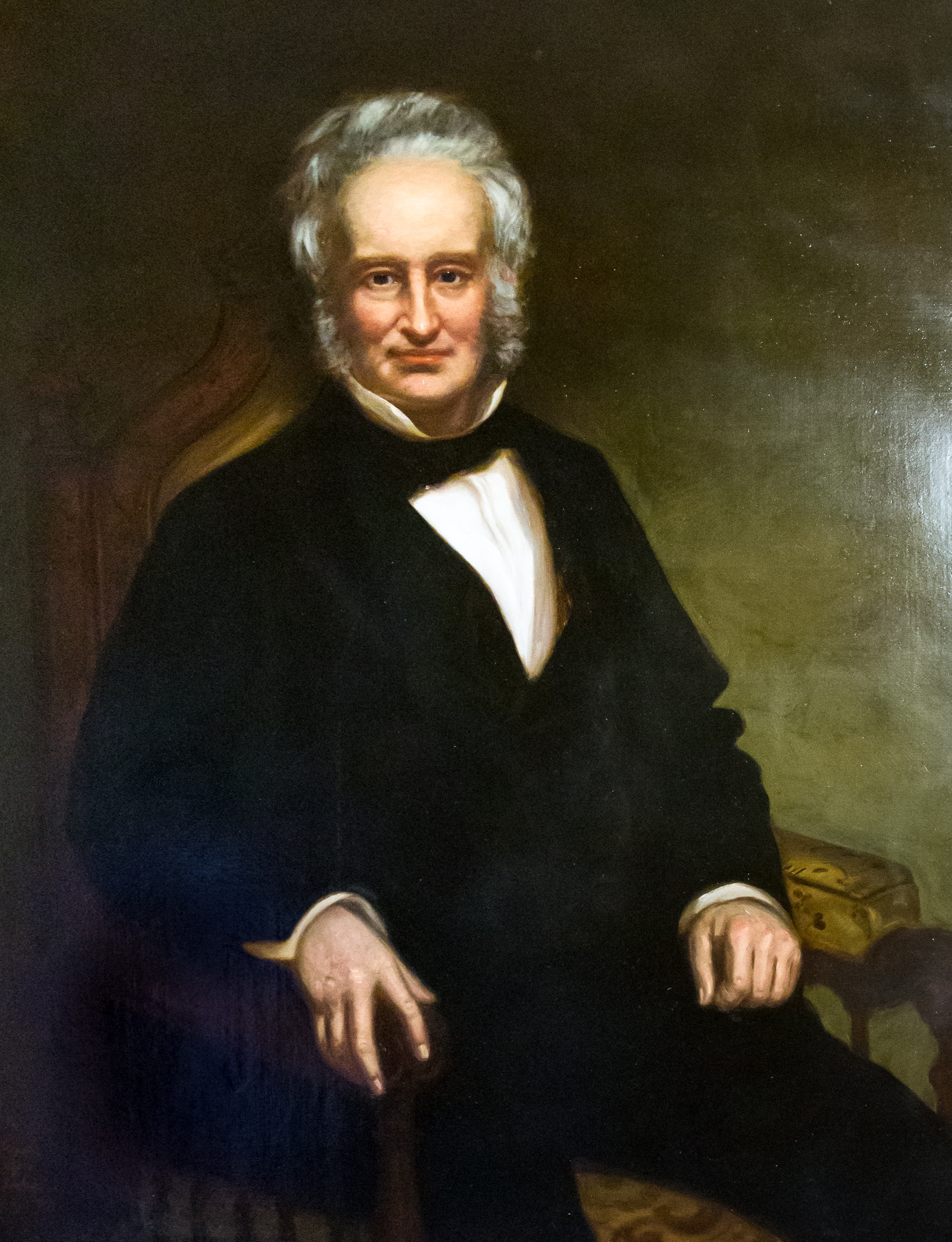
Nominee	William Sprague	John Brown Francis
Party	Whig	Democratic
Popular vote	3,984	3,504
Percentage	52.51%	46.18%
- County results Sprague: 50–60% 60–70% Francis: 50–60%
Governor before election
John Brown Francis
Democratic
Elected Governor
William Sprague
Whig

The 1838 Rhode Island gubernatorial election was held on April 18, 1838.

Incumbent Democratic governor John Brown Francis ran for election to a sixth term but was defeated by Whig nominee William Sprague.

== General election ==
=== Candidates ===
- John Brown Francis, Democratic, incumbent governor
- William Sprague, Whig, former U.S. representative

=== Results ===
1838 Rhode Island gubernatorial election
Party	Candidate	Votes	%	±%
Whig	William Sprague	3,984	52.51%	
Democratic	John Brown Francis (incumbent)	3,504	46.18%	
Scattering		99	1.30%	
Majority		480	6.33%	
Turnout		7,587		
Whig gain from Democratic		Swing		
