= 1837 New Jersey gubernatorial election =

- October 27, 1837
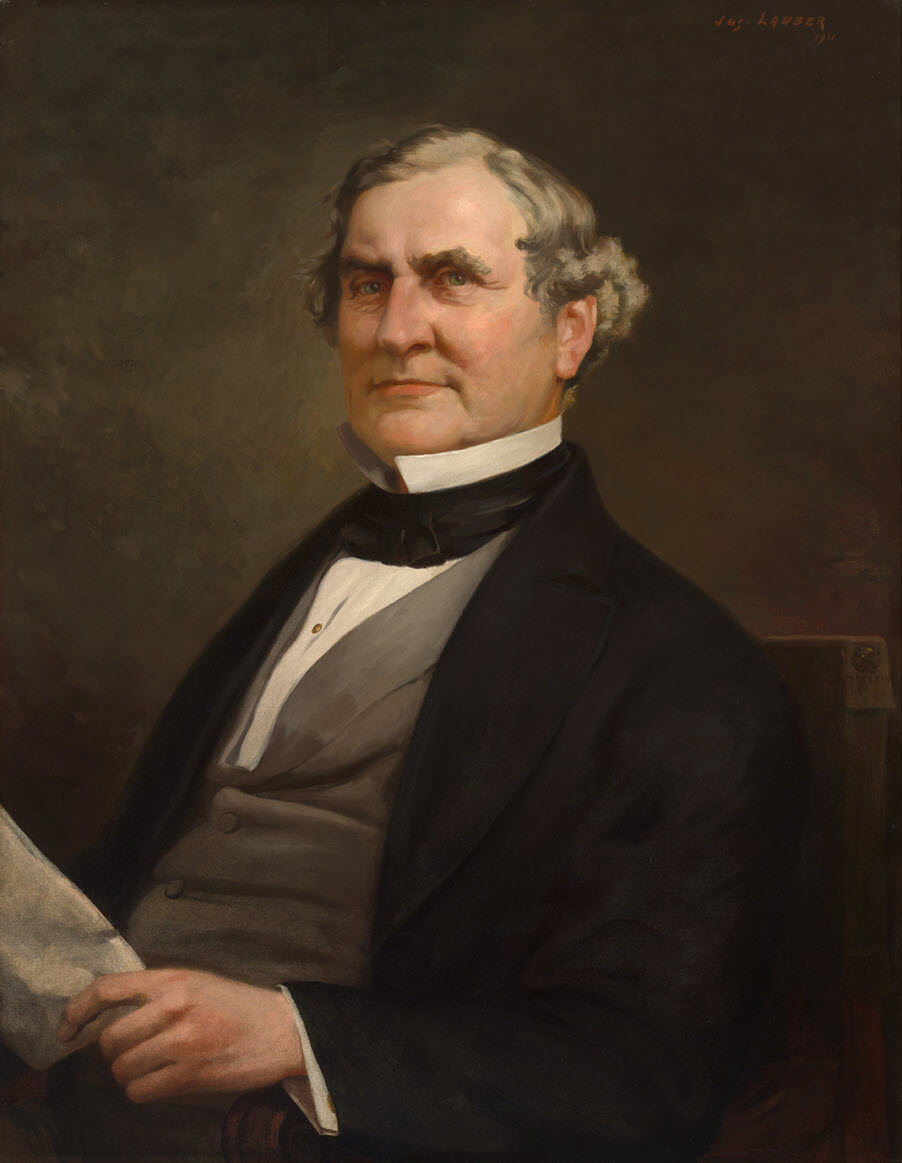

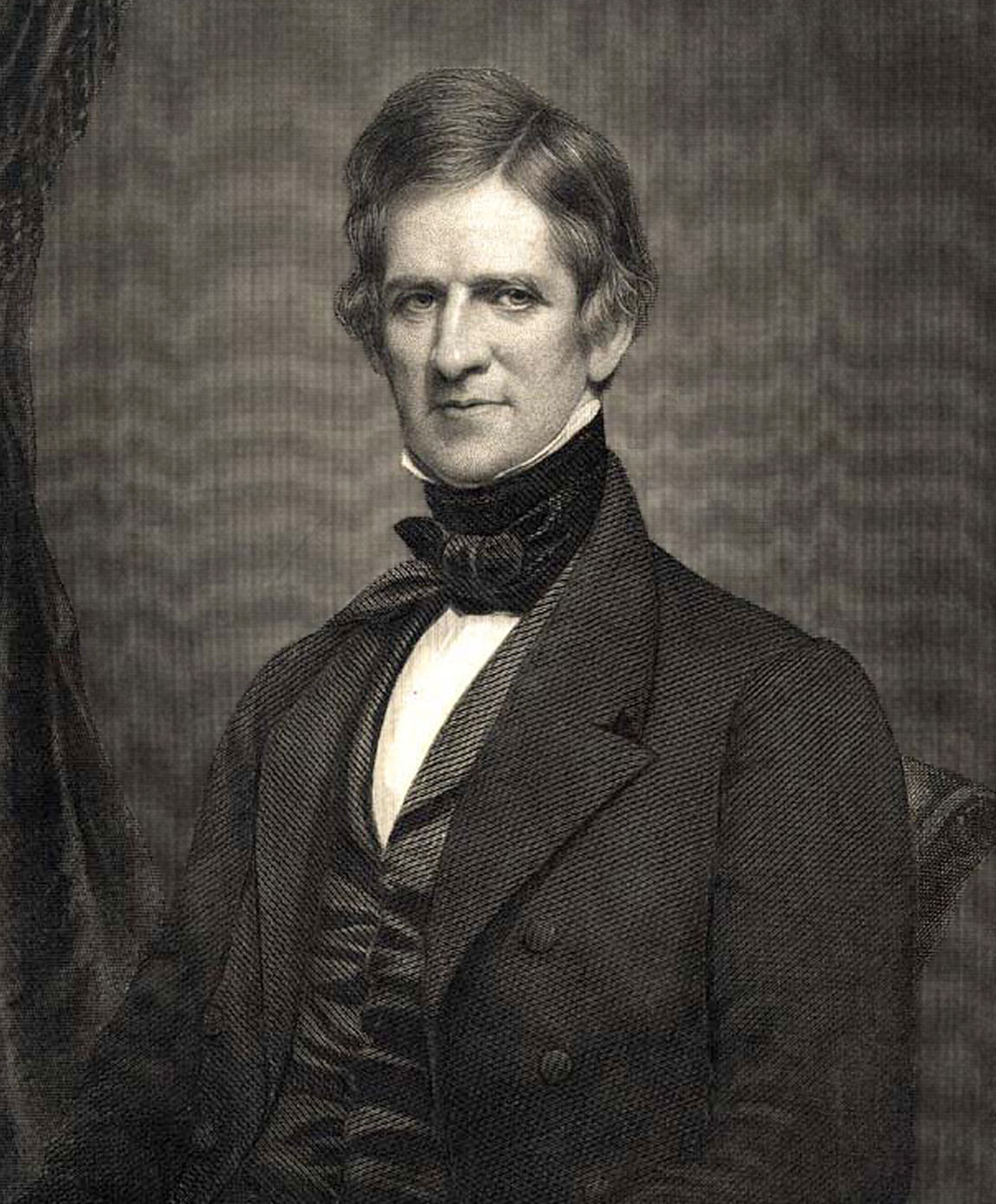
Nominee	William Pennington	Philemon Dickerson
Party	Whig	Democratic
Governor before election
Philemon Dickerson
Democratic
Elected Governor
William Pennington
Whig

The 1837 New Jersey gubernatorial election was held on October 27, 1837, in order to elect the governor of New Jersey. Whig nominee and former member of the New Jersey General Assembly William Pennington was elected by the New Jersey General Assembly against incumbent Democratic governor Philemon Dickerson.

== General election ==
On election day, October 27, 1837, Whig nominee William Pennington was elected by the New Jersey General Assembly against incumbent Democratic governor Philemon Dickerson, thereby gaining Whig control over the office of governor. Pennington was sworn in as the 13th governor of New Jersey that same day.

=== Results ===
New Jersey gubernatorial election, 1837
Party	Candidate	Votes	%
Whig	William Pennington	43	64.2
Democratic	Philemon Dickerson (incumbent)	24	35.8
Total votes		67	100.00%
Whig gain from Democratic			
