= 1837 Rhode Island gubernatorial election =

- April 19, 1837
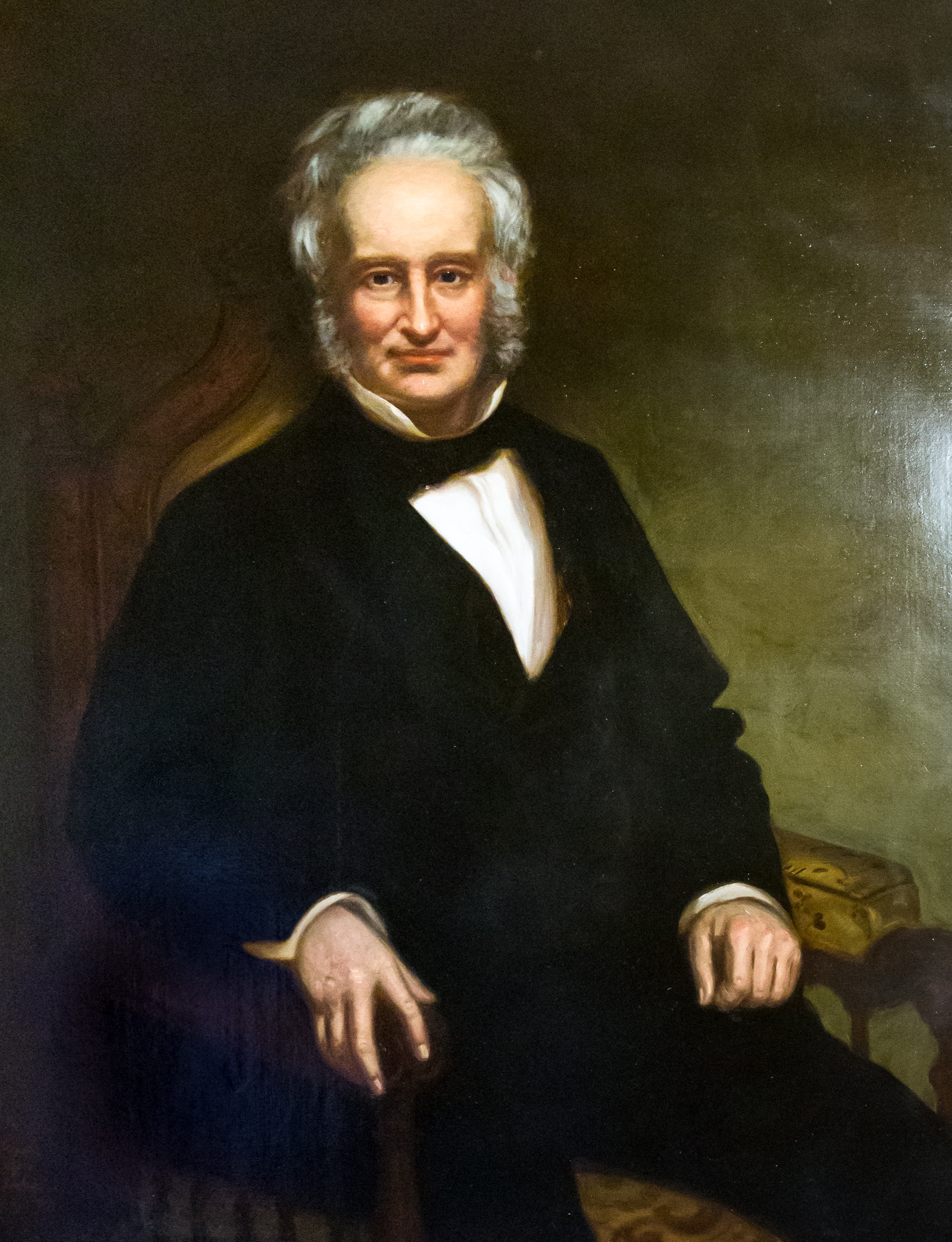

Nominee	John Brown Francis	William Peckham
Party	Democratic	Constitutional
Popular vote	2,716	946
Percentage	73.09%	25.46%
- County results Francis: 50–60% 60–70% 80–90%
Governor before election
John Brown Francis
Democratic
Elected Governor
John Brown Francis
Democratic

The 1837 Rhode Island gubernatorial election was held on April 19, 1837.

Incumbent Democratic governor John Brown Francis won re-election to a fifth term, defeating Constitutional Party candidate William Peckham.

== General election ==
=== Candidates ===
- John Brown Francis, Democratic, incumbent governor
- William Peckham, of South Kingstown, Constitutional, National Republican and Whig presidential elector in 1832 and 1836

=== Results ===
1837 Rhode Island gubernatorial election (Note: Some sources give Francis' vote as 2,762.)
Party	Candidate	Votes	%	±%
Democratic	John Brown Francis (incumbent)	2,716	73.09%	
Constitutional Party	William Peckham	946	25.46%	
Scattering		54	1.45%	
Majority		1,770	47.63%	
Turnout		3,716		
Democratic hold		Swing		
