= 1836 Rhode Island gubernatorial election =

- April 20, 1836
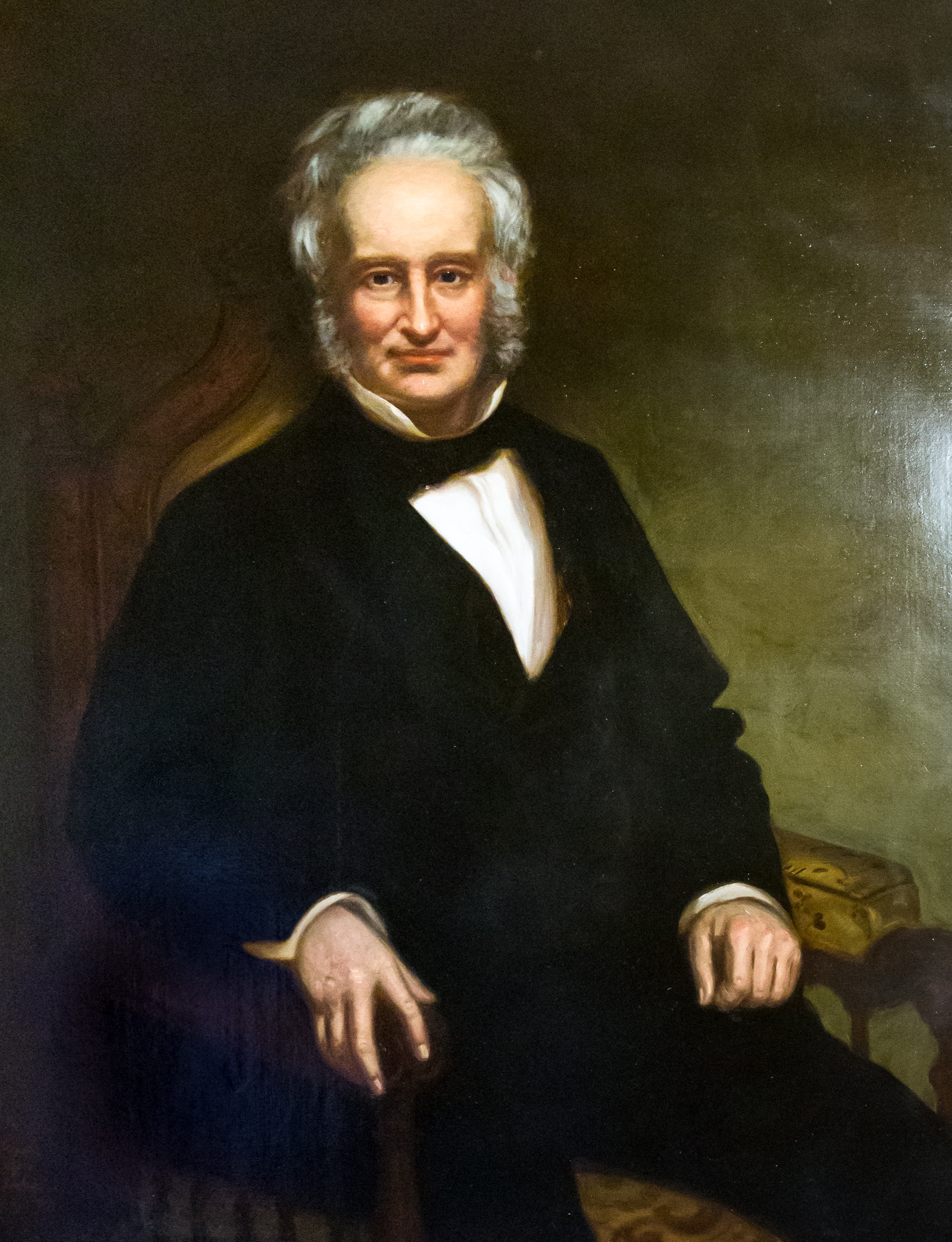

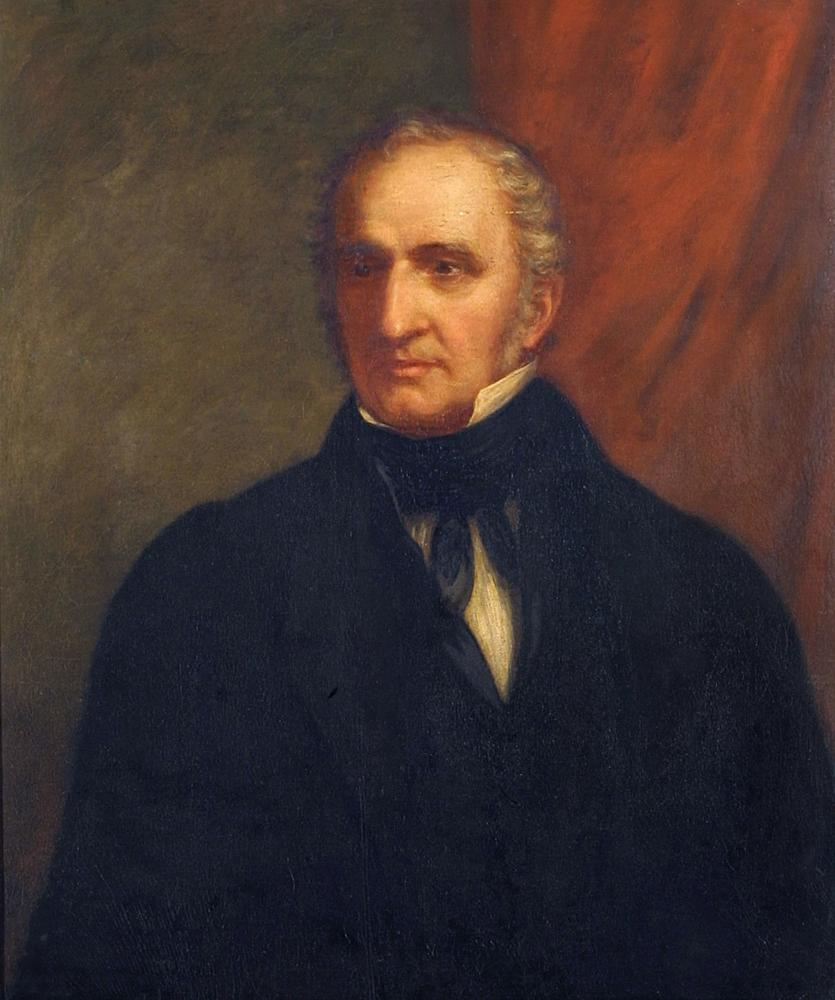
Nominee	John Brown Francis	Tristam Burges
Party	Democratic	Whig
Popular vote	4,020	2,984
Percentage	56.22%	41.73%
- County results Francis: 50–60% 60–70%
Governor before election
John Brown Francis
Democratic
Elected Governor
John Brown Francis
Democratic

The 1836 Rhode Island gubernatorial election was held on April 20, 1836.

Incumbent Democratic governor John Brown Francis won re-election to a fourth term, defeating Whig nominee Tristam Burges and Constitutional Party candidate Charles Collins.

== General election ==
=== Candidates ===
- John Brown Francis, Democratic, incumbent governor
- Tristam Burges, Whig, former U.S. representative
- Charles Collins, of Middletown, Constitutional

=== Results ===
1836 Rhode Island gubernatorial election
Party	Candidate	Votes	%	±%
Democratic	John Brown Francis (incumbent)	4,020	56.22%	
Whig	Tristam Burges	2,984	41.73%	
Constitutional Party	Charles Collins	135	1.89%	
Scattering		12	0.17%	
Majority		1,036	14.49%	
Turnout		7,151		
Democratic hold		Swing		
