= Tristam Burges =

American judge

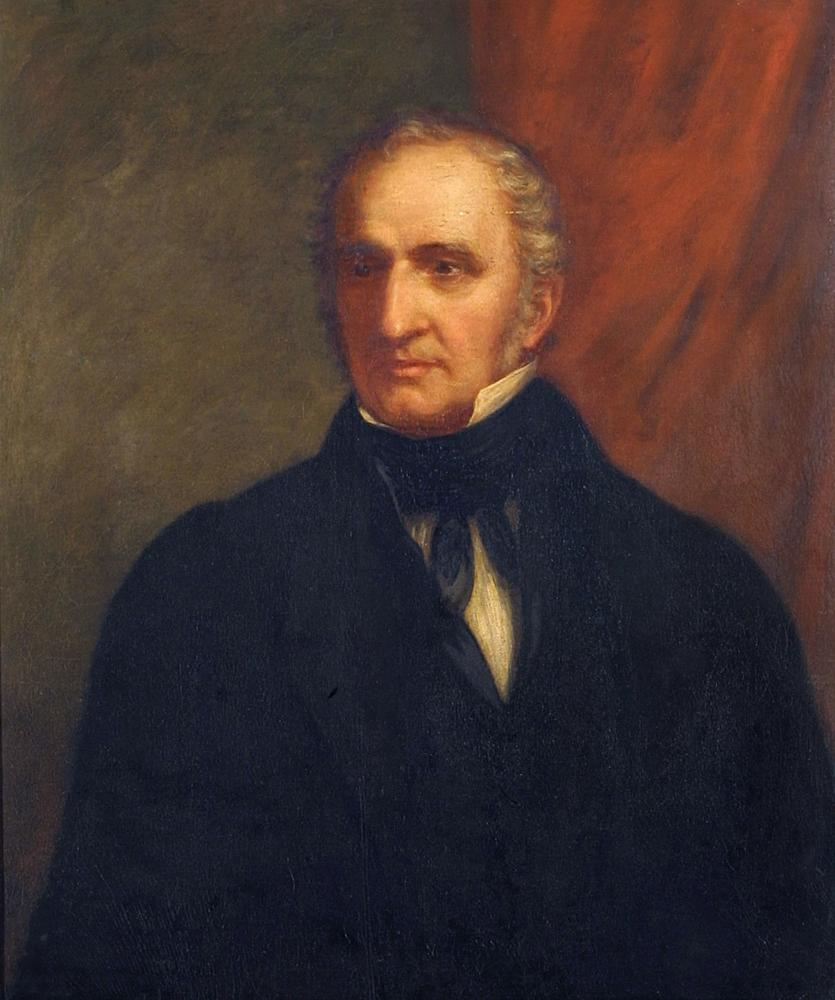
- Tristam Burges painted by Charles Bird King

Member of the U.S. House of Representatives from Rhode Island's at-large district
- In office March 4, 1825 – March 3, 1835
- Preceded by: Samuel Eddy
- Succeeded by: William Sprague III

Member of the Rhode Island General Assembly
- In office 1811

Personal details
- Born: February 26, 1770 Rochester, Province of Massachusetts Bay, British America
- Died: October 13, 1853 (aged 83) Seekonk, Massachusetts, U.S. (now East Providence, Rhode Island)
- Resting place: North Burial Ground
- Party: Federalist Party; Whig
- Education: Brown University
- Occupation: Lawyer

Tristam Burges (February 26, 1770 – October 13, 1853) was a U.S. representative from Rhode Island, and great-great-uncle of Rhode Island politician Theodore Francis Green.

== Early life and law career ==
Burges was born in Rochester in the Province of Massachusetts Bay on February 26, 1770, to John and Abigail Burges. Burges's father was a cooper and farmer, and a Revolutionary War veteran.

Burges attended the common schools. He studied medicine at a school in Wrentham. Upon the death of his father he abandoned the study of medicine. He was graduated from Rhode Island College (now Brown University), Providence, Rhode Island, valedictorian of the class of 1796. He studied law, and was admitted to the bar in 1799 and commenced practice in Providence, Rhode Island.

He married in 1801 to a daughter of Hon. Welcome Arnold, and had several children.

== Political career ==
He served as member of the Rhode Island General Assembly in 1811 and a prominent member of the Federalist Party. He was appointed chief justice of the Supreme Court of Rhode Island in May 1815, serving for just one year.

In 1815 Burges was named as professor of oratory and belles letters at Brown University; he taught lectures in rhetoric and oratory. He was dismissed from this position in 1830.

Burges was elected to the US Congress in 1825 as a Federalist and served for ten years. He was known for his witty repartee with the anti-New England Virginian John Randolph of Roanoke. He favored a protective trade tariff, and he lost a re-election race because he refused to accept a tariff compromise proposed by Henry Clay.

Burges was elected as an Adams candidate to the Nineteenth and Twentieth Congresses and elected as an Anti-Jacksonian to the Twenty-first through the Twenty-third Congresses (March 4, 1825 – March 3, 1835). He served as chairman of the Committee on Revolutionary Pensions (Nineteenth Congress), Committee on Military Pensions (Nineteenth and Twentieth Congresses), Committee on Revolutionary Claims (Twenty-first Congress), Committee on Invalid Pensions (Twenty-second and Twenty-third Congresses). He was an unsuccessful candidate for reelection.

After an unsuccessful run for Rhode Island Governor as a Whig party candidate in 1836, he resumed the practice of law in East Providence, Rhode Island.

His desk and bookcase currently resides in the Stanley Weiss Collection. It was made in Providence, Rhode Island in the early 1800s. The maker is uncertain, but it was possibly made by James Halyburton.

He died on his estate, Watchemoket Farm in 1853 in the town of Seekonk, Massachusetts (in the portion of which that would later be given from Massachusetts to Rhode Island and be incorporated as East Providence, Rhode Island, from a Supreme Court order settling a boundary dispute between the two states). He was interred in North Burial Ground, Providence, Rhode Island.

== Sources ==
- United States Congress. "Tristam Burges (id: B001082)". Biographical Directory of the United States Congress.

Party political offices
Preceded by Nehemiah R. Knight	Whig nominee for Governor of Rhode Island; 1836	Vacant Title next held by William Sprague III
U.S. House of Representatives
Preceded by Samuel Eddy	Member of the U.S. House of Representatives from Rhode Island's at-large congressional district March 4, 1825 – March 3, 1835	Succeeded by William Sprague III
