= 1837 Virginia gubernatorial election =

- January 20, 1837
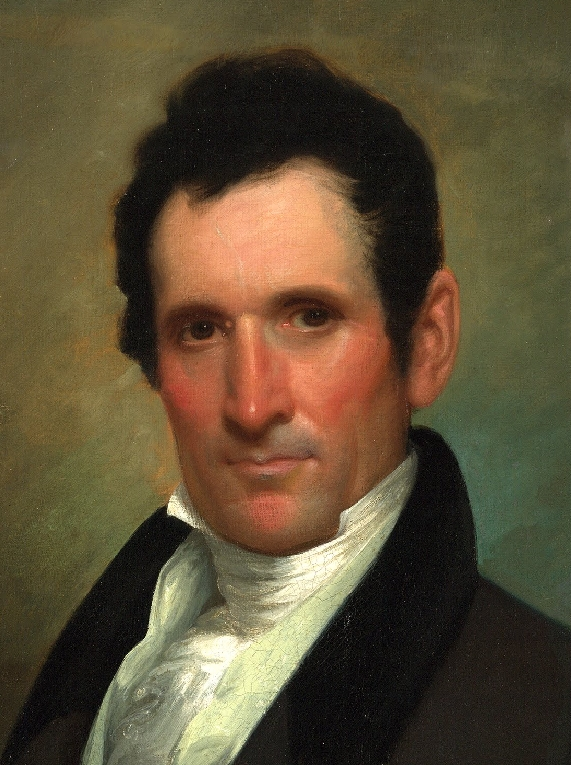

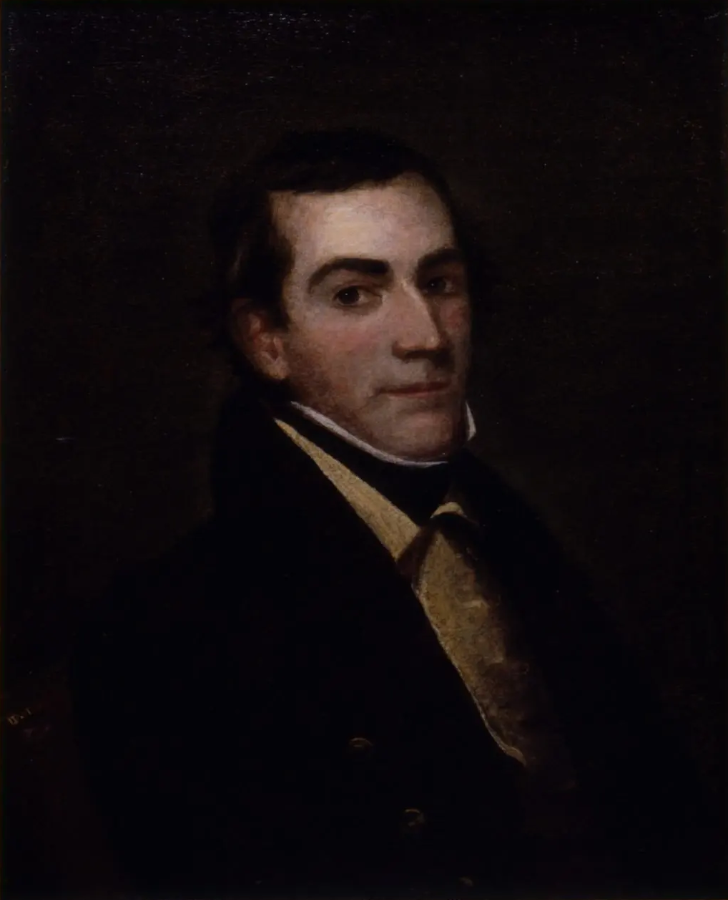

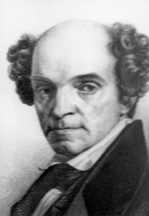
| Nominee | David Campbell | William Daniel | William H. Roane |
| Party | Democratic | Democratic | Democratic |
| 1st ballot | 88 | 33 | 21 |
Governor before election
Wyndham Robertson
Whig
Elected Governor
David Campbell
Democratic

A gubernatorial election was held in Virginia on January 20, 1837. The Democratic former member of the Virginia Senate from Washington County David Campbell defeated the Democratic member of the Virginia House of Delegates William Daniel and the Democratic member of the Executive Council William H. Roane.

The previous governor of Virginia Littleton Waller Tazewell resigned on March 30, 1836. Wyndham Robertson succeeded to office in his capacity as the senior member of the Executive Council and acted as governor for the remainder of Tazewell's unexpired term.

The Democratic members of the legislature held a caucus in advance of the election. Several prospective candidates were considered for the nomination, including the member of the House of Delegates from Albemarle County Thomas Jefferson Randolph, the Democratic floor leader Joseph Watkins, and the speaker of the Virginia House of Delegates Linn Banks. Campbell lacked the statewide reputation of the other candidates, but emerged as a compromise choice in the crowded field. Campbell, Roane, and Daniel were nominated on the day of the caucus. Daniel declined consideration, after which Campbell was nominated on the third ballot.

The election was conducted by the Virginia General Assembly in joint session. Campbell was elected with a majority on the first ballot.

== General election ==
1837 Virginia gubernatorial election
| Party | Candidate | First ballot | |
| Party | Candidate | Count | Percent |
|---|---|---|---|
| Democratic | David Campbell | 88 | 57.14 |
| Democratic | William Daniel | 33 | 21.43 |
| Democratic | William H. Roane | 21 | 13.64 |
| Democratic | James B. Mallory | 4 | 2.60 |
| Whig | Wyndham Robertson (incumbent) | 3 | 1.95 |
| Whig | Benjamin Watkins Leigh | 2 | 1.30 |
| Whig | Joseph Carrington Cabell | 1 | 0.65 |
| Whig | William F. Gordon | 1 | 0.65 |
| Whig | John Tyler | 1 | 0.65 |
| Total | | 154 | 100.00 |

== Bibliography ==
- Dent, Lynwood Miller (1974). The Virginia Democratic Party, 1824-1847. (Volumes I and II) (PhD thesis). [Baton Rouge]: Louisiana State University.
- Sobel, Robert; Raimo, John (1978). Biographical Directory of the Governors of the United States 1789–1978. Vol. 4. Westport, CT: Meckler Books.
- Virginia (1836). Journal of the House of Delegates [...]. Richmond.
