= John Brown Francis =

American politician

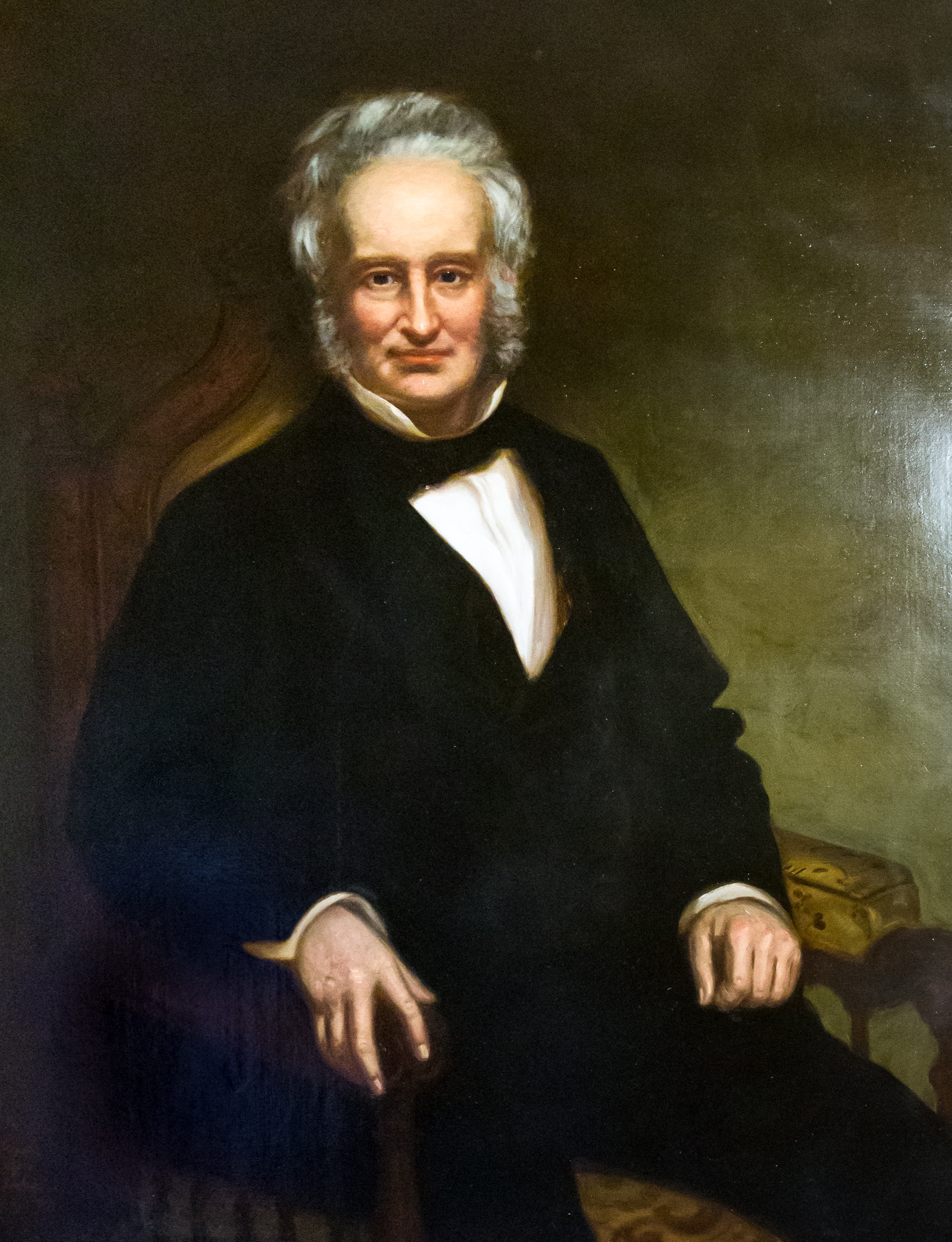
- In office January 25, 1844 – March 3, 1845
- Preceded by: William Sprague III
- Succeeded by: Albert C. Greene

13th Governor of Rhode Island
- In office May 1, 1833 – May 2, 1838
- Lieutenant: Jeffrey Hazard; George Engs; Jeffrey Hazard; Benjamin B. Thurston
- Preceded by: Lemuel H. Arnold
- Succeeded by: William Sprague III

Member of the Rhode Island Senate
- In office 1831; 1842; 1845–1856

Member of the Rhode Island House of Representatives
- In office 1821–1829

5th Chancellor of Brown University
- In office 1841–1854
- Preceded by: Samuel Willard Bridgham
- Succeeded by: Samuel Boyd Tobey

Personal details
- Born: May 31, 1791 Philadelphia, Pennsylvania, U.S.
- Died: August 9, 1864 (aged 73) Warwick, Rhode Island, U.S.
- Resting place: North Burial Ground, Providence, Rhode Island, U.S.
- Party: Whig; Law and Order
- Spouse(s): Anne Carter Brown; Elizabeth Francis Harrison
- Education: Brown University
- Profession: Politician, Manufacturer

John Brown Francis (May 31, 1791 – August 9, 1864) was a governor and United States senator from Rhode Island.

== Early life ==
John Brown Francis was born in Philadelphia, Pennsylvania, on May 31, 1791, son of John Francis and Abigail Brown. Francis' grandfather, John Brown, was a U.S. Representative from Rhode Island and a member of the family for whom Brown University was named.

He attended the common schools of Providence, Rhode Island, and graduated from Brown University in 1808.

== Career ==
He engaged in mercantile pursuits, attended the Litchfield Law School, and was admitted to the bar but never practiced. Francis was a member of the Rhode Island House of Representatives from 1821 to 1829 and a member of the board of trustees of Brown University from 1828 to 1857. He was a member of the Rhode Island Senate in 1831 and 1842, and was the 13th Governor of Rhode Island from 1833 to 1838.

From 1841 to 1854, Francis was chancellor of Brown University; he was elected as a member of the Law and Order Party to the U.S. Senate to fill the vacancy caused by the resignation of William Sprague and served from January 25, 1844, to March 3, 1845. He was not a candidate for reelection; while in the Senate, he was chairman of the Committee on Engrossed Bills (Twenty-eighth Congress).

Francis was a member of the Rhode Island Senate from 1845 to 1856, and then retired from public life and engaged in agricultural pursuits until his death at "Spring Green," Warwick, Rhode Island, in 1864; interment was in North Burial Ground, Providence.

== Personal life ==
In 1822, he married Anne Carter Brown, daughter of Nicholas Brown Jr. and granddaughter of Nicholas Brown Sr. Before her death in 1828, they had:

- Abby Francis (1823–1841), who died unmarried
- John Francis (1826–1827), who died an infant
- Anne Brown Francis (1828–1896), who married Marshall Woods (1824–1899), son of Alva Woods and Almira Marshall, in 1848.

In 1832 he married his cousin, Elizabeth Francis, widow of Henry Harrison and daughter of Thomas Willing Francis and Dorothy Willing. Together, they had:

- Elizabeth Francis (1833–1901), who did not have children
- Sally Francis (1834–1904), who did not have children
- Sophia H. Francis (1836–1860), who married George William Adams (1834–1883), son of Seth Adams and Sarah Bigelow, in 1860, who did not have children
- John Brown Francis (1838–1870), who did not have children

On August 9, 1864, John Brown Francis, aged 73, died in Warwick, Rhode Island.

Party political offices
Preceded by James Fenner	Democratic nominee for Governor of Rhode Island; 1833, 1834, 1835, 1836, 1837, 1838	Succeeded by Nathaniel Bullock
Political offices
Preceded by Lemuel H. Arnold	Governor of Rhode Island; 1833–1838	Succeeded by William Sprague III
U.S. Senate
Preceded by William Sprague III	U.S. senator (Class 1) from Rhode Island; January 25, 1844 – March 3, 1845; Served alongside: James F. Simmons	Succeeded by Albert C. Greene
