= William Sprague III =

American politician

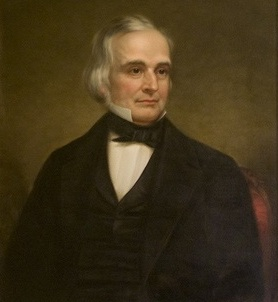

United States Senator from Rhode Island
- In office February 18, 1842 – January 17, 1844
- Preceded by: Nathan F. Dixon
- Succeeded by: John B. Francis

14th Governor of Rhode Island
- In office May 2, 1838 – May 2, 1839
- Lieutenant: Joseph Childs
- Preceded by: John B. Francis
- Succeeded by: Samuel Ward King

Member of the U.S. House of Representatives from Rhode Island's at-large district
- In office March 4, 1835 – March 3, 1837
- Preceded by: Tristam Burges
- Succeeded by: Robert B. Cranston

Speaker of the Rhode Island House of Representatives
- In office 1832–1835
- Preceded by: Joseph L. Tillinghast
- Succeeded by: Henry Y. Cranston

Personal details
- Born: November 3, 1799 Cranston, Rhode Island, U.S.
- Died: October 19, 1856 (aged 56) Providence, Rhode Island, U.S.
- Party: Whig

William Sprague, also known as William III or William Sprague III (November 3, 1799 – October 19, 1856), was a politician and industrialist from the U.S. state of Rhode Island, serving as the 14th governor, a U.S. representative and a U.S. senator. He was the uncle of William Sprague IV, also a governor and senator from Rhode Island.

== Biography ==
William Sprague was the son of William Sprague (1773–1836) and Anna Potter (1763–1828). He was born in the Gov. William Sprague Mansion in Cranston, Rhode Island, and pursued classical studies as a student. He engaged in mercantile pursuits and was a member of the Rhode Island House of Representatives, serving as speaker from 1832 to 1835 and leading a coalition of Anti-Masonic and Democratic Party members.

He was elected as an at-large candidate from the Whig Party to the Twenty-fourth Congress and served from March 4, 1835, to March 3, 1837. He declined to be a candidate for renomination in 1836. He was elected Governor of Rhode Island in 1838. He subsequently was elected as a Whig to the United States Senate to fill the vacancy caused by the death of Nathan F. Dixon and served from February 18, 1842, to January 17, 1844, when he resigned. He served as chairman of the United States Senate Committee on Enrolled Bills in the Twenty-seventh Congress. He was a U.S. presidential elector on the Whig ticket in 1848.

His family fortune came from the cotton and paint manufacturing, and he assumed active control of the family business following the murder of his brother Amasa on December 31, 1843. The Senator took an active interest in the trial of the Gordon brothers for the murder. The trial resulted in one of the defendants being sent to the gallows, and remains highly controversial for the amount of anti-Irish bigotry involved. In 2011, the condemned man was posthumously pardoned by the Rhode Island governor.

In addition to the family business, he was president of the Hartford, Providence, and Fishkill Railroad, and of two banks. The extended Sprague family has descendants who live in the Utica, New York area. Sprague died in Providence, Rhode Island, and is interred in Swan Point Cemetery there.

Party political offices
| First | Anti-Masonic nominee for Governor of Rhode Island; 1831, 1832 | Succeeded by None |
| Vacant Title last held by Tristam Burges | Whig nominee for Governor of Rhode Island; 1838, 1839 | Succeeded by Samuel Ward King |
U.S. House of Representatives
| Preceded by Dutee Jerauld Pearce | Member of the U.S. House of Representatives from Rhode Island's at-large congressional district March 4, 1835 – March 3, 1837 | Succeeded by Robert B. Cranston |
Political offices
| Preceded by John Brown Francis | Governor of Rhode Island; May 2, 1838 – May 2, 1839 | Succeeded by Samuel Ward King |
U.S. Senate
| Preceded by Nathan F. Dixon | U.S. senator (Class 1) from Rhode Island; February 18, 1842 – January 17, 1844; Served alongside: James F. Simmons | Succeeded by John B. Francis |
