= Amasa Sprague =

American businessman, politician, and murder victim (1798–1843)

- Born: April 10, 1798; Cranston, Rhode Island
- Died: December 31, 1843 (aged 45)
- Cause of death: Shot & Beaten
- Occupations: Politician,Businessman
- Notable work: American businessman and politician

Amasa Sprague (April 10, 1798 – December 31, 1843) was an American businessman and politician from Rhode Island. He co-founded the A & W Sprague textile firm with his brother William Sprague III. He was murdered on New Year's Eve, 1843.

== Business career ==
Sprague was born on April 10, 1798, in Cranston, Rhode Island. He began his career working at his father William Sprague II's cotton mill. As the elder Sprague's business expanded, Amasa assisted his father in purchasing raw materials and selling the finished product. William Sprague II died on March 28, 1836, and after their father's will was settled, Sprague and his brother William Sprague III founded A & W Sprague to continue the cotton and calico business. Amasa Sprague was the senior partner and superintendent of the print works.

Sprague represented Cranston in the Rhode Island House of Representatives in 1832, 1840, and 1841.

== Personal life ==
Sprague and his wife, Fanny Morgan had four children

- Mary Anna Sprague, wife of John E. Nichols (first) and Frank W. Latham (second)
- Almyra Sprague, wife of Providence, Rhode Island, mayor Thomas A. Doyle
- Amasa Sprague Jr., founder of Narragansett Park
- William Sprague IV, Governor of Rhode Island and United States Senator

== Murder ==
On December 31, 1843, Sprague was shot in the arm and beaten to death by at least two men. The motive was not robbery, as $60 and a gold watch was found on Sprague's body. Nicholas Gordon, a tavern owner whose liquor license had been revoked by the Cranston city council at Sprague's insistence, and his brothers William and John Gordon were tried for the murder. William was found not guilty and Nicholas' two trials ended in a hung jury, but John Gordon was found guilty and executed on February 14, 1845. Gordon's conviction was described by researchers, who found a collection of papers belonging to the judge who presided over the trial, as anti-Irish Catholic and anti-immigrant bias. In 2011, he was granted a posthumous pardon by the governor.
