= George Curtis =

George Curtis may refer to:

== Sports ==
- George Curtis (cricketer) (1837–1885), Australian cricketer
- George Curtis (greyhound trainer) (1923–2020), British greyhound trainer
- George Curtis (footballer, born 1919) (1919–2004), footballer with Arsenal F.C. and Southampton F.C., and Norway national football team manager
- George Curtis (footballer, born 1939) (1939–2021), footballer and manager, most notably with Coventry City F.C.

== Politics ==
- George M. Curtis (Iowa politician) (1844–1921), U.S. Representative from Iowa
- George M. Curtis (New York politician), member of the New York State Assembly
- George Curtis (Australian politician) (1845–1922), Australian politician
- George Curtis (Union spy) during the American Civil War

== Others ==
- George Curtis (banker) (1796–1856), American banker and politician
- George F. Curtis (1906–2005), founding dean of the University of British Columbia Faculty of Law
- George William Curtis (1824–1892), American writer and public speaker
- George Ticknor Curtis (1812–1894), American author, historian and lawyer

== See also ==
- George Curtis Moore (1925–1973), American diplomat
- George Washington Parke Custis (1781–1857), American antiquarian and author
