= Samuel W. Bridgham =

Rhode Island politician

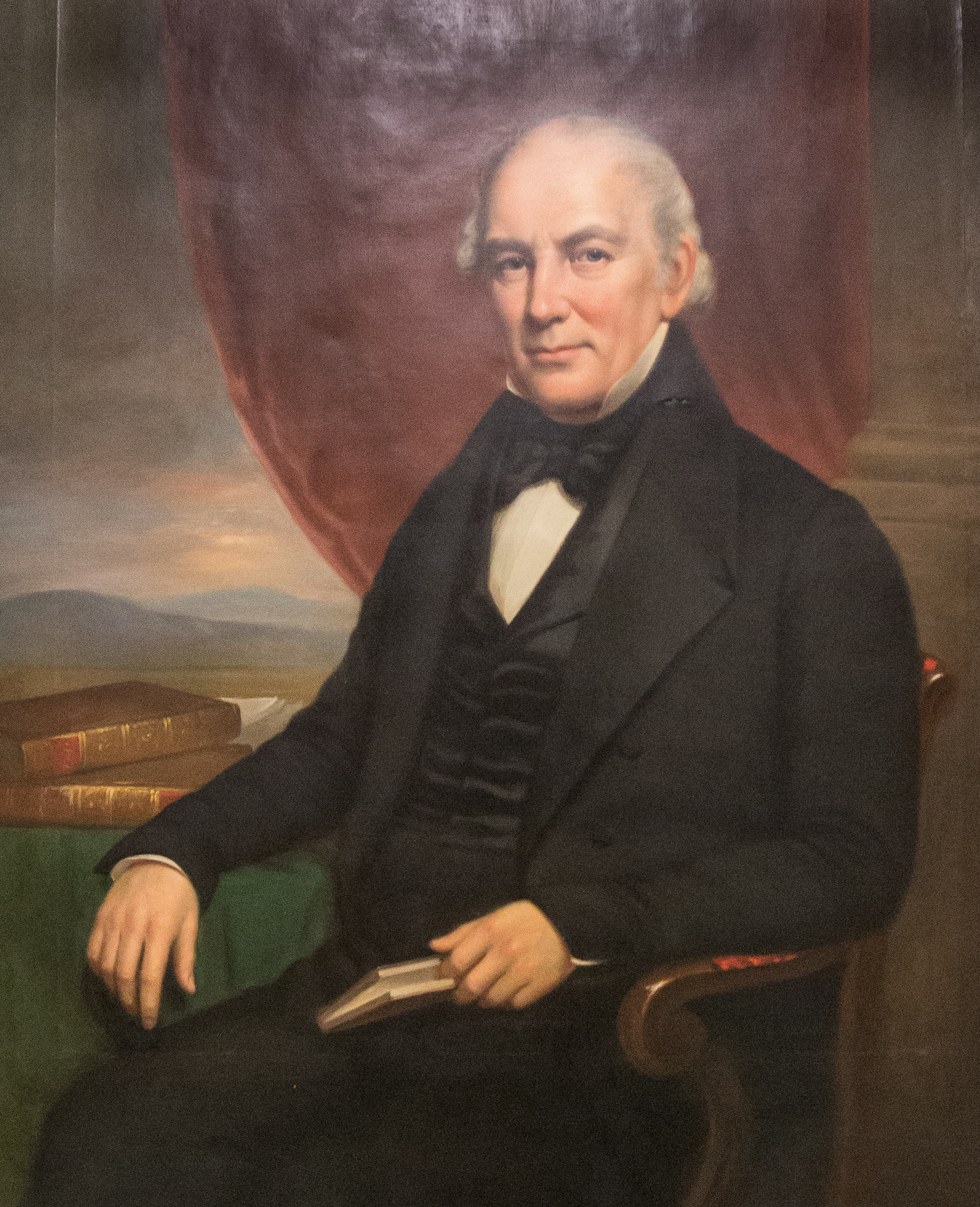
- Official portrait in Providence City Hall

1st Mayor of Providence, Rhode Island
- In office June 1832 – December 1840
- Preceded by: Office created
- Succeeded by: Thomas M. Burgess

Attorney General of Rhode Island
- In office 1814–1817
- Governor: William Jones
- Preceded by: James Burrill Jr.
- Succeeded by: Henry Bowen

4th Chancellor of Brown University
- In office 1828–1840
- Preceded by: Alexander Viets Griswold
- Succeeded by: John Brown Francis

Personal details
- Born: Samuel Willard Bridgham; May 4, 1774 Seekonk, Province of Massachusetts Bay
- Died: December 28, 1840 (aged 66) Providence, Rhode Island, U.S.
- Resting place: North Burial Ground
- Party: Whig
- Spouse: Elizabeth Paine Bridgham (after 1798)
- Children: 6
- Education: Brown University

Samuel Willard Bridgham (May 4, 1774 – December 28, 1840) was the first mayor of Providence, Rhode Island.

== Early life ==
Bridgham was born on May 4, 1774, in Seekonk, Massachusetts. He graduated from Brown University with the class of 1794, at the age of twenty.

== Career ==
Bridgham became a lawyer before entering politics. He served nineteen terms in the Rhode Island General Assembly, two of those as the Speaker. He also served as Attorney General of Rhode Island for four years. Bridgham stood as the Federalist candidate in the 1821 Rhode Island gubernatorial election, but lost to William C. Gibbs. When Providence was incorporated as a city in 1832, he was elected its first Mayor. He served in that office until his death in 1840, at the age of 66. Bridgham became the first mayor of Providence at a time when disorder and vice threatened the city. His solutions were free public education, temperance, and relief for the poor. He laid down foundations for good municipal government in Providence and served during one of the city's most significant expansions of the public school system.

Outside politics in 1821 he was elected Trustee of Brown University. He served as Brown's Chancellor from 1828 to 1840. For nineteen years he was the President of the Benevolent Congregational Society in Providence. Bridgham was elected a member of the American Antiquarian Society in 1813.

== Personal life ==
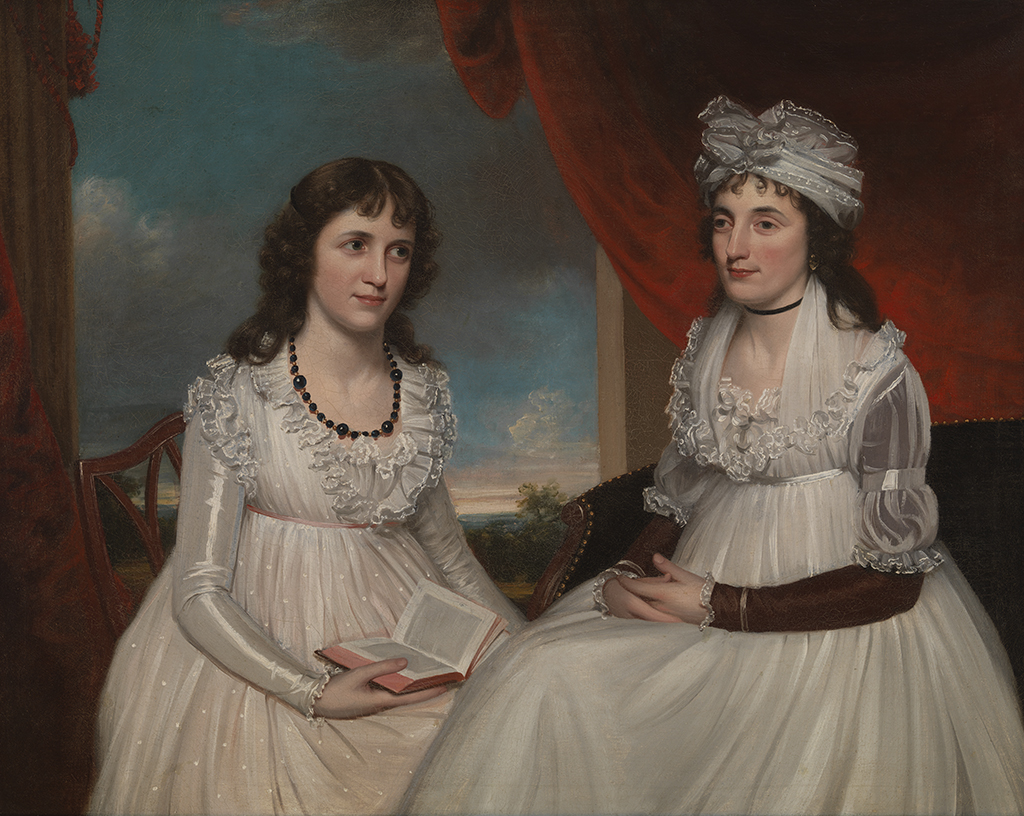
Portrait of Elizabeth Paine and her Aunt Sarah, by James Earl, between c. 1794 and c. 1796

In 1798, he married Elizabeth Paine (1776–1853), a daughter of Stephen and Elizabeth Paine of Bristol, Rhode Island. Together, they were the parents of six children:

- Elizabeth W. Bridgham (1799–1882), who married William Samuel Patten (1800–1873) in 1827.
- Abby C. Bridgham (1803–1840), who married Edward Little of New York in 1831.
- Samuel Fales Bridgham (1805–1807), who died young.
- Julia Bowen Bridgham (1810–1874), who married George Curtis, president of Continental National Bank of New York.
- Samuel Willard Bridgham (1813–1870), who married his second cousin Eliza Ann Fales (1813–1895) in 1839.
- Joseph Bridgham (1815–1865), a lawyer and United States Commissioner in New York City.

Bridgham died on December 28, 1840, in Providence and was buried in the North Burial Ground.

=== Descendants ===
In 1869, Bridgham's grandson Samuel Willard Bridgham (1842–1915), married Fanny Schermerhorn (1846–1919), a niece of Caroline Schermerhorn Astor, who was known as the "Mrs. Astor" and was the leader of New York society during the Gilded Age.

Party political offices
| Vacant Title last held by Elisha Reynolds Potter | Federalist nominee for Governor of Rhode Island; 1821 | Succeeded by None |
Political offices
| Preceded by First | Mayor of Providence; 1832–1840 | Succeeded by Thomas M. Burgess |
Legal offices
| Preceded by James Burrill Jr. | Attorney General of Rhode Island; 1814–1817 | Succeeded by Henry Bowen |
