= 1821 Rhode Island gubernatorial election =

- April 18, 1821
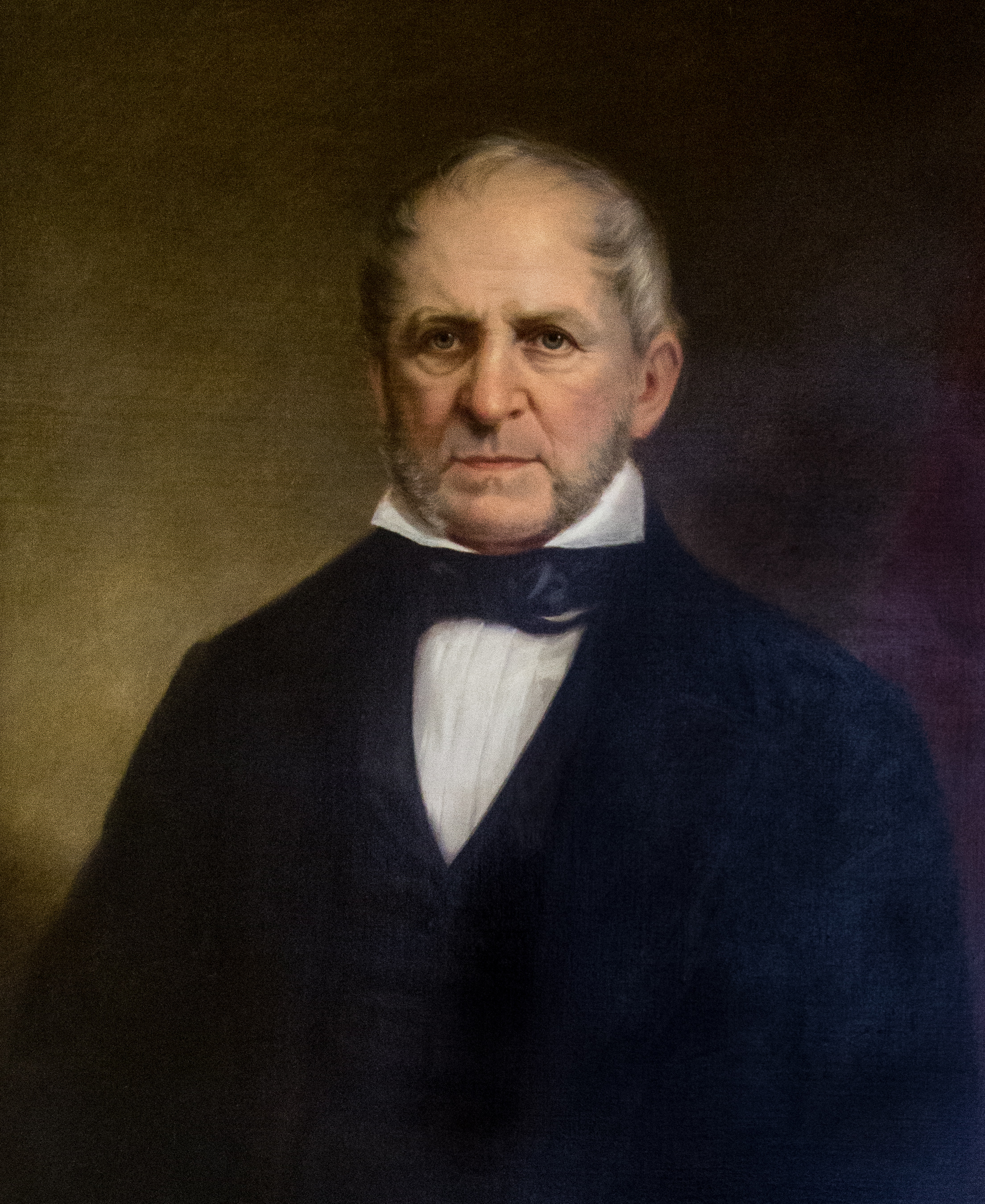

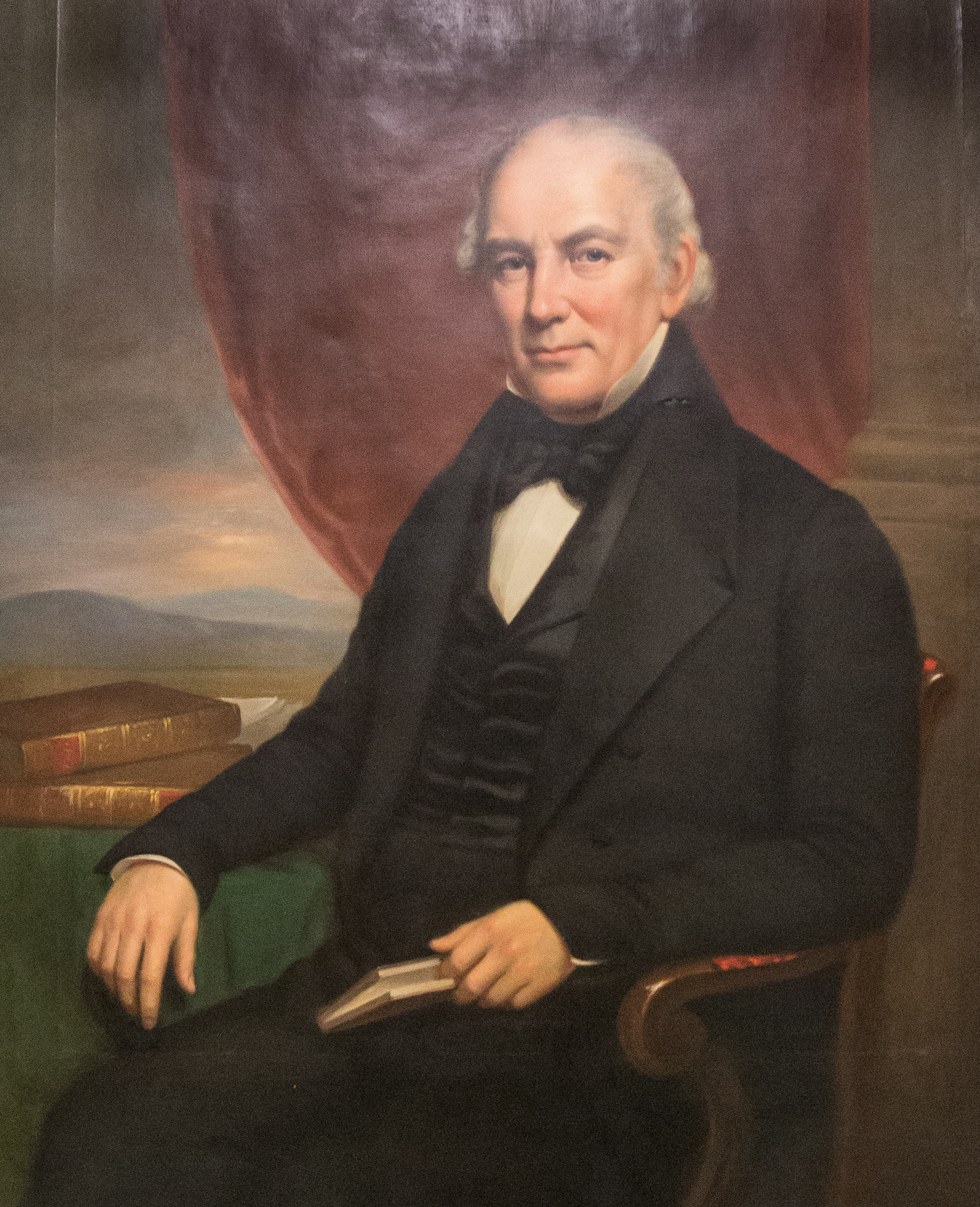
Nominee	William C. Gibbs	Samuel W. Bridgham
Party	Democratic-Republican	Federalist
Popular vote	3,790	2,801
Percentage	56.97%	42.10%
- Gibbs: 50–60% 60–70% 80–90% 90–100% Bridgham: 50–60% 60–70% 70–80% Tie: 50%
Governor before election
Nehemiah Rice Knight
Democratic-Republican
Elected Governor
William C. Gibbs
Democratic-Republican

The 1821 Rhode Island gubernatorial election was an election held on April 18, 1821, to elect the governor of Rhode Island. William C. Gibbs, the Democratic-Republican nominee, beat Samuel W. Bridgham, the Federalist candidate, with 56.97% of the vote.

== General election ==
=== Candidates ===
- William C. Gibbs, member of the Rhode Island General Assembly 1816–1820.
- Samuel W. Bridgham, Attorney General of Rhode Island 1814–1817.

=== Results ===
1821 Rhode Island gubernatorial election
Party	Candidate	Votes	%	±%
Democratic-Republican	William C. Gibbs	3,790	56.97%	
Federalist	Samuel W. Bridgham	2,801	42.10%	
Independent	Write-in candidates	62	0.93%	
Majority		989	14.87%	
Democratic-Republican hold		Swing		

=== County results ===
County results
County	William Gibbs Democratic-Republican		Samuel Bridgham Federalist		Write-ins Various		Total votes
County	#	%	#	%	#	%	Total votes
Bristol	184	50.0%	184	50.0%	0	0.0%	368
Kent	426	47.9%	463	52.1%	0	0.0%	889
Newport	1,021	81.5%	231	18.5%	0	0.0%	1,252
Providence	1,459	54.2%	1,234	45.8%	0	0.0%	2,693
Washington	700	50.4%	689	49.6%	0	0.0%	1,389
Totals	3,790	56.9%	2,801	42.2%	62 (Note: Tufts 2012 records 62 write-in votes, but does not record which counties those votes were associated with.)	0.9%	6,653
