= George Curtis (banker) =

American banker and politician

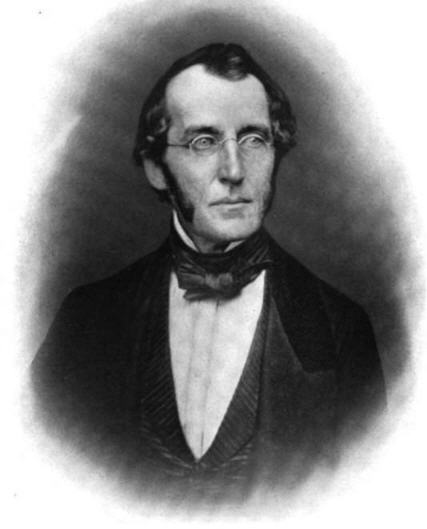

President of the Continental Bank of New York
- In office 1854–1856
- Preceded by: Inaugural holder
- Succeeded by: William T. Hooker

Speaker of the Rhode Island House of Representatives
- In office 1837–1839
- Preceded by: Samuel Y. Atwell
- Succeeded by: Henry Y. Cranston

Personal details
- Born: February 23, 1796 Worcester, Massachusetts
- Died: January 9, 1856 (aged 59) Jacksonville, Florida
- Spouse(s): Mary Elizabeth Burrill (m. 1821; died 1826) Julia Bowen Bridgham (m. 1834; died 1856)
- Relations: Natalie Curtis (granddaughter)
- Children: James Burrill Curtis; George William Curtis; Samuel Bridgham Curtis; Joseph Bridgham Curtis; Edward Curtis; John Green Curtis
- Parent(s): David Curtis; Susannah Stone

George Curtis (February 23, 1796 – January 9, 1856), was an American banker and politician who served as Speaker of the Rhode Island House of Representatives from 1837 to 1839.

== Early life ==
Curtis was born in Worcester, Massachusetts on February 23, 1796. He was the eldest son of David Curtis and Susannah (née Stone) Curtis.

His paternal grandparents were Elizabeth (née Heywood) Curtis and John Curtis of Worcester, a direct descendant of soldier and politician Ephraim Curtis (himself a nephew of Ephraim Curtis, the prominent colonial soldier who fought in King Philip's War). His maternal grandparents were Dorothy (née Fletcher) Stone and Lt. Samuel Stone of Rutland, Massachusetts.

== Career ==
Curtis began his banking career with J.B. Wood in Providence, Rhode Island before becoming cashier of the Exchange Bank of Providence at the age of twenty-three. In 1835, he became treasurer of the Providence and New York Transportation Company, the first steamship and railroad transport company operating between New York City and Boston.

=== Political career ===
While in Providence, he served as a member of the Providence school committee from 1828 to 1837, Warden of the Second Ward of Providence; President of the Common Council from 1834 to 1837, Representative from Providence to the General Assembly from May 1832 to October 1832 and, again, in August 1835, serving through January 1839. In October 1837, he was chosen Speaker of the Assembly and served in that role until January 1839 when he moved to New York. From June 1836 to May 1837, he was also a bank commissioner.

=== Career in New York City ===
Upon the formation of the Bank of Commerce of New York in 1839, he moved to New York City and became cashier of the Bank, holding that position until 1852 when he resigned to become the senior partner of the private banking house of Curtis, Beals & Fearing.

In 1854, upon the formation of the Continental Bank of New York, he was became president of the bank, holding that position until his death in 1856. In 1841, he was elected a member of the New York Chamber of Commerce of which he served as First Vice-president from 1854 until his death. He was heavily involved in the establishment of the New York Clearing House Association in 1853, of which he drafted the constitution, which was adopted in 1854. In that organization, he served as chairman of various committees. He was a trustee of several public and private trusts in New York and served as a member of the finance committee and vice-president of the New England Society of New York for a number of years.

== Personal life ==
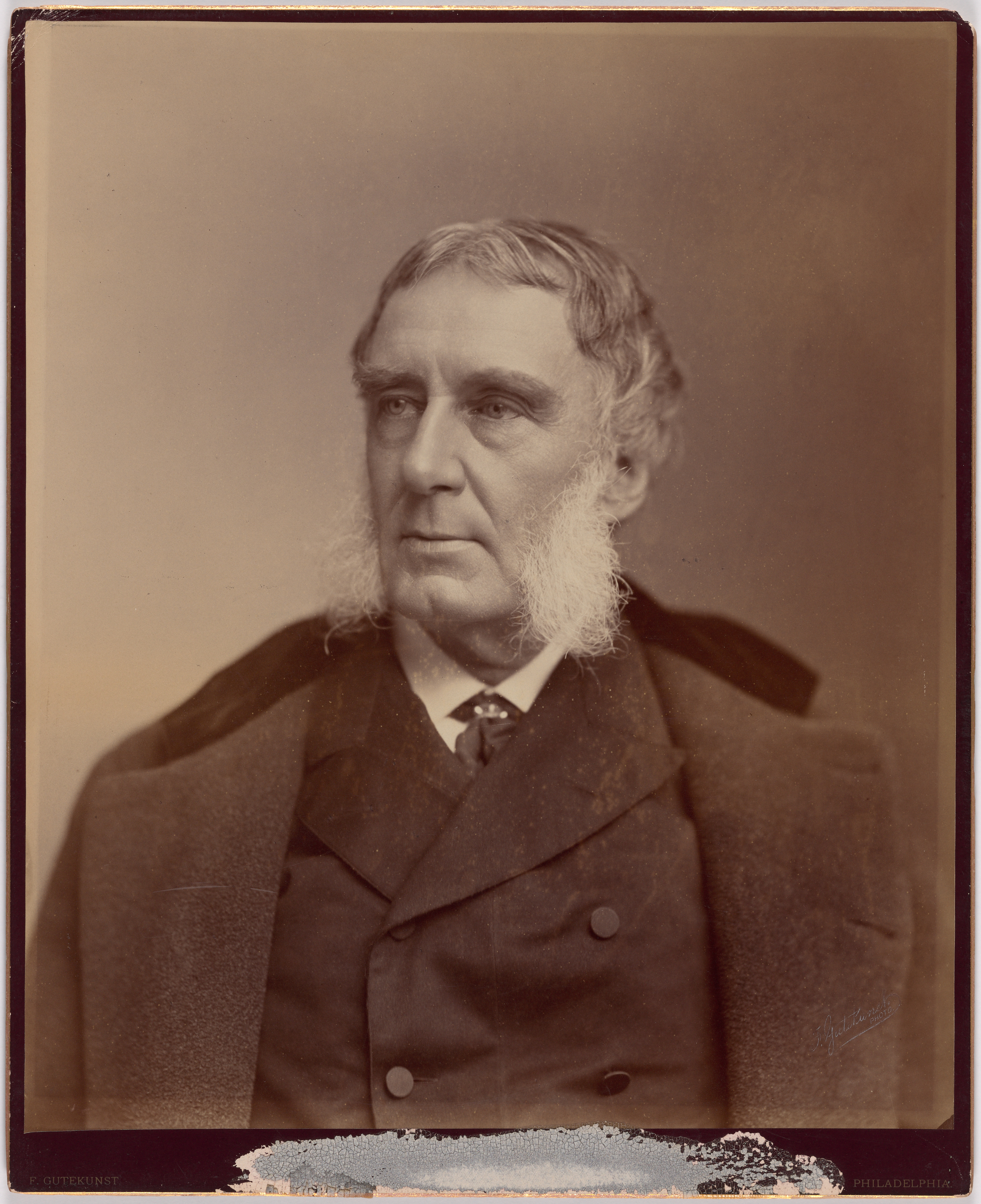
Photograph of his son, George, c. 1885

On March 6, 1821, Curtis was first married to Mary Elizabeth Burrill (1798–1826), a daughter of U.S. Senator James Burrill Jr. and Sally (née Arnold) Burrill. Before her death in July 1826, they were the parents of:

- James Burrill Curtis (1821–1895), chaplain of St Catharine's College, Cambridge who married Mary Tytler, a daughter of James Fraser Tytler, Esq. (son of Alexander Fraser Tytler, Lord Woodhouselee), in 1853.
- George William Curtis (1824–1892), editor of Harper's Weekly who was one of the founders of the Republican Party; he married Anna Shaw, a daughter of abolitionists Francis George Shaw (brother of Quincy Adams Shaw) and Sarah Blake (née Sturgis) Shaw (sister of merchant Russell Sturgis) and sister to Col. Robert Gould Shaw and Josephine Shaw Lowell, in 1856.

On April 3, 1834, he remarried to Julia Bowen Bridgham (1810–1874), the daughter of Elizabeth (née Paine) Bridgham and Samuel W. Bridgham, the first mayor of Providence, Rhode Island who had previously served as Attorney General of Rhode Island (succeeding James Burrill Jr.), and chancellor of Brown University. Before his death, they were the parents of:

- Samuel Bridgham Curtis (1834–1887), a banker who married Louise Kreider Fuller, daughter of Pliny B. Fuller of Providence, in 1867.
- Joseph Bridgham Curtis (1836–1862), a Lt.-Col. of the 4th Rhode Island Infantry Regiment, who was killed at the Battle of Fredericksburg during the U.S. Civil War.
- Edward Curtis (1838–1912), a physician who performed the autopsy on the body of President Abraham Lincoln with Assistant Surgeon J. J. Woodward; he married Augusta Lawler Stacey, daughter of Davis Bevan Stacey, in 1864.
- John Green Curtis (1844–1913), a physiologist who was one of the founding members of the American Physiological Society, he married Martha (née McCook) Davis, widow of Dupont Alexander Davis and daughter of Maj. Daniel McCook, of Ohio. After her death in 1897, he married Netta Easter Blackwood, daughter of Henry James Blackwood, of Norwich, in 1902.

Curtis died in Jacksonville, Florida, where he had gone with his wife and youngest son to restore his health, on January 9, 1856. His body was returned to Providence where he was buried in the North Burial Ground there. His widow died in New York City in December 1874.

=== Descendants ===
Through his son Edward, he was a grandfather of artist Constance Curtis, and authors George De Clyver Curtis, and Natalie Curtis, a prominent ethnomusicologist (who married artist Paul Burlin).

Political offices
Preceded by Samuel Y. Atwell	Speaker of the Rhode Island House of Representatives; 1837–1839	Succeeded by Henry Y. Cranston
