= 1817 Rhode Island gubernatorial election =

- April 16, 1817
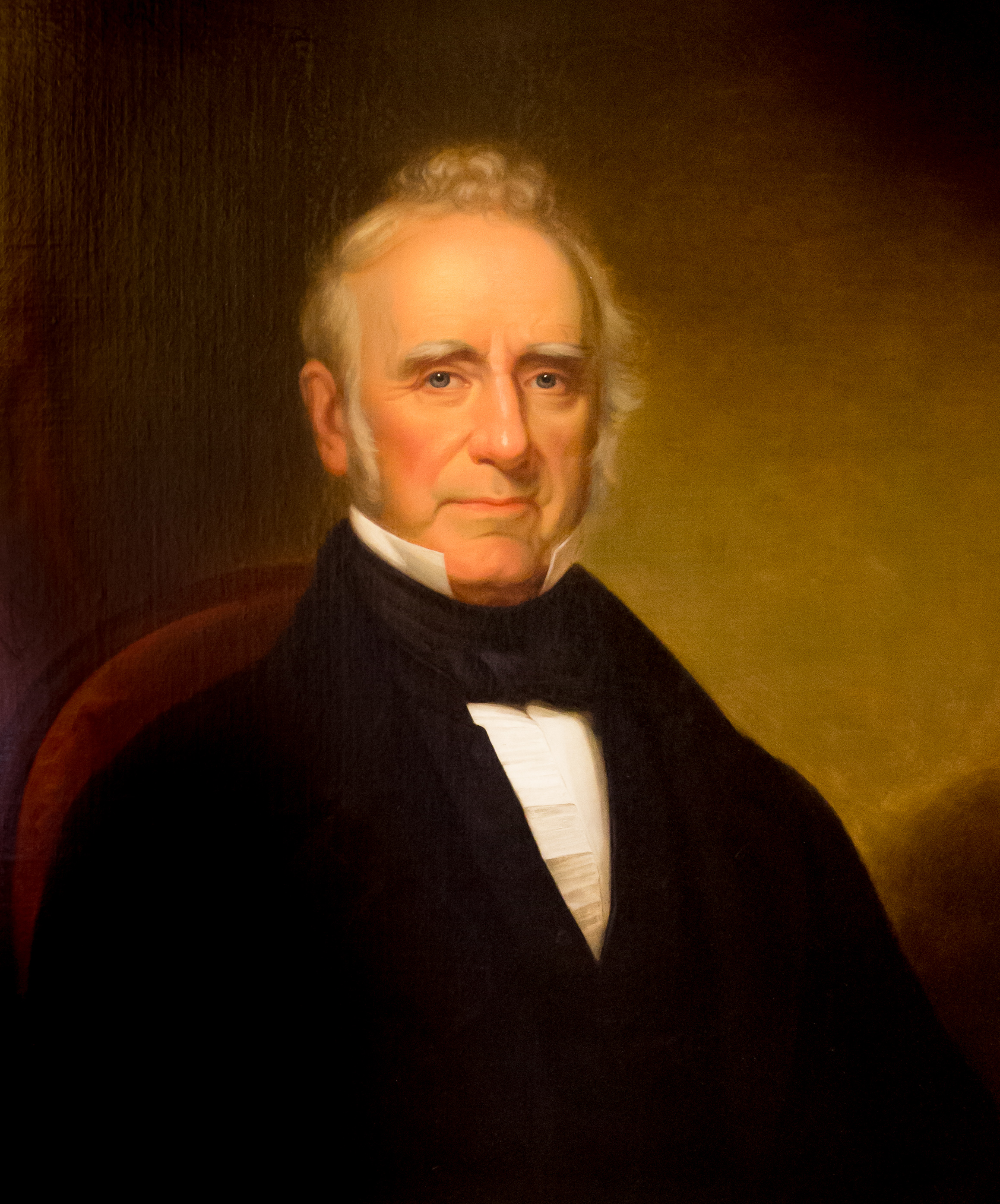

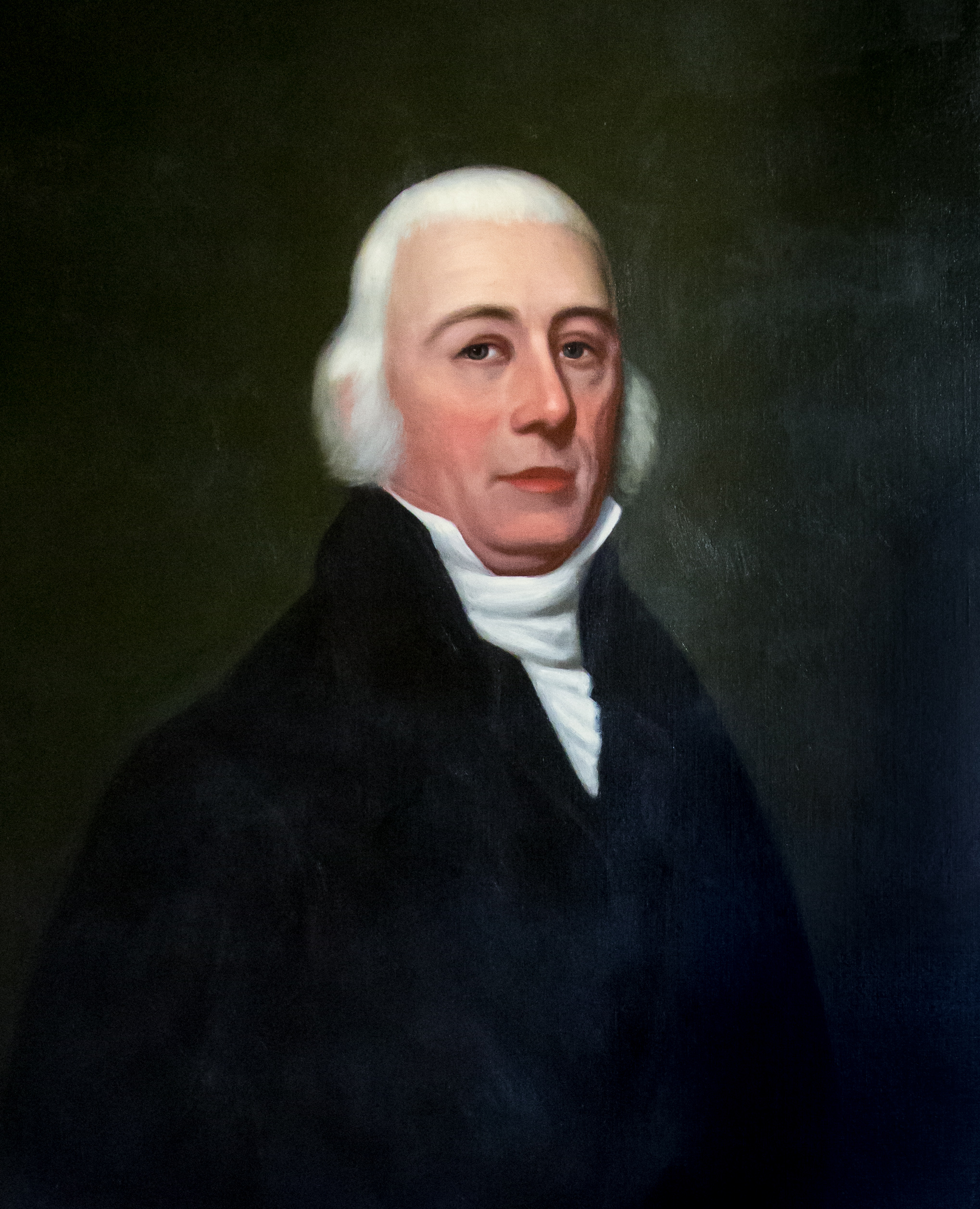
Nominee	Nehemiah R. Knight	William Jones
Party	Democratic-Republican	Federalist
Popular vote	3,949	3,878
Percentage	50.34%	49.51%
- County results Knight: 50–60% Jones: 50–60%
Governor before election
William Jones
Federalist
Elected Governor
Nehemiah R. Knight
Democratic-Republican

The 1817 Rhode Island gubernatorial election was held on April 16, 1817.

Incumbent Federalist Governor William Jones ran for election to a seventh term but was defeated by Democratic-Republican nominee Nehemiah R. Knight.

== General election ==
=== Candidates ===
- Nehemiah R. Knight, Democratic, clerk of the circuit court, collector of customs
- William Jones, Federalist, incumbent governor

=== Results ===
1817 Rhode Island gubernatorial election
Party	Candidate	Votes	%	±%
Democratic-Republican	Nehemiah R. Knight	3,949	50.42%	
Federalist	William Jones	3,878	49.51%	
Scattering		5	0.06%	
Majority		71	0.91%	
Turnout		7,832		
Democratic-Republican gain from Federalist		Swing		

=== County results ===
County results
County	Nehamiah Knight Democratic-Republican		William Jones Federalist		Write-ins Various		Total votes
County	#	%	#	%	#	%	Total votes
Bristol	240	52.86%	214	47.14%	0	0.00%	454
Kent	468	41.79%	650	58.04%	2	0.17%	1,120
Newport	712	50.07%	710	49.93%	0	0.00%	1,422
Providence	1,900	56.38%	1,469	43.59%	1	0.03%	3,370
Washington	629	42.91%	835	56.96%	2	0.13%	1,466
Totals	3,949	50.42%	3,878	49.51%	5	0.06%	7,832
