= 1815 Rhode Island gubernatorial election =

- April 19, 1815
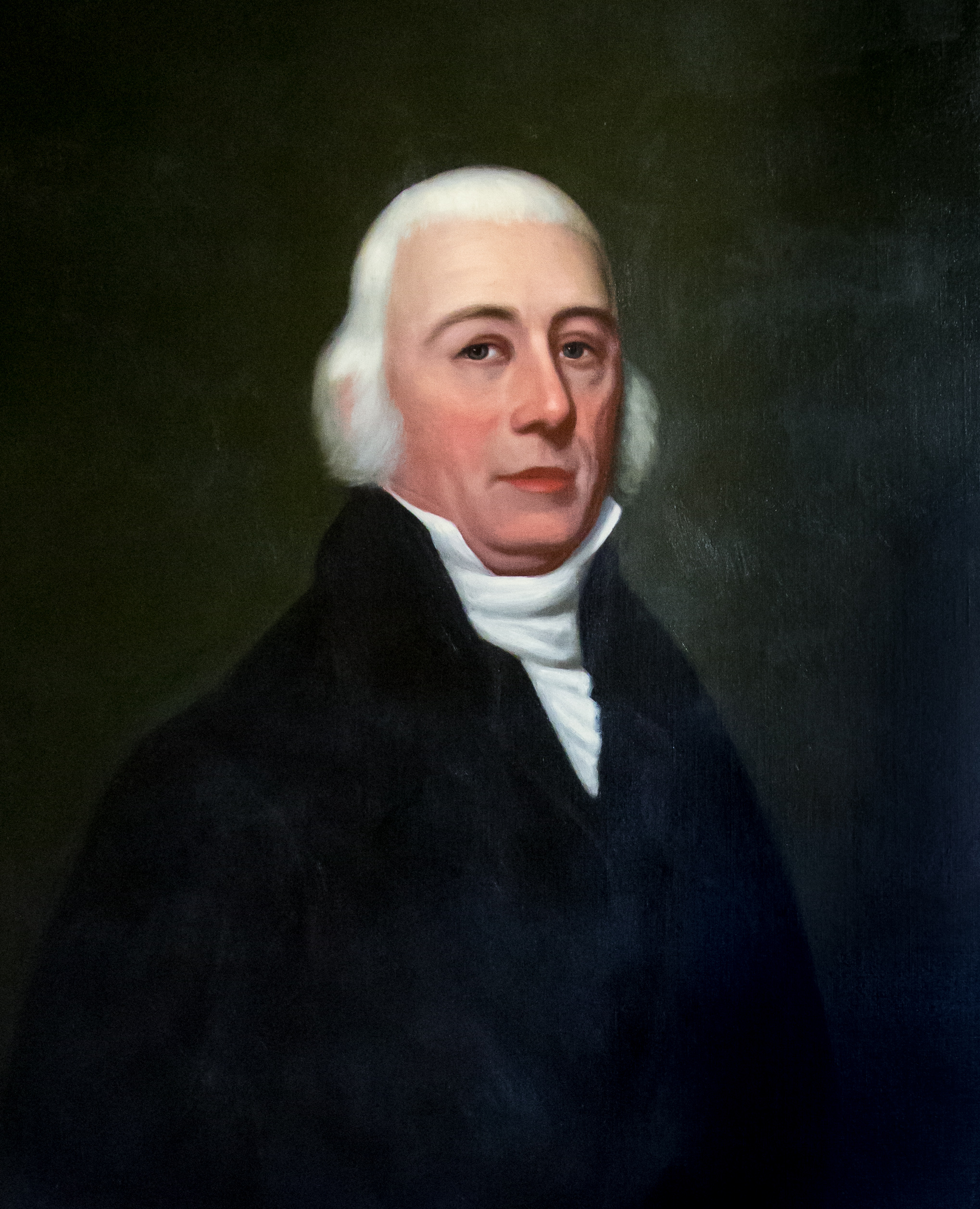

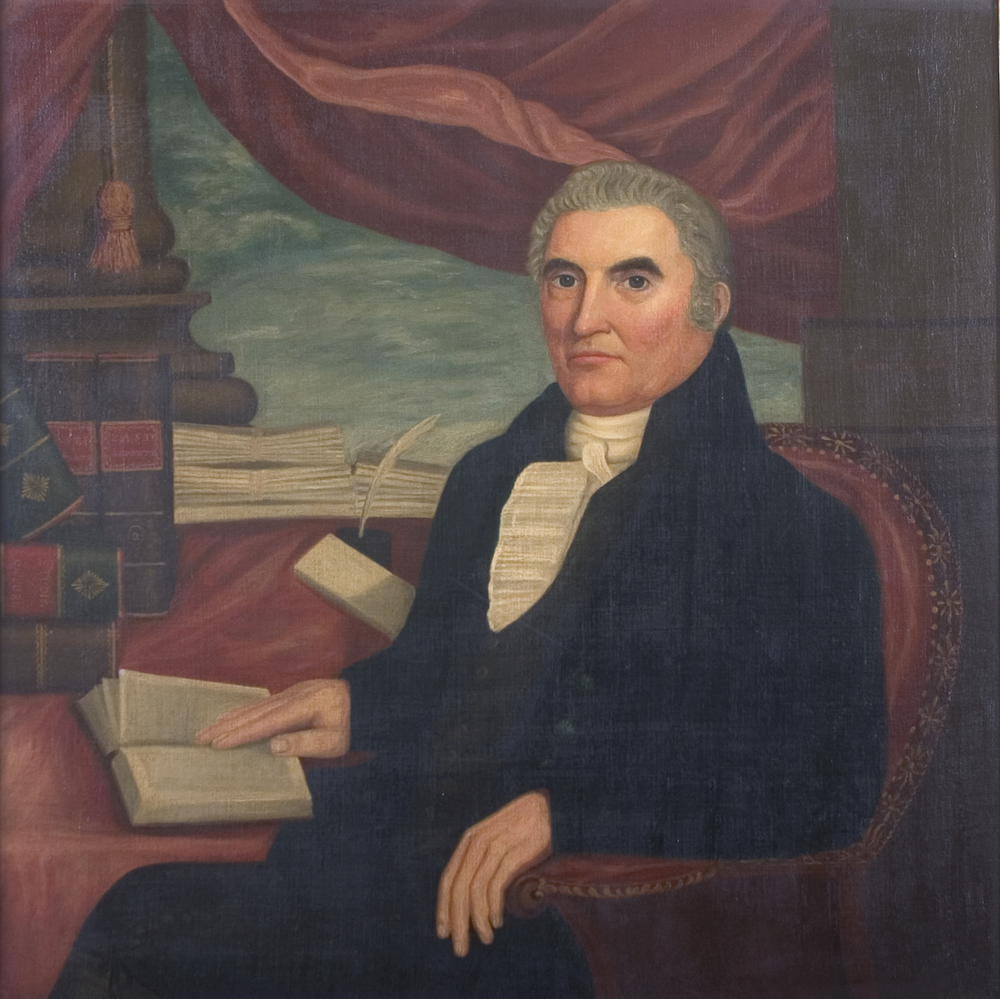
Nominee	William Jones	Peleg Arnold
Party	Federalist	Democratic-Republican
Popular vote	3,372	2,588
Percentage	56.31%	43.22%
- County results Jones: 50–60% 60–70%
Governor before election
William Jones
Federalist
Elected Governor
William Jones
Federalist

The 1815 Rhode Island gubernatorial election was held on April 19, 1815.

Incumbent Federalist Governor William Jones won re-election to a fifth term, defeating Democratic-Republican nominee Peleg Arnold.

== General election ==
=== Candidates ===
- Peleg Arnold, Democratic-Republican, former Chief Justice of the Rhode Island Supreme Court
- William Jones, Federalist, incumbent governor

=== Results ===
1815 Rhode Island gubernatorial election
Party	Candidate	Votes	%	±%
Federalist	William Jones	3,372	56.31%	
Democratic-Republican	Peleg Arnold	2,588	43.22%	
Scattering		28	0.47%	
Majority		784	13.09%	
Turnout		5,988		
Federalist hold		Swing		

=== County results ===
County results
County	William Jones Federalist		Peleg Arnold Democratic-Republican		Scattering Various		Total votes
County	#	%	#	%	#	%	Total votes
Bristol	215	50.35%	209	48.95%	1	0.7%	427
Kent	554	64.64%	301	35.12%	2	0.24%	857
Newport	619	56.53%	464	42.37%	12	1.10%	1,095
Providence	1,384	52.70%	1,232	46.92%	10	0.38%	2,626
Washington	600	60.91%	382	38.78%	3	0.31%	985
Totals	3,372	56.6%	2,588	43.2%	28	0.2%	5,960
