= James Burrill Jr. =

American politician

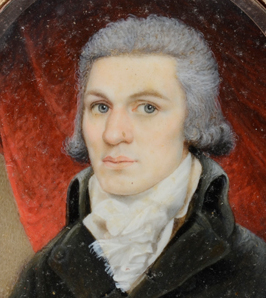
- from a portrait miniature by Edward Greene Malbone

United States Senator from Rhode Island
- In office March 4, 1817 – December 25, 1820
- Preceded by: Jeremiah B. Howell
- Succeeded by: Nehemiah R. Knight

31st Chief Justice of the Rhode Island Supreme Court
- In office 1816–1817
- Preceded by: Daniel Lyman
- Succeeded by: Tristam Burges

45th Attorney General of Rhode Island
- In office 1797–1814
- Governor: Arthur Fenner; Henry Smith; Isaac Wilbour; James Fenner; William Jones
- Preceded by: Ray Greene
- Succeeded by: Samuel W. Bridgham

Personal details
- Born: April 25, 1772 Providence, Rhode Island
- Died: December 25, 1820 (aged 48) Washington, D.C., U.S.
- Party: Federalist
- Education: Brown University 1788

James Burrill Jr. (April 25, 1772 – December 25, 1820) was a Federalist-party United States senator representing the state of Rhode Island. He served in the Senate from 1817 until 1820, and was previously the Chief Justice of the Rhode Island Supreme Court in 1816 and 1817 and the state's attorney general from 1797 to 1814. He graduated from the College of Rhode Island and Providence Plantations (the former name of Brown University) at Providence in 1788. In 1797, he was an unsuccessful candidate in a special election for Congress.

Burrill was elected a member of the American Antiquarian Society in 1815.

The town of Burrillville, Rhode Island, is named for him. His grandson is the American writer and public speaker, George William Curtis.

Burrill died of tuberculosis in Washington, D.C., on December 25, 1820. He was interred in the Congressional Cemetery.

== See also ==
- List of members of the United States Congress who died in office (1790–1899)

Legal offices
Preceded by Ray Greene	Attorney General of Rhode Island; 1797–1814	Succeeded by Samuel W. Bridgham
U.S. Senate
Preceded by Jeremiah B. Howell	U.S. senator (Class 2) from Rhode Island; 1817–1820; Served alongside: William Hunter	Succeeded by Nehemiah R. Knight
