= 1822 Rhode Island gubernatorial election =

- April 17, 1822
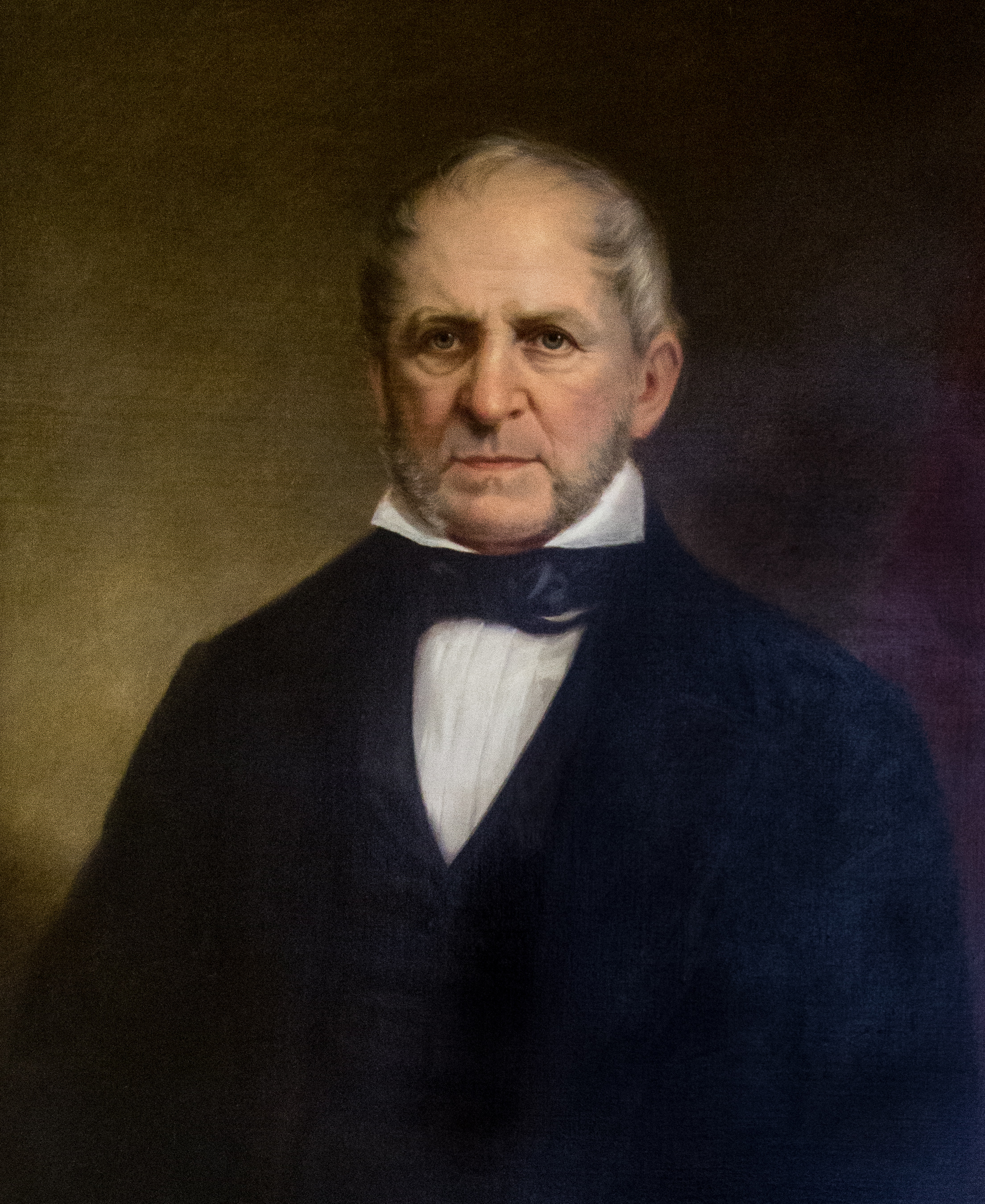
| Nominee | William C. Gibbs |
| Party | Democratic-Republican |
| Popular vote | 2,092 |
| Percentage | 100.00% |
- County results Gibbs: 90–100%
Governor before election
William C. Gibbs
Democratic-Republican
Elected Governor
William C. Gibbs
Democratic-Republican

The 1822 Rhode Island gubernatorial election was an uncontested election held on April 17, 1822, to elect the governor of Rhode Island. William C. Gibbs, the Democratic-Republican nominee, was the only candidate and so won with 100% of the vote.

== General election ==
=== Candidates ===
- William C. Gibbs, Governor since 1821.

=== Results ===
1822 Rhode Island gubernatorial election
| Party | Candidate | Votes | % | ±% |
|---|---|---|---|---|
| Democratic-Republican | William C. Gibbs (incumbent) | 2,092 | 100.00% | |
| Majority | | 2,092 | 100.00% | |
| Democratic-Republican hold | | Swing | | |

=== County results ===
County results
| County | William Gibbs Democratic-Republican | | Total votes |
| County | # | % | Total votes |
|---|---|---|---|
| Bristol | 141 | 100% | 141 |
| Kent | 349 | 100% | 349 |
| Newport | 514 | 100% | 514 |
| Providence | 755 | 100% | 755 |
| Washington | 333 | 100% | 333 |
| Totals | 2,092 | 100% | 2,092 |
