= 1818 Rhode Island gubernatorial election =

- April 15, 1818
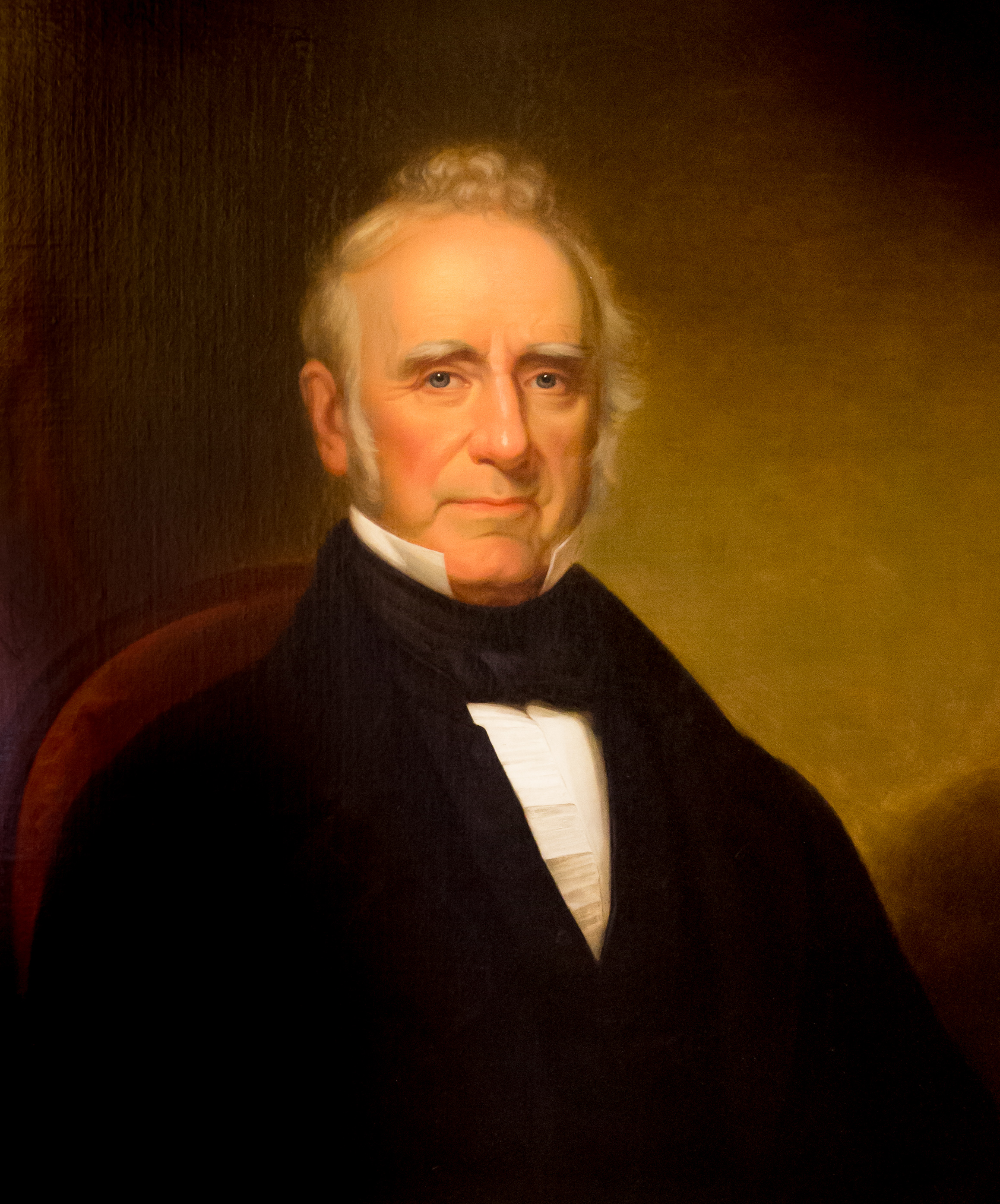

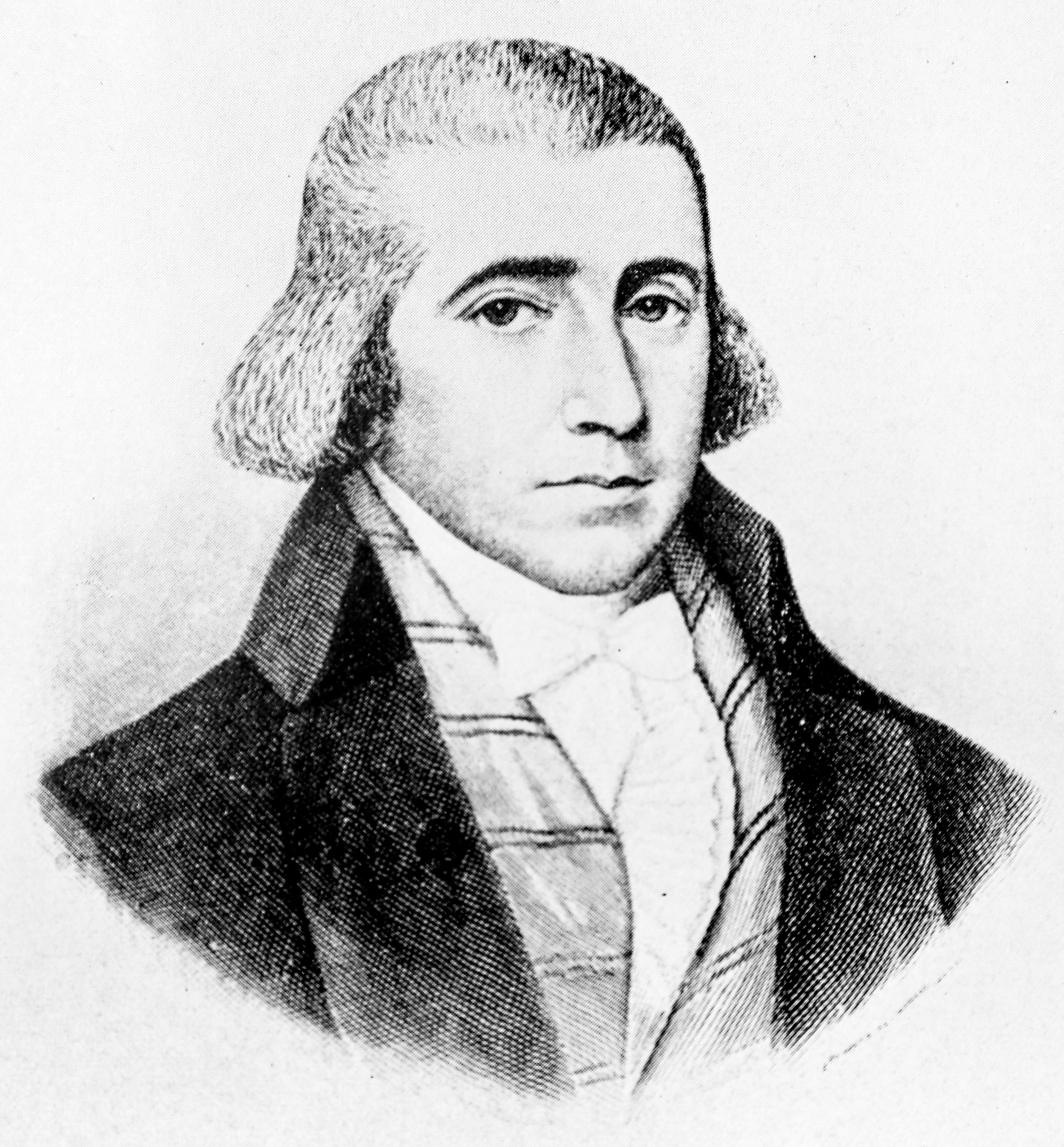
Nominee	Nehemiah Rice Knight	Elisha Reynolds Potter
Party	Democratic-Republican	Federalist
Popular vote	4,509	3,895
Percentage	53.60%	46.30%
- County results Knight: 50–60% 70–80% Potter: 50–60% 60–70%
Governor before election
Nehemiah Rice Knight
Democratic-Republican
Elected Governor
Nehemiah Rice Knight
Democratic-Republican

The 1818 Rhode Island gubernatorial election was an election held on April 15, 1818, to elect the governor of Rhode Island. Nehemiah Rice Knight, the incumbent governor and Democratic-Republican nominee, beat Elisha Reynolds Potter, the Federalist candidate with 53.60% of the vote.

== General election ==
=== Candidates ===
- Nehemiah Rice Knight, the incumbent governor since 1817.
- Elisha R. Potter, member of the US House of Representatives for Rhode Island 1809–1815.

=== Results ===
1818 Rhode Island gubernatorial election
Party	Candidate	Votes	%	±%
Democratic-Republican	Nehemiah Rice Knight (incumbent)	4,509	53.7%	
Federalist	Elisha Reynolds Potter	3,895	46.3%	
Majority		614	7.3%	
Democratic-Republican hold		Swing		

=== County results ===
County results
County	Nehamiah Knight Democratic-Republican		Elisha Potter Federalist		Total votes
County	#	%	#	%	Total votes
Bristol	261	55.3%	211	44.7%	472
Kent	601	49.3%	617	50.7%	1,218
Newport	774	38.5%	1,228	61.5%	2,002
Providence	2,108	70.9%	866	29.1%	2,974
Washington	765	44.0%	973	56.0%	1,738
Totals	4,509	53.7%	3,895	46.3%	8,404
