= 1816 Rhode Island gubernatorial election =

- April 17, 1816
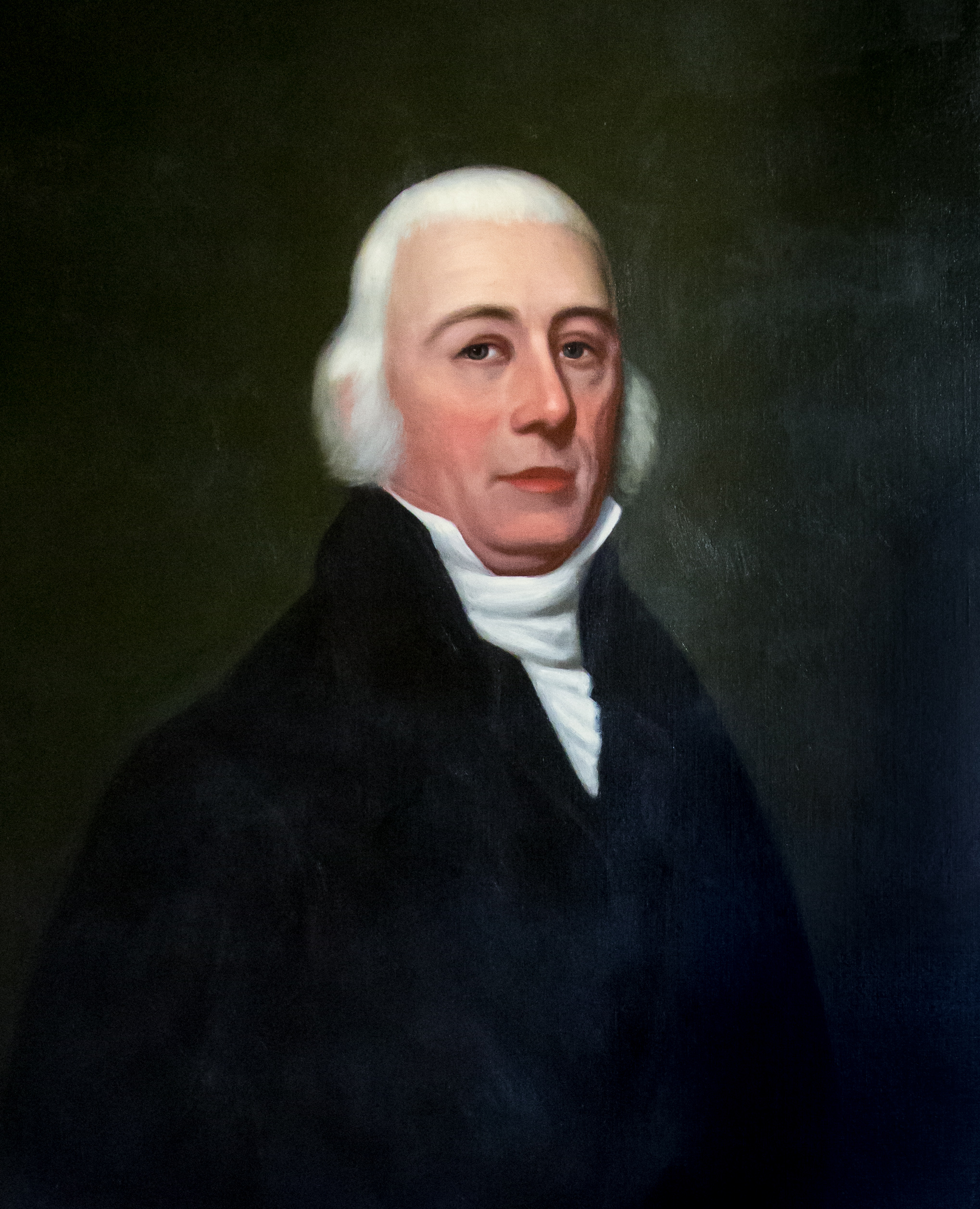

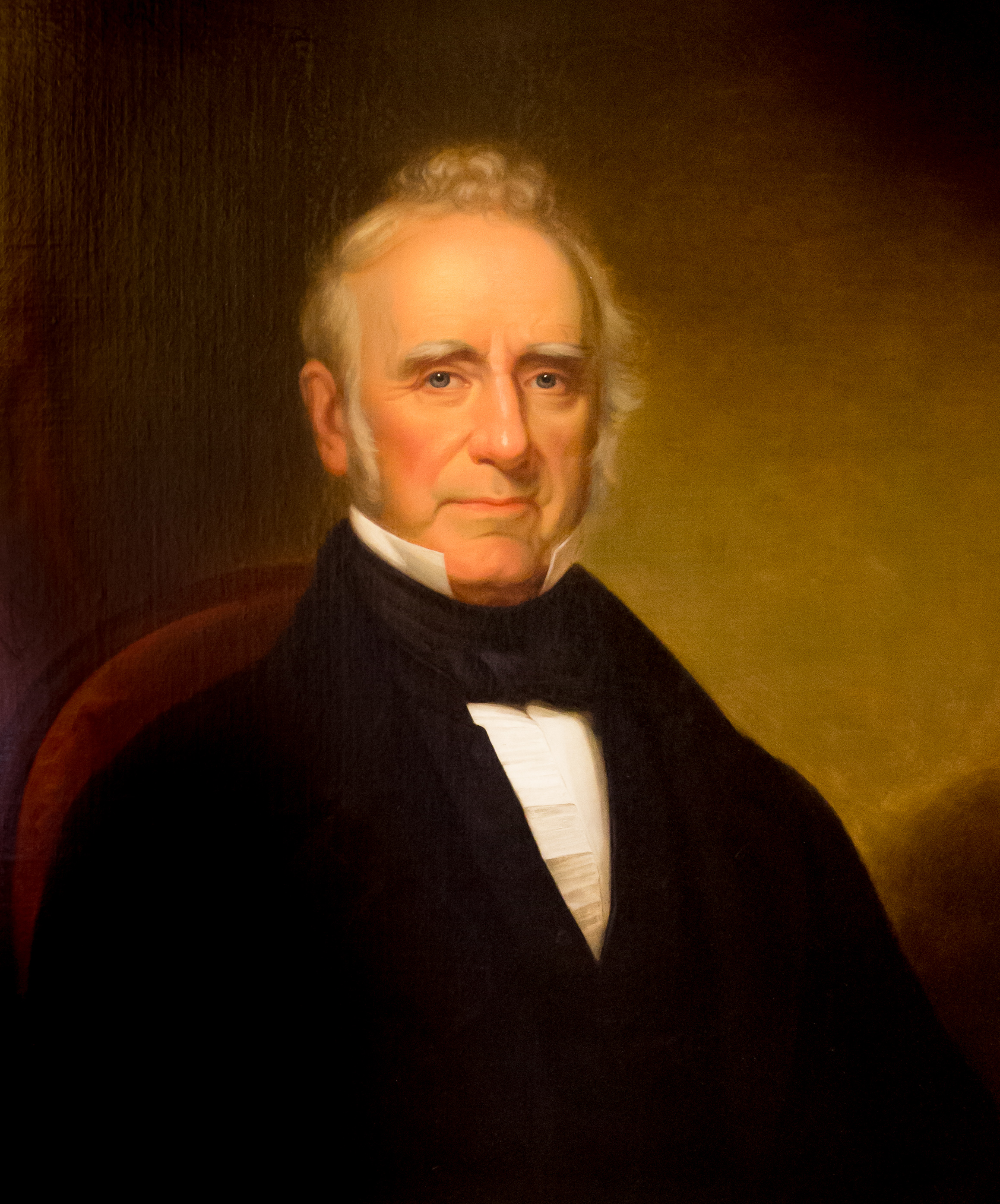
Nominee	William Jones	Nehemiah R. Knight
Party	Federalist	Democratic-Republican
Popular vote	3,591	3,259
Percentage	52.35%	47.51%
- County results Jones: 50–60% 60–70% Knight: 50–60%
Governor before election
William Jones
Federalist
Elected Governor
William Jones
Federalist

The 1816 Rhode Island gubernatorial election was held on April 17, 1816.

Incumbent Federalist Governor William Jones won re-election to a sixth term, defeating Democratic-Republican nominee Nehemiah R. Knight.

== General election ==
=== Candidates ===
- Nehemiah R. Knight, Democratic-Republican, clerk of the circuit court, collector of customs
- William Jones, Federalist, incumbent governor

=== Results ===
1816 Rhode Island gubernatorial election
Party	Candidate	Votes	%	±%
Federalist	William Jones	3,591	52.35%	
Democratic-Republican	Nehemiah R. Knight	3,259	47.51%	
Write-in		10	0.15%	
Majority		332	4.84%	
Turnout		6,860		
Federalist hold		Swing		

=== County results ===
County results
County	William Jones Federalist		Nehemiah Knight Democratic-Republican		Write-in Various		Total votes
County	#	%	#	%	#	%	Total votes
Bristol	224	48.9%	234	51.1%	0	-	458
Kent	606	61.2%	383	38.8%	1	-	990
Newport	632	51.1%	606	48.9%	2	-	1240
Providence	1451	48.1%	1573	51.9%	6	-	3,030
Washington	678	59.1%	463	40.9%	1	-	1,142
Totals	3,591	52.4%	3,259	3,259	10	-	6,860
