= 1823 Rhode Island gubernatorial election =

- April 16, 1823
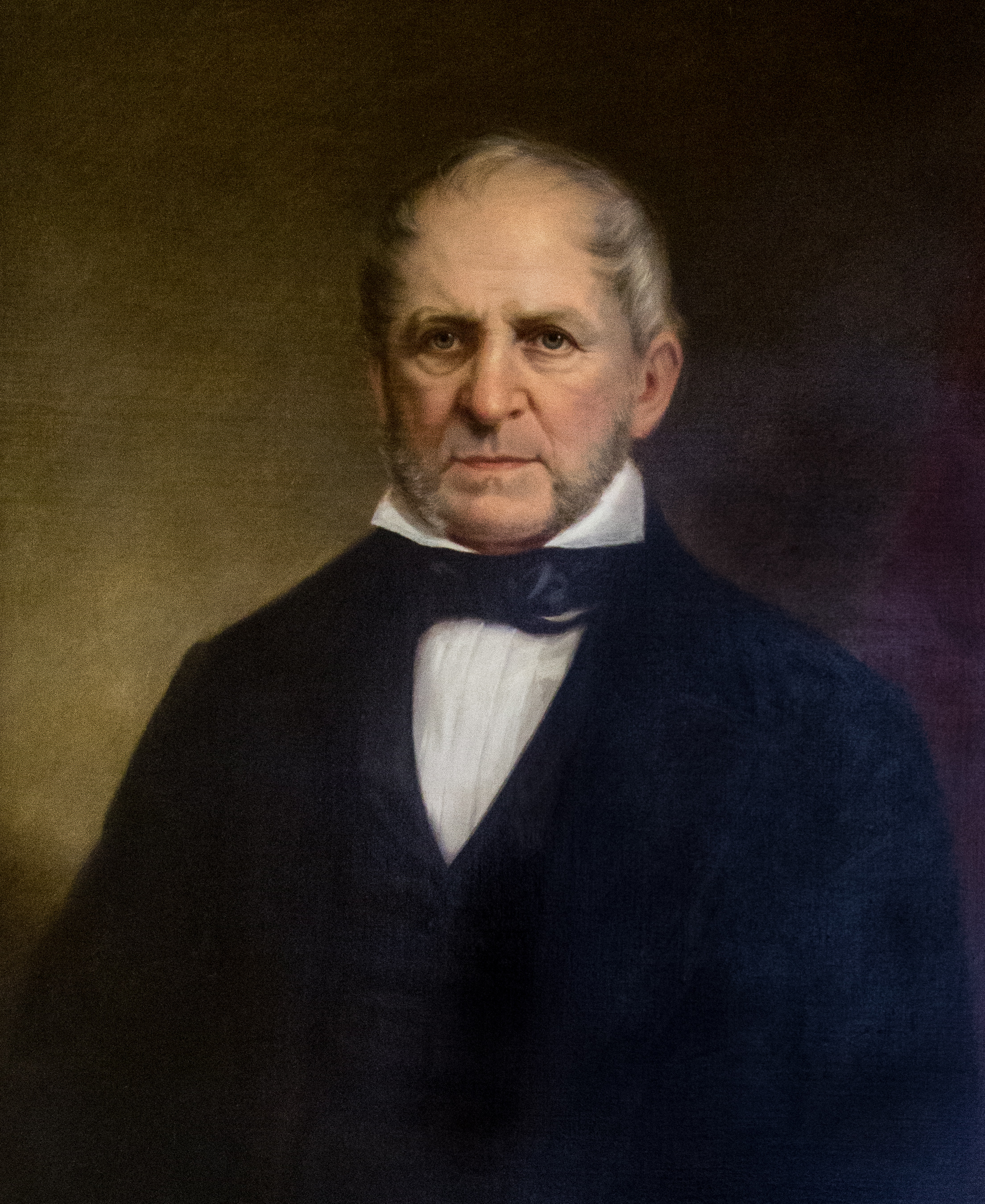
Nominee	William C. Gibbs
Party	Democratic-Republican
Popular vote	1,647
Percentage	100.00%
- County results Gibbs: 90–100%
Governor before election
William C. Gibbs
Democratic-Republican
Elected Governor
William C. Gibbs
Democratic-Republican

The 1823 Rhode Island gubernatorial election was an uncontested election held on April 16, 1823, to elect the governor of Rhode Island. William C. Gibbs, the Democratic-Republican nominee, was the only candidate and so won with 100% of the vote.

== General election ==
=== Candidates ===
- William C. Gibbs, Governor since 1821.

=== Results ===
1823 Rhode Island gubernatorial election
Party	Candidate	Votes	%	±%
Democratic-Republican	William C. Gibbs (incumbent)	1,647	100.00%	
Majority		1,647	100.00%	
Democratic-Republican hold		Swing		
