= 1819 Rhode Island gubernatorial election =

- April 21, 1819
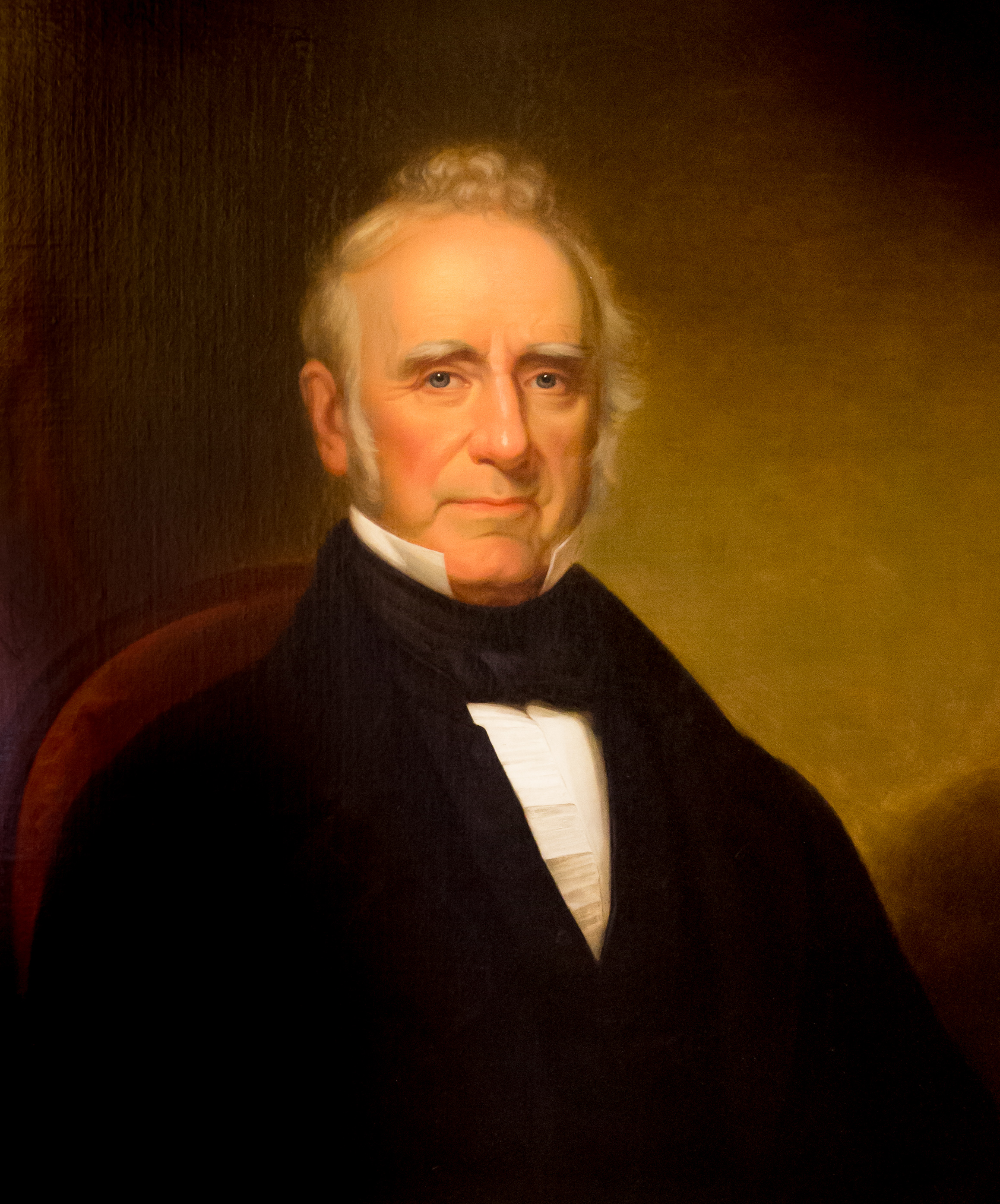
Nominee	Nehemiah Rice Knight
Party	Democratic-Republican
Popular vote	2,664
Percentage	100.00%
- County results Knight: 90–100%
Governor before election
Nehemiah Rice Knight
Democratic-Republican
Elected Governor
Nehemiah Rice Knight
Democratic-Republican

The 1819 Rhode Island gubernatorial election was an uncontested election held on April 21, 1819, to elect the governor of Rhode Island. Nehemiah Rice Knight, the incumbent governor and Democratic-Republican nominee, was the only candidate and so won with 100% of the vote.

== General election ==
=== Candidates ===
- Nehemiah Rice Knight, the incumbent governor since 1817.

=== Results ===
1819 Rhode Island gubernatorial election
Party	Candidate	Votes	%	±%
Democratic-Republican	Nehemiah Rice Knight (incumbent)	2,670	100.00%	
Majority		2,670	100.00%	
Democratic-Republican hold		Swing		

=== By county ===
County results
County	Nehemiah Knight Democratic-Republican
Bristol	175
Kent	473
Newport	518
Providence	1,056
Washington	448
Totals	2,670
