= 1820 Rhode Island gubernatorial election =

- April 19, 1820
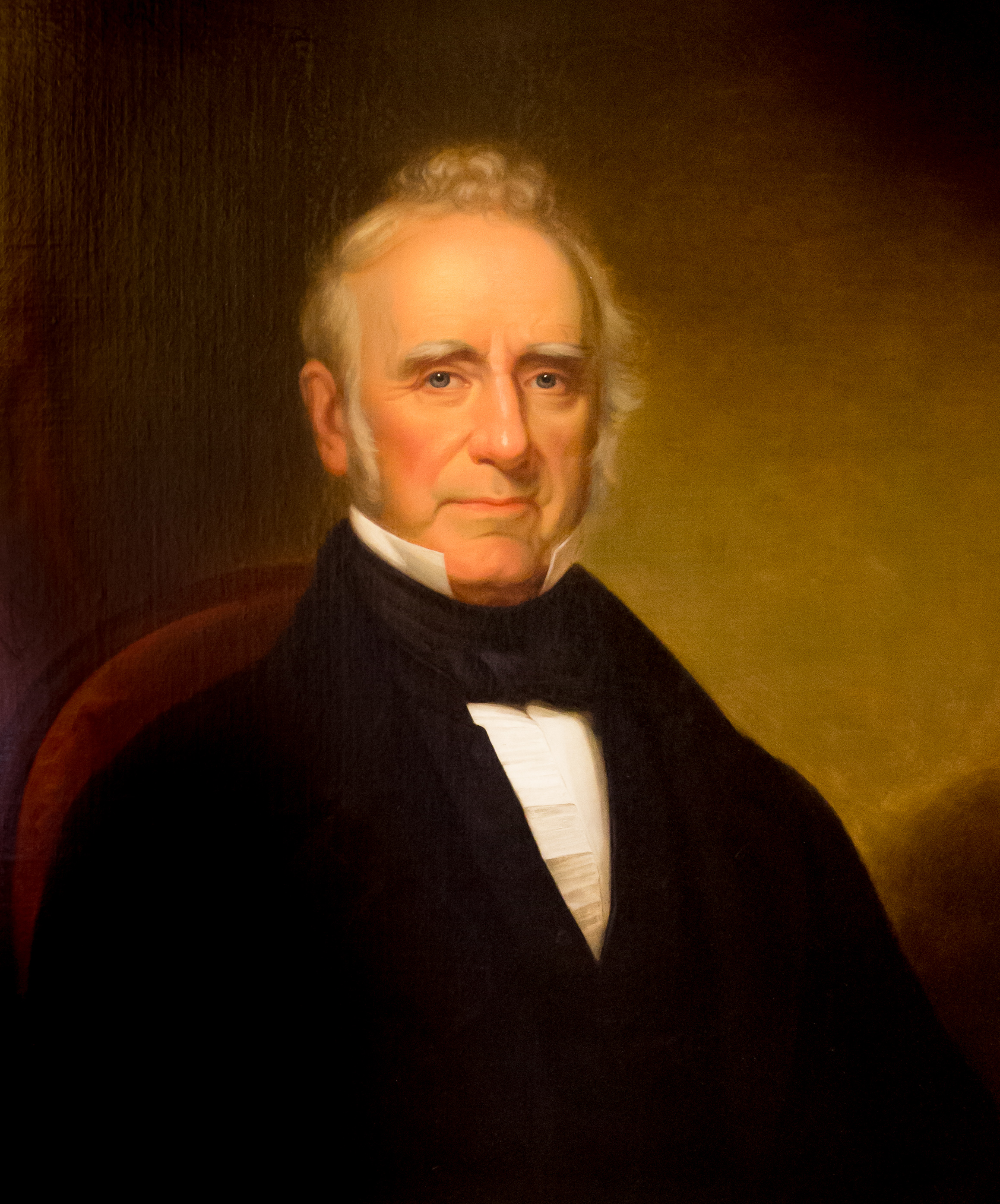
Nominee	Nehemiah Rice Knight
Party	Democratic-Republican
Popular vote	1,981
Percentage	100.00%
- County results Knight: 90–100%
Governor before election
Nehemiah Rice Knight
Democratic-Republican
Elected Governor
Nehemiah Rice Knight
Democratic-Republican

The 1820 Rhode Island gubernatorial election was an uncontested election held on April 19, 1820, to elect the governor of Rhode Island. Nehemiah Rice Knight, the incumbent governor and Democratic-Republican nominee, was the only candidate and so won with 100% of the vote.

== General election ==
=== Candidates ===
- Nehemiah Rice Knight, the incumbent governor since 1817.

=== Results ===
1819 Rhode Island gubernatorial election
Party	Candidate	Votes	%	±%
Democratic-Republican	Nehemiah Rice Knight (incumbent)	1,981	100.00%	
Majority		1,981	100.00%	
Democratic-Republican hold		Swing		

=== County results ===
County results
County	Nehemiah Knight Democratic-Republican		Total votes
County	#	%	Total votes
Bristol	75	100%	75
Kent	408	100%	408
Newport	251	100%	251
Providence	850	100%	850
Washington	397	100%	397
Totals	1,981	100%	1,981
