= Nehemiah R. Knight =

American politician (1780–1854)

Nehemiah Rice Knight
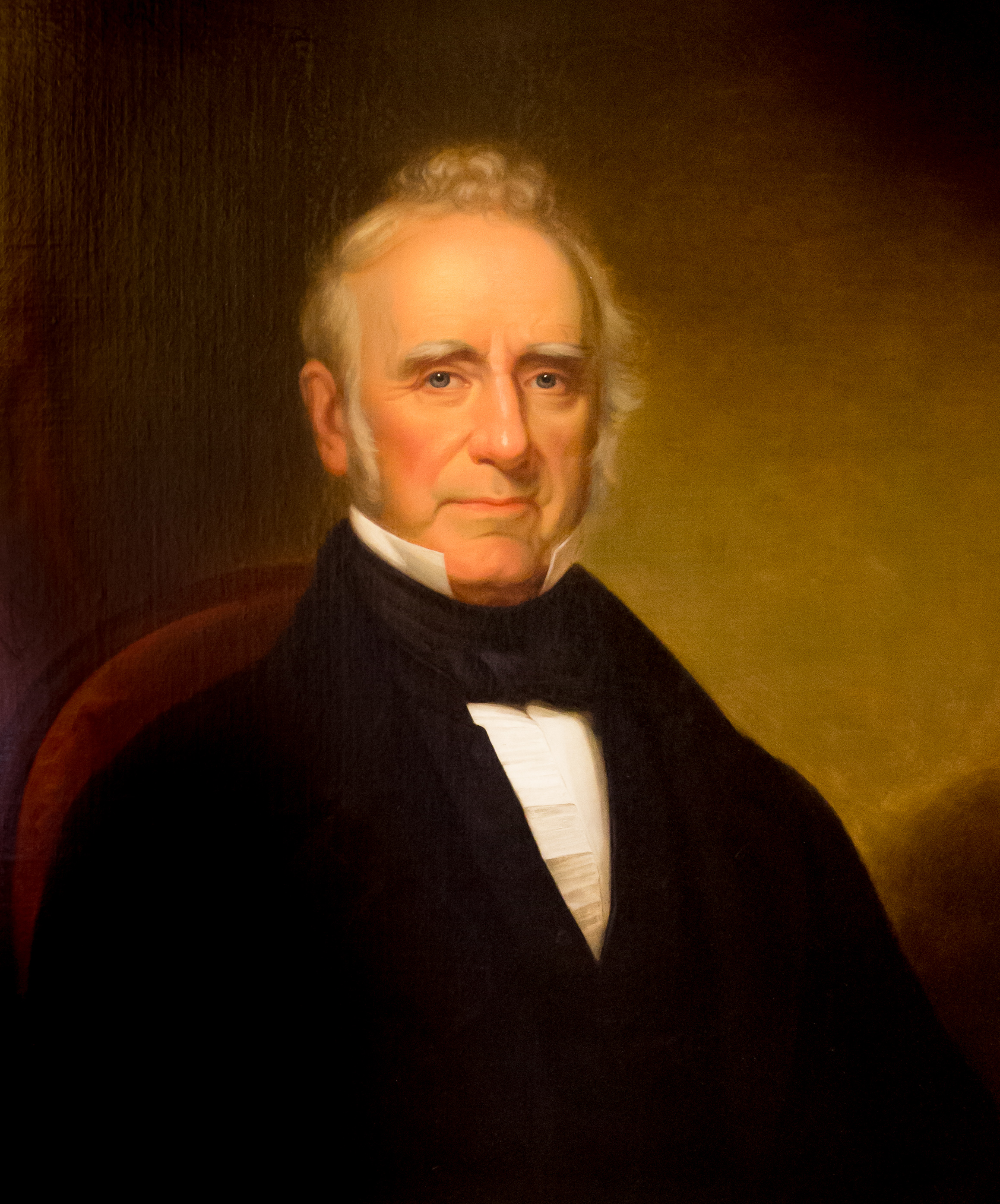

9th Governor of Rhode Island
- In office May 7, 1817 – May 2, 1821
- Lieutenant: Edward Wilcox
- Preceded by: William Jones
- Succeeded by: William C. Gibbs

United States Senator from Rhode Island
- In office January 9, 1821 – March 3, 1841
- Preceded by: James Burrill, Jr.
- Succeeded by: James F. Simmons

Member of the Rhode Island House of Representatives
- In office 1802

Personal details
- Born: December 31, 1780 Cranston, Rhode Island
- Died: April 18, 1854 (aged 73) Providence, Rhode Island, U.S.
- Resting place: Grace Church Cemetery, Providence
- Party: Democratic-Republican, National Republican, Whig
- Spouse: Lydia Waterman Knight
- Parent: Nehemiah Knight
- Profession: Politician, Clerk

Nehemiah Rice Knight (December 31, 1780 – April 18, 1854) was Governor of Rhode Island and United States Senator from Rhode Island.

Born in Cranston, he attended the common schools. In 1802 he was a member of the Rhode Island House of Representatives; he moved to Providence and was clerk of the Court of Common Pleas from 1805 to 1811 and clerk of the circuit court from 1812 to 1817. He was also collector of customs for the same period. He was the ninth Governor of Rhode Island from 1817 to 1821 and president of the Roger Williams Bank from 1817 to 1854.

Knight was elected in 1821 as a Democratic-Republican to the U.S. Senate to fill the vacancy caused by the death of James Burrill, Jr.; he was re-elected in 1823 as a Crawford Republican, in 1829 as an Anti-Jacksonian, and again in 1835 as a Whig, and served from January 9, 1821, to March 3, 1841. While in the Senate he was chairman of the committee to Audit and Control the Contingent Expenses (Twenty-second, Twenty-third and Twenty-sixth Congresses) and a member of the Committee on Manufactures (Twenty-fourth Congress). Knight retired from public life and was a delegate to the State constitutional convention in 1843. He died in Providence in 1854; interment was in Grace Church Cemetery.

Nehemiah Rice Knight's father, Nehemiah Knight, had been a U.S. Representative from Rhode Island.

Party political offices
| Preceded by Peleg Arnold | Democratic-Republican Party nominee for Governor of Rhode Island; 1816, 1817, 1818, 1819, 1820 | Succeeded by William C. Gibbs |
| First | Whig nominee for Governor of Rhode Island; 1834, 1835 | Succeeded by Tristam Burges |
Political offices
| Preceded by William Jones | 9th Governor of Rhode Island; 1817–1821 | Succeeded by William C. Gibbs |
U.S. Senate
| Preceded by James Burrill, Jr. | U.S. senator (Class 2) from Rhode Island; January 9, 1821 – March 3, 1841; Served alongside: William Hunter, James De Wolf, Asher Robbins and Nathan F. Dixon | Succeeded by James F. Simmons |
