= George Curtis (cricketer) =

Australian cricketer

Personal information
- Born: 17 August 1837; Sydney, Australia
- Died: 2 April 1885 (aged 47); Sydney, Australia
- Source: ESPNcricinfo, 25 December 2016

George Curtis (17 August 1837 – 2 April 1885) was an Australian cricketer. He played two first-class matches for New South Wales between 1861/62 and 1865/66.

== See also ==
- List of New South Wales representative cricketers
