= William C. Gibbs =

American politician (1789–1871)

William Channing Gibbs
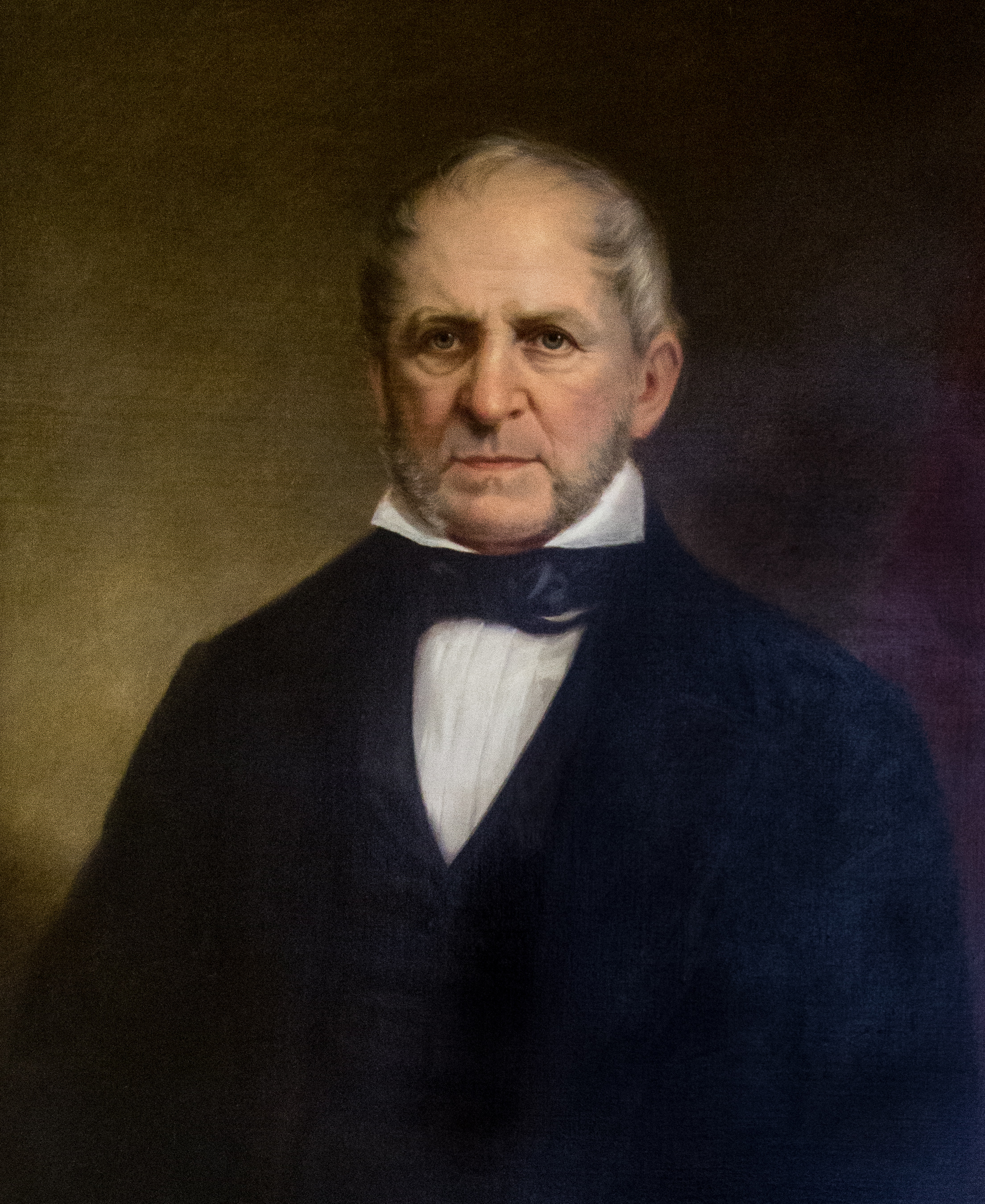
- Portrait by James Sullivan Lincoln

10th Governor of Rhode Island
- In office May 2, 1821 – May 5, 1824
- Lieutenant Governor: Caleb Earle
- Preceded by: Nehemiah R. Knight
- Succeeded by: James Fenner

Personal details
- Born: February 10, 1787 Newport, Rhode Island
- Died: February 21, 1871 (aged 84) Newport, Rhode Island, U.S.
- Resting place: Island Cemetery, Newport, Rhode Island
- Spouse: Mary Kane

William Channing Gibbs (February 10, 1787 – February 21, 1871) was the tenth governor of Rhode Island from 1821 to 1824.

== Early life ==
Gibbs was born in Newport, Rhode Island, the son of George Gibbs II and Mary Channing. He served in the state militia, rising to the rank of major general.

== Family ==
Gibbs was married to Mary Kane, with whom he had ten children.

One daughter, Sarah Gibbs, married Robert Means Thompson, a naval officer, business executive and president of the American Olympic Association. Thompson also served as the Commander-in-Chief of the Military Order of the Loyal Legion of the United States.

His son, Theodore K. Gibbs (born in 1840), served in the Union Army during the American Civil War. He was commissioned a 2nd lieutenant in the 1st Artillery in October 1861 and was promoted to 1st lieutenant in February 1862. He received brevets (honorary promotions) to the ranks of captain and major for gallantry in action at the battles of Olustee, Florida and Cold Harbor, Virginia respectively. He was a companion of the Massachusetts Commandery of the Military Order of the Loyal Legion of the United States. He resigned from the Army in May 1870 and lived in New York City and Newport, Rhode Island until his death in 1909.

Another son, Eugene Beauharnais Gibbs (born in 1833), served as a captain in the 2nd California Infantry during the Civil War. After the war, he was commissioned as a 2nd lieutenant the 8th Infantry in the Regular Army, rose to the rank of captain, and served until his death in 1882.

Gibbs' brother, George Gibbs (1776-1833) was a noted mineralogist and was the father of Brevet Major General Alfred Gibbs (1823-1868) who served with distinction in both the Mexican War and the Civil War.

== Political career ==
Gibbs was a representative in Rhode Island's General Assembly from 1816 to 1820. He served as governor from May 2, 1821, to May 5, 1824.

During the three terms that he was governor, the state ballot held the question of expanding suffrage, but it was constantly rejected. In his last term, a Constitutional Convention drafted a document about voting rights, nevertheless, the proposed State Constitution was rejected by the voters.

Gibbs died on February 21, 1871, at the age of 84 and is buried in the Island Cemetery in Newport with his wife and his son Theodore Kane Gibbs.

Party political offices
Preceded by Nehemiah R. Knight	Democratic-Republican Party nominee for Governor of Rhode Island; 1821, 1822, 1823	Succeeded by James Fenner
Political offices
Preceded by Nehemiah R. Knight	Governor of Rhode Island; 1821–1824	Succeeded by James Fenner
