= George William Curtis =

American journalist (1824–1892)

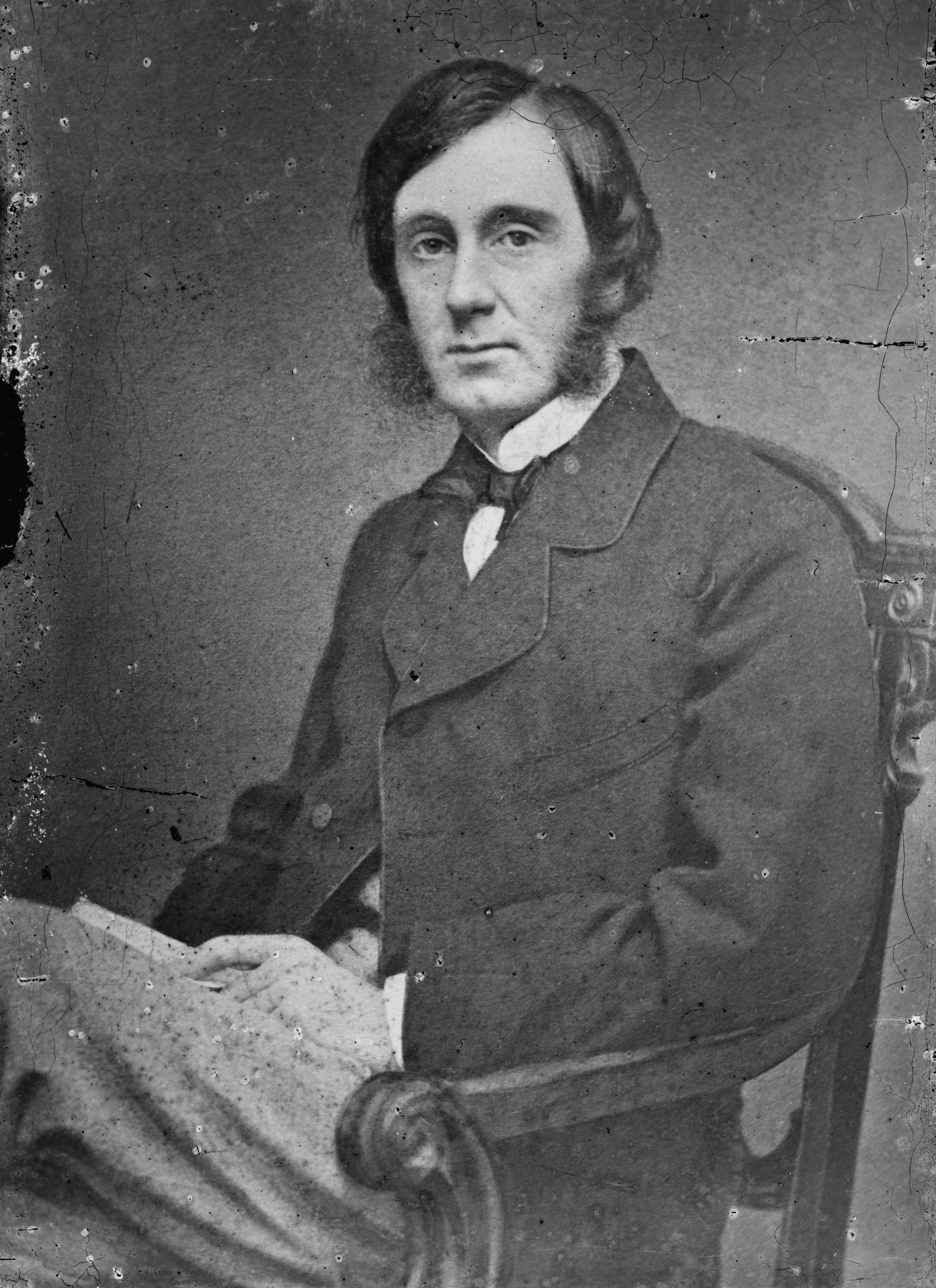
- Curtis between 1855 and 1865
- Born: February 24, 1824; Providence, Rhode Island, U.S.
- Died: August 31, 1892 (aged 68); New York City, New York, U.S.
- Occupations: Writer, editor
- Political party: Republican

George William Curtis (February 24, 1824 – August 31, 1892) was an American writer, reformer, public speaker, and political activist. He was an abolitionist and supporter of civil rights for African Americans and Native Americans. He also advocated women's suffrage, civil service reform, and public education.

== Early life and education ==
George William Curtis was born in Providence, Rhode Island on February 24, 1824. His father was also named George Curtis. His mother, Mary Elizabeth (Burrill) Curtis, was the daughter of former United States Senator James Burrill Jr. and died when the infant George was two years old.

At six, George was sent with his elder brother James Burrill Curtis to school in Jamaica Plain, Massachusetts, where he remained for five years. In 1835, his father having remarried happily, the boys were brought home to Providence, where they stayed until around 1839, when they moved with their father to New York. Three years later, George and James fell in sympathy with the spirit of the transcendental movement and joined the Brook Farm communal experiment from 1842 to 1843. After leaving Brook Farm, George spent two years in New York and Concord, Massachusetts to be close to Ralph Waldo Emerson.

== Career ==
George William Curtis in an 1854 portrait by Samuel Laurence. Hand signed by Curtis.

From 1846 to 1850, Curtis travelled through Europe, Egypt and Syria. His travels formed the basis for his first work as an author. He returned in 1850 and settled on Staten Island and began work as a lecturer. He obtained a post on the New-York Tribune and started work on Nile Notes of a Howadji (1851), a journal of his travels on the Nile. He became a favorite in New York City society. He wrote for Putnam's Magazine which he helped George Palmer Putnam to found. He became an associate editor along with Parke Godwin and managing editor Charles Frederick Briggs; the three also collaborated on a gift book called The Homes of American Authors (1853).

Curtis produced a number of volumes, composed of essays written for Putnam's and for Harper's Weekly, which came in rapid succession from his pen. The chief of these were the Potiphar Papers (1853), a satire on the fashionable society of the day; and Prue and I (1856), a pleasantly sentimental, fancifully tender and humorous study of life. In 1855 he married Anna Shaw, daughter of abolitionist Francis Shaw and sister of Robert Gould Shaw of the famed 54th Massachusetts Volunteer Infantry. Not long afterwards he became, through no fault of his own, deeply involved in debt owing to the failure of Putnam's Magazine; and his sense of honour compelled him to spend the greater part of his earnings for many years on discharging the obligations for which he had become responsible, and from which he might have freed himself by legal process. In the period just preceding the Civil War, other interests became subordinate to those of national concern. He was involved in the founding of the Republican Party, and made his first important speech on the questions of the day at Wesleyan University in 1856; he engaged actively in John C. Fremont's presidential campaign of 1856 (the Republican campaign headquarters were located not far from his Staten Island home), and was soon recognized not only as an effective public speaker, but also as one of the ablest, most high-minded, and most trustworthy leaders of public opinion.

In 1862 George William Curtis delivered his "Doctrine of Liberty" address to Phi Beta Kappa society at Harvard, on behalf of President Abraham Lincoln, who was encouraging support for the Emancipation Proclamation. In it, he laid out the intellectual foundations for the purpose of American education that would last another 30 years, and public schools, nearly 100 years.

In 1863 he became the political editor of Harper's Weekly, which was highly influential in shaping public opinion. Curtis's writing was always clear and direct, displaying fairness of mind and good temper. He had high moral standards. From month to month, he contributed to Harper's Magazine, under the title of "The Easy Chair," brief essays on topics of social and literary interest, charming in style, touched with delicate humour and instinct with generous spirit. His service to the Republican party was such, that he was offered several nominations to office, and might have been sent as minister to England; but he refused all such offers, preferring to serve the country as editor and public speaker.

In 1871 he was appointed, by President Ulysses S. Grant, to chair the commission on the reform of the civil service. Its report was the foundation of every effort since made for the purification and regulation of the service and for the destruction of political patronage. From that time Curtis was the leader in this reform, and its progress is mainly due to him. He was president of the National Civil Service Reform League and of the New York Civil Service Reform Association. In 1884 he refused to support James G. Blaine as candidate for the presidency and thus broke with the Republican party, of which he had been a founder and leader. From that time he stood as the typical independent in politics. In 1892, he was elected to the American Philosophical Society. In April of that year, he delivered at Baltimore his eleventh annual address as president of the National Civil Service Reform League, and in May he appeared for the last time in public, to repeat in New York an address on James Russell Lowell, which he had first delivered in Brooklyn on the 22nd of the preceding February, the anniversary of Lowell's birth.

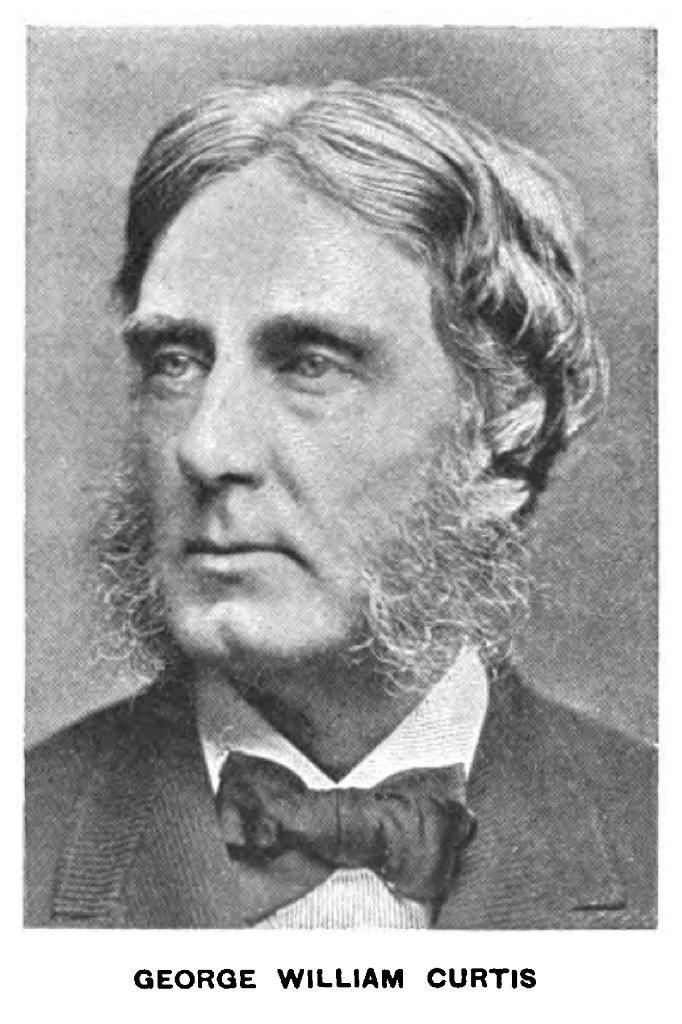
Curtis circa 1890

Curtis was one of the original members of the Board of Education for what would become New York City and advocated educational reforms. He was a member of and frequent speaker at the Unitarian Church on Staten Island (the congregation still meets in the same building). A high school not far from his home is named for him. He is also immortalized with an annual namesake oratorical prize awarded by Columbia College of Columbia University.

== Personal life and family ==
He married Anna Shaw Curtis at the Unitarian Church of the Redeemer in 1856. Curtis, another New England transplant to Staten Island, was a founding member of the Unitarian Church of Staten Island (originally the Unitarian Church of the Redeemer), an author, editor of Putnam's Magazine, and columnist for Harper's Weekly.

The Curtis and Shaw families counted Emerson, Nathaniel Hawthorne and Henry David Thoreau among their close associates.

The Underground Railroad was in use during the 1850s to help runaway slaves, and it is believed that the Curtises and the Shaws were very involved in the Railroad. The Shaw sisters, Anna and Josephine, and their mother, Sarah Sturgis, also spearheaded local efforts to help during the Civil War. George Curtis was targeted by Southern sympathizers, and Anna and her three children left Staten Island temporarily during the New York City draft riots in 1863 for the safety of her grandparents’ home in Roxbury, Massachusetts.

== Works ==
- Notes of a Howadji (1851)
- The Howadji in Syria (1852)
- Lotus-Eating (1852)
- Potiphar Papers (1853)
- The Duty of the American Scholar to Politics and the Times (1856)
- Prue and I (1856)
- Trumps (1862)
- Washington Irving: A Sketch (1891)
- Essays from the Easy Chair (1892)
- Other Essays from the Easy Chair (1893)
- Orations And Addresses (1894)
- Literary and Social Essays (1895)
- Early Letters of George Wm. Curtis to John S. Dwight: Brook Farm and Concord (1898)
- Ars Recte Vivendi (1898)

== See also ==
- Curtis High School on Staten Island is named for him. It was built in 1904.

== Notes ==
Attribution:
