= William Jones (Rhode Island politician) =

American politician

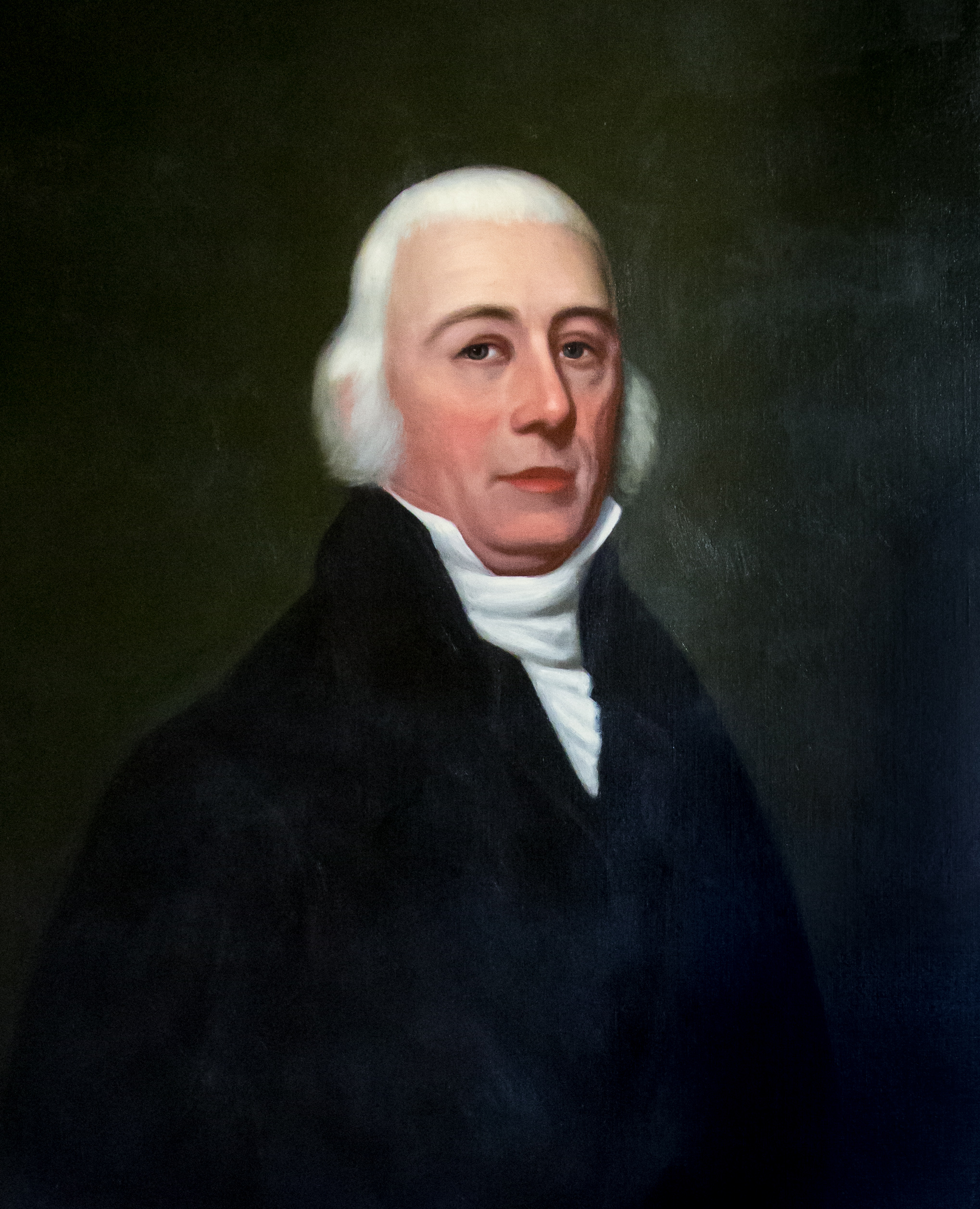

8th Governor of Rhode Island
- In office May 1, 1811 – May 7, 1817
- Lieutenant: Simeon Martin; Jeremiah Thurston
- Preceded by: James Fenner
- Succeeded by: Nehemiah R. Knight

Personal details
- Born: October 8, 1753 Newport, Colony of Rhode Island, British America
- Died: April 9, 1822 (aged 68) Providence, Rhode Island, U.S.
- Resting place: Swan Point Cemetery
- Party: Federalist

Military service
- Allegiance: United States
- Branch/service: Continental Army; United States Marine Corps
- Rank: Captain
- Unit: Babcock's/Lippitt's Regiment; USS Providence
- Battles/wars: Battle of White Plains; Battle of the Assunpink Creek; Battle of Princeton

William Jones (October 8, 1753 – April 9, 1822) was the eighth governor of Rhode Island from 1811 to 1817. He was a Federalist.

== Early life ==
Jones was born in Newport in the Colony of Rhode Island and Providence Plantations, into a family of Welsh origin. His grandfather Thomas Jones (1691–1740) was born in Wales and settled in the Colony of Rhode Island and Providence Plantations. His parents were William and Elizabeth (Pearce) Jones. William was the fourth of five children.

== Military service ==
In January 1776, at age 23, Jones was commissioned as Lieutenant in Babcock's/Lippitt's Regiment, which was raised in Rhode Island. By September he was promoted to captain.

The regiment joined General George Washington's Main Army at Harlem Heights in October, just after the battle; then fought in the Battle of White Plains; the Battle of the Assunpink Creek and the Battle of Princeton. In February 1777 he returned to Rhode Island.

On March 4, 1778, Jones was commissioned as captain of Marines on board the sloop USS Providence. He is credited with originating the phrase "a few good men." On 20 March 1779 in Boston, Capt. Jones advertised for "a few good men" to enlist in the Corps for naval duty. The term seemed ideally suited for Marines, mainly because of the implication that "a few" good men would be enough. This term has survived for over 200 years and has been synonymous with U.S. Marines ever since.

He was captured at the Siege of Charleston in May 1780, was later exchanged, and served until the end of the war. He was probably discharged, along with most of the Continental armed forces, in November 1783.

By right of his service in the Continental Army and Marine Corps, Jones became an Original Member of the Rhode Island Society of the Cincinnati.

After the war, he became a justice of the peace.

== Political career ==
Jones was elected to the Rhode Island General Assembly in 1807. He was Speaker of the Rhode Island State House of Representatives two terms, in 1809–10 and 1810–11. Jones was a Federalist and won the gubernatorial election against incumbent James Fenner in 1811 by just a few hundred votes. Jones opposed the War of 1812, considering the war unjust, and asserted his authority in using the state militia amid concerns about the defense of the coastline. Originally balking at the requirement of sending 500 troops for federal service, he nonetheless relented, and the troops served as part of the 25th Regiment, U.S. Infantry. He was re-elected five times, but having been defeated when seeking a seventh term, he retired from the public life. He was the only Federalist ever to serve as Governor of Rhode Island.

== Personal life ==
On February 28, 1787, Jones was married to Anne Dunn, daughter of Samuel Dunn, of Providence. He had one child, Harriet, who went on to marry Thomas C. Hoppin.

Jones nephew, William Henry Allen, was an American naval officer during the War of 1812.

Jones was the grandfather of Rhode Island governor Elisha Dyer and the great grandfather of governor Elisha Dyer Jr.

Jones was a member of the Beneficent Congregational Church, a fellow of Brown University, president of the Peace Society, and the member of the Rhode Island Bible Society. He was also elected a member of the American Antiquarian Society in 1813.

He was buried at Swan Point Cemetery in Providence, Rhode Island.

Party political offices
Vacant Title last held by Seth Wheaton	Federalist nominee for Governor of Rhode Island; 1811, 1812, 1813, 1814, 1815, 1816, 1817	Succeeded by Elisha Reynolds Potter
Political offices
Preceded by James Fenner	Governor of Rhode Island; 1811–1817	Succeeded by Nehemiah R. Knight
