= Political party strength in Rhode Island =

Politics in the US state of Rhode Island

The following table indicates the party of elected officials in the U.S. state of Rhode Island:

- Governor
- Lieutenant Governor
- Secretary of State
- Attorney General
- Treasurer

The table also indicates the historical party composition in the:

- State Senate
- State House of Representatives
- State delegation to the U.S. Senate
- State delegation to the U.S. House of Representatives

For years in which a presidential election was held, the table indicates which party's candidate received the state's electoral votes.

For a particular year, the noted partisan composition is that which either took office during that year or which maintained the office throughout the entire year. Only changes made outside of regularly scheduled elections are noted as affecting the partisan composition during a particular year. Shading is determined by the final result of any mid-cycle changes in partisan affiliation.

Year	Executive offices					State Legislature		United States Congress				Electoral votes
Year	Governor	Lieutenant Governor	Secretary of State	Attorney General	Treasurer	State Senate	State House	U.S. Senator (Class I)	U.S. Senator (Class II)	U.S. House (District 1)	U.S. House (District 2)	Electoral votes
1775	Nicholas Cooke (I)	William Bradford (F)	Henry Ward	Henry Marchant (I)	Joseph Clarke (AA) (Note: Died in office.)	[?]	[?]	no election				none
1776	Nicholas Cooke (I)	William Bradford (F)	Henry Ward	Henry Marchant (I)	Joseph Clarke (AA)	[?]	[?]	no election				none
1777	Nicholas Cooke (I)	William Bradford (F)	Henry Ward	William Channing (C)	Joseph Clarke (AA)	[?]	[?]	no election				none
1778	William Greene (I)	Jabez Bowen (F)	Henry Ward	William Channing (C)	Joseph Clarke (AA)	[?]	[?]	no election				none
1779	William Greene (I)	Jabez Bowen (F)	Henry Ward	William Channing (C)	Joseph Clarke (AA)	[?]	[?]	no election				none
1780	William Greene (I)	William West (C)	Henry Ward	William Channing (C)	Joseph Clarke (AA)	[?]	[?]	no election				none
1781	William Greene (I)	Jabez Bowen (F)	Henry Ward	William Channing (C)	Joseph Clarke (AA)	[?]	[?]	no election				none
1782	William Greene (I)	Jabez Bowen (F)	Henry Ward	William Channing (C)	Joseph Clarke (AA)	[?]	[?]	no election				none
1783	William Greene (I)	Jabez Bowen (F)	Henry Ward	William Channing (C)	Joseph Clarke (AA)	[?]	[?]	no election				none
1784	William Greene (I)	Jabez Bowen (F)	Henry Ward	William Channing (C)	Joseph Clarke (AA)	[?]	[?]	no election				none
1785	William Greene (I)	Jabez Bowen (F)	Henry Ward	William Channing (C)	Joseph Clarke (AA)	[?]	[?]	no election				none
1786	John Collins (DR)	Daniel Owen (PA)	Henry Ward	William Channing (C)	Joseph Clarke (AA)	[?]	[?]	no election				none
1787	John Collins (DR)	Daniel Owen (PA)	Henry Ward	Henry Goodwin (C)	Joseph Clarke (AA)	[?]	[?]	no election				none
1788	John Collins (DR)	Daniel Owen (PA)	Henry Ward	Henry Goodwin (C)	Joseph Clarke (AA)	[?]	[?]	no election				none
1789	John Collins (DR)	Daniel Owen (PA)	Henry Ward	David Howell (PA)	Joseph Clarke (AA)	[?]	[?]	no election				none
1790	Arthur Fenner (C)	Samuel J. Potter (C)	Henry Ward	Daniel Updike	Joseph Clarke (AA)	[?]	[?]	Theodore Foster (PA)	Joseph Stanton Jr. (AA)	Benjamin Bourne (PA)		none
1791	Arthur Fenner (C)	Samuel J. Potter (C)	Henry Ward	William Channing (C)	Joseph Clarke (AA)	[?]	[?]	Theodore Foster (PA)	Joseph Stanton Jr. (AA)	Benjamin Bourne (PA)		none
1792	Arthur Fenner (C)	Samuel J. Potter (C)	Henry Ward	William Channing (C)	Joseph Clarke (AA)	[?]	[?]	Theodore Foster (PA)	Joseph Stanton Jr. (AA)	Benjamin Bourne (PA)		Washington/ Adams (I) ✓
1793	Arthur Fenner (C)	Samuel J. Potter (C)	Henry Ward	William Channing (C)	Henry Sherburne (F)	[?]	[?]	Theodore Foster (PA)	William Bradford (PA)	Benjamin Bourne (PA)	Francis Malbone (PA)	Washington/ Adams (I) ✓
1794	Arthur Fenner (C)	Samuel J. Potter (C)	Henry Ward	Ray Greene (F)	Henry Sherburne (F)	[?]	[?]	Theodore Foster (PA)	William Bradford (PA)	Benjamin Bourne (PA)	Francis Malbone (PA)	Washington/ Adams (I) ✓
1795	Arthur Fenner (C)	Samuel J. Potter (C)	Henry Ward	Ray Greene (F)	Henry Sherburne (F)	[?]	[?]	Theodore Foster (F)	William Bradford (F)	Benjamin Bourne (F)	Francis Malbone (F)	Washington/ Adams (I) ✓
1796	Arthur Fenner (C)	Samuel J. Potter (C)	Henry Ward	Ray Greene (F)	Henry Sherburne (F)	[?]	[?]	Theodore Foster (F)	William Bradford (F)	Elisha Reynolds Potter (F)	Francis Malbone (F)	Adams/ Pinckney (F) ✓
1797	Arthur Fenner (C)	Samuel J. Potter (C)	Henry Ward	James Burrill Jr. (F)	Henry Sherburne (F)	[?]	[?]	Theodore Foster (F)	Ray Greene (F)	Thomas Tillinghast (F)	Christopher G. Champlin (F)	Adams/ Pinckney (F) ✓
1798	Arthur Fenner (C)	Samuel J. Potter (C)	Samuel Eddy (DR)	James Burrill Jr. (F)	Henry Sherburne (F)	[?]	[?]	Theodore Foster (F)	Ray Greene (F)	Thomas Tillinghast (F)	Christopher G. Champlin (F)	Adams/ Pinckney (F) ✓
1799	Arthur Fenner (C)	George Brown	Samuel Eddy (DR)	James Burrill Jr. (F)	Henry Sherburne (F)	[?]	[?]	Theodore Foster (F)	Ray Greene (F)	John Brown (F)	Christopher G. Champlin (F)	Adams/ Pinckney (F) ✓
1800	Arthur Fenner (C)	Samuel J. Potter (DR)	Samuel Eddy (DR)	James Burrill Jr. (F)	Henry Sherburne (F)	[?]	[?]	Theodore Foster (F)	Ray Greene (F)	John Brown (F)	Christopher G. Champlin (F)	Adams/ Pinckney (F) ✗
1801	Arthur Fenner (C)	Samuel J. Potter (DR)	Samuel Eddy (DR)	James Burrill Jr. (F)	Henry Sherburne (F)	10DR	48DR, 22F	Theodore Foster (F)	Christopher Ellery (DR)	Thomas Tillinghast (DR)	Joseph Stanton Jr. (DR)	Adams/ Pinckney (F) ✗
1802	Arthur Fenner (C)	Samuel J. Potter (DR)	Samuel Eddy (DR)	James Burrill Jr. (F)	Henry Sherburne (F)	DR majority	DR majority	Theodore Foster (F)	Christopher Ellery (DR)	Thomas Tillinghast (DR)	Joseph Stanton Jr. (DR)	Adams/ Pinckney (F) ✗
1803	Arthur Fenner (C)	Paul Mumford (I)	Samuel Eddy (DR)	James Burrill Jr. (F)	Henry Sherburne (F)	DR majority	50DR, 20F	Samuel J. Potter (DR)	Christopher Ellery (DR)	Nehemiah Knight (DR)	Joseph Stanton Jr. (DR)	Adams/ Pinckney (F) ✗
1804	Arthur Fenner (C)	Paul Mumford (I)	Samuel Eddy (DR)	James Burrill Jr. (F)	Henry Sherburne (F)	10DR	54DR, 16F	Benjamin Howland (DR)	Christopher Ellery (DR)	Nehemiah Knight (DR)	Joseph Stanton Jr. (DR)	Jefferson/ G. Clinton (DR) ✓
1805	Henry Smith (C)	Paul Mumford (I)	Samuel Eddy (DR)	James Burrill Jr. (F)	Henry Sherburne (F)	10DR	48DR, 22F	Benjamin Howland (DR)	James Fenner (DR)	Nehemiah Knight (DR)	Joseph Stanton Jr. (DR)	Jefferson/ G. Clinton (DR) ✓
1805	Henry Smith (C)	Paul Mumford (I)	Samuel Eddy (DR)	James Burrill Jr. (F)	Henry Sherburne (F)	10DR	46DR, 24F	Benjamin Howland (DR)	James Fenner (DR)	Nehemiah Knight (DR)	Joseph Stanton Jr. (DR)	Jefferson/ G. Clinton (DR) ✓
1806	Isaac Wilbour (C)	vacant	Samuel Eddy (DR)	James Burrill Jr. (F)	Henry Sherburne (F)	DR majority	54DR, 16F	Benjamin Howland (DR)	James Fenner (DR)	Nehemiah Knight (DR)	Joseph Stanton Jr. (DR)	Jefferson/ G. Clinton (DR) ✓
1806	Isaac Wilbour (C)	vacant	Samuel Eddy (DR)	James Burrill Jr. (F)	Henry Sherburne (F)	DR majority	46DR, 24F	Benjamin Howland (DR)	James Fenner (DR)	Nehemiah Knight (DR)	Joseph Stanton Jr. (DR)	Jefferson/ G. Clinton (DR) ✓
1807	James Fenner (DR)	Constant Taber (DR)	Samuel Eddy (DR)	James Burrill Jr. (F)	Henry Sherburne (F)	F majority (Note: Officially under the Union Party banner.)	F majority	Benjamin Howland (DR)	Elisha Mathewson (DR)	Richard Jackson Jr. (F)	Isaac Wilbour (DR)	Jefferson/ G. Clinton (DR) ✓
1808	James Fenner (DR)	Simeon Martin	Samuel Eddy (DR)	James Burrill Jr. (F)	Constant Taber (DR)	10F	38F, 34DR	Benjamin Howland (DR)	Elisha Mathewson (DR)	Richard Jackson Jr. (F)	Isaac Wilbour (DR)	Pinckney/ King (F) ✗
1808	James Fenner (DR)	Simeon Martin	Samuel Eddy (DR)	James Burrill Jr. (F)	Constant Taber (DR)	10F	40F, 32DR	Benjamin Howland (DR)	Elisha Mathewson (DR)	Richard Jackson Jr. (F)	Isaac Wilbour (DR)	Pinckney/ King (F) ✗
1809	James Fenner (DR)	Simeon Martin	Samuel Eddy (DR)	James Burrill Jr. (F)	Constant Taber (DR)	8F, 2DR	47F, 25DR	Francis Malbone (F)	Elisha Mathewson (DR)	Richard Jackson Jr. (F)	Elisha Reynolds Potter (F)	Pinckney/ King (F) ✗
1809	James Fenner (DR)	Simeon Martin	Samuel Eddy (DR)	James Burrill Jr. (F)	Constant Taber (DR)	8F, 2DR	40F, 32DR	Francis Malbone (F)	Elisha Mathewson (DR)	Richard Jackson Jr. (F)	Elisha Reynolds Potter (F)	Pinckney/ King (F) ✗
1810	James Fenner (DR)	Isaac Wilbour (DR)	Samuel Eddy (DR)	James Burrill Jr. (F)	Constant Taber (DR)	DR majority	38DR, 34F	Christopher G. Champlin (F)	Elisha Mathewson (DR)	Richard Jackson Jr. (F)	Elisha Reynolds Potter (F)	Pinckney/ King (F) ✗
1810	James Fenner (DR)	Isaac Wilbour (DR)	Samuel Eddy (DR)	James Burrill Jr. (F)	Constant Taber (DR)	DR majority	38F, 34DR	Christopher G. Champlin (F)	Elisha Mathewson (DR)	Richard Jackson Jr. (F)	Elisha Reynolds Potter (F)	Pinckney/ King (F) ✗
1811	William Jones (F)	Simeon Martin	Samuel Eddy (DR)	James Burrill Jr. (F)	William Ennis (F)	10F	40F, 32DR	Christopher G. Champlin (F)	Elisha Mathewson (DR)	Richard Jackson Jr. (F)	Elisha Reynolds Potter (F)	Pinckney/ King (F) ✗
1812	William Jones (F)	Simeon Martin	Samuel Eddy (DR)	James Burrill Jr. (F)	William Ennis (F)	10F	40F, 32DR	William Hunter (F)	Jeremiah B. Howell (DR)	Richard Jackson Jr. (F)	Elisha Reynolds Potter (F)	D. Clinton/ Ingersoll (F) ✗
1813	William Jones (F)	Simeon Martin	Samuel Eddy (DR)	James Burrill Jr. (F)	William Ennis (F)	F majority	F majority	William Hunter (F)	Jeremiah B. Howell (DR)	Richard Jackson Jr. (F)	Elisha Reynolds Potter (F)	D. Clinton/ Ingersoll (F) ✗
1814	William Jones (F)	Simeon Martin	Samuel Eddy (DR)	Samuel W. Bridgham (F)	William Ennis (F)	F majority	49F, 23DR	William Hunter (F)	Jeremiah B. Howell (DR)	Richard Jackson Jr. (F)	Elisha Reynolds Potter (F)	D. Clinton/ Ingersoll (F) ✗
1815	William Jones (F)	Simeon Martin	Samuel Eddy (DR)	Samuel W. Bridgham (F)	William Ennis (F)	10F	47F, 25DR	William Hunter (F)	Jeremiah B. Howell (DR)	John Linscom Boss Jr. (F)	James Brown Mason (F)	D. Clinton/ Ingersoll (F) ✗
1816	William Jones (F)	Jeremiah Thurston (F)	Samuel Eddy (DR)	Samuel W. Bridgham (F)	William Ennis (F)	10F	48F, 24DR	William Hunter (F)	Jeremiah B. Howell (DR)	John Linscom Boss Jr. (F)	James Brown Mason (F)	Monroe/ Tompkins (DR) ✓
1817	Nehemiah R. Knight (DR)	Edward Wilcox (DR)	Samuel Eddy (DR)	Henry Bowen (DR)	Thomas G. Pitman (D)	10DR	49F, 23DR	William Hunter (F)	Jeremiah B. Howell (DR)	John Linscom Boss Jr. (F)	James Brown Mason (F)	Monroe/ Tompkins (DR) ✓
1817	Nehemiah R. Knight (DR)	Edward Wilcox (DR)	Samuel Eddy (DR)	Henry Bowen (DR)	Thomas G. Pitman (D)	10DR	39F, 33DR	William Hunter (F)	Jeremiah B. Howell (DR)	John Linscom Boss Jr. (F)	James Brown Mason (F)	Monroe/ Tompkins (DR) ✓
1818	Nehemiah R. Knight (DR)	Edward Wilcox (DR)	Samuel Eddy (DR)	Henry Bowen (DR)	Thomas G. Pitman (D)	10DR	37DR, 35F	William Hunter (F)	James Burrill Jr. (F)	John Linscom Boss Jr. (F)	James Brown Mason (F)	Monroe/ Tompkins (DR) ✓
1819	Nehemiah R. Knight (DR)	Edward Wilcox (DR)	Henry Bowen (W)	Dutee J. Pearce (DR)	Thomas G. Pitman (D)	10DR	40DR, 32F	William Hunter (F)	James Burrill Jr. (F)	Samuel Eddy (DR)	Nathaniel Hazard (DR)	Monroe/ Tompkins (DR) ✓
1820	Nehemiah R. Knight (DR)	Edward Wilcox (DR)	Henry Bowen (W)	Dutee J. Pearce (DR)	Thomas G. Pitman (D)	DR majority	48DR, 24F	William Hunter (F)	James Burrill Jr. (F)	Samuel Eddy (DR)	Nathaniel Hazard (DR)	Monroe/ Tompkins (DR) ✓
1821	William C. Gibbs (DR)	Caleb Earle (DR)	Henry Bowen (W)	Dutee J. Pearce (DR)	Thomas G. Pitman (D)	DR majority	DR majority	James DeWolf (DR)	Nehemiah R. Knight (DR)	Samuel Eddy (DR)	Job Durfee (DR)	Monroe/ Tompkins (DR) ✓
1821	William C. Gibbs (DR)	Caleb Earle (DR)	Henry Bowen (W)	Dutee J. Pearce (DR)	Thomas G. Pitman (D)	DR majority	F majority	James DeWolf (DR)	Nehemiah R. Knight (DR)	Samuel Eddy (DR)	Job Durfee (DR)	Monroe/ Tompkins (DR) ✓
1822	William C. Gibbs (DR)	Caleb Earle (DR)	Henry Bowen (W)	Dutee J. Pearce (DR)	Thomas G. Pitman (D)	DR majority	36DR, 36F (Note: A Democratic-Republican, Elisha Mathewson, was elected Speaker.)	James DeWolf (DR)	Nehemiah R. Knight (DR)	Samuel Eddy (DR)	Job Durfee (DR)	Monroe/ Tompkins (DR) ✓
1822	William C. Gibbs (DR)	Caleb Earle (DR)	Henry Bowen (W)	Dutee J. Pearce (DR)	Thomas G. Pitman (D)	DR majority	F majority	James DeWolf (DR)	Nehemiah R. Knight (DR)	Samuel Eddy (DR)	Job Durfee (DR)	Monroe/ Tompkins (DR) ✓
1823	William C. Gibbs (DR)	Caleb Earle (DR)	Henry Bowen (W)	Dutee J. Pearce (DR)	Thomas G. Pitman (D)	DR majority	F majority	James DeWolf (DR)	Nehemiah R. Knight (DR)	Samuel Eddy (DR)	Job Durfee (DR)	Monroe/ Tompkins (DR) ✓
1824	James Fenner (DR)	Charles Collins (DR)	Henry Bowen (W)	Dutee J. Pearce (DR)	Thomas G. Pitman (D)	NR majority	NR majority	James DeWolf (DR)	Nehemiah R. Knight (DR)	Samuel Eddy (DR)	Job Durfee (DR)	Adams/ Calhoun (DR) ✓
1825	James Fenner (DR)	Charles Collins (DR)	Henry Bowen (W)	Albert C. Greene (W)	Thomas G. Pitman (D)	NR majority	NR majority	James DeWolf (NR)	Nehemiah R. Knight (NR)	Tristam Burges (NR)	Dutee J. Pearce (NR)	Adams/ Calhoun (DR) ✓
1825	James Fenner (DR)	Charles Collins (DR)	Henry Bowen (W)	Albert C. Greene (W)	Thomas G. Pitman (D)	NR majority	NR majority	Asher Robbins (NR)	Nehemiah R. Knight (NR)	Tristam Burges (NR)	Dutee J. Pearce (NR)	Adams/ Calhoun (DR) ✓
1826	James Fenner (DR)	Charles Collins (DR)	Henry Bowen (W)	Albert C. Greene (W)	Thomas G. Pitman (D)	NR majority	NR majority	Asher Robbins (NR)	Nehemiah R. Knight (NR)	Tristam Burges (NR)	Dutee J. Pearce (NR)	Adams/ Calhoun (DR) ✓
1827	James Fenner (DR)	Charles Collins (DR)	Henry Bowen (W)	Albert C. Greene (W)	Thomas G. Pitman (D)	NR majority	NR majority	Asher Robbins (NR)	Nehemiah R. Knight (NR)	Tristam Burges (NR)	Dutee J. Pearce (NR)	Adams/ Calhoun (DR) ✓
1828	James Fenner (DR)	Charles Collins (DR)	Henry Bowen (W)	Albert C. Greene (W)	Thomas G. Pitman (D)	NR majority	NR majority	Asher Robbins (NR)	Nehemiah R. Knight (NR)	Tristam Burges (NR)	Dutee J. Pearce (NR)	Adams/ Rush (NR) ✗
1829	James Fenner (DR)	Charles Collins (DR)	Henry Bowen (W)	Albert C. Greene (W)	Thomas G. Pitman (D)	NR majority	NR majority	Asher Robbins (NR)	Nehemiah R. Knight (NR)	Tristam Burges (NR)	Dutee J. Pearce (NR)	Adams/ Rush (NR) ✗
1830	James Fenner (DR)	Charles Collins (DR)	Henry Bowen (W)	Albert C. Greene (W)	Thomas G. Pitman (D)	NR majority	NR majority	Asher Robbins (NR)	Nehemiah R. Knight (NR)	Tristam Burges (NR)	Dutee J. Pearce (NR)	Adams/ Rush (NR) ✗
1831	Lemuel H. Arnold (W)	Charles Collins (DR)	Henry Bowen (W)	Albert C. Greene (W)	Thomas G. Pitman (D)	10NR	44NR, 26J, 2?	Asher Robbins (NR)	Nehemiah R. Knight (NR)	Tristam Burges (NR)	Dutee J. Pearce (NR)	Adams/ Rush (NR) ✗
1832	Lemuel H. Arnold (W)	Charles Collins (DR)	Henry Bowen (W)	Albert C. Greene (W)	Thomas G. Pitman (D)	6NR, 4 vac.	NR majority	Asher Robbins (NR)	Nehemiah R. Knight (NR)	Tristam Burges (NR)	Dutee J. Pearce (NR)	Clay/ Sergeant (NR) ✗
1832	Lemuel H. Arnold (W)	Charles Collins (DR)	Henry Bowen (W)	Albert C. Greene (W)	Thomas G. Pitman (D)	6NR, 4 vac.	A-M/D coalition	Asher Robbins (NR)	Nehemiah R. Knight (NR)	Tristam Burges (NR)	Dutee J. Pearce (NR)	Clay/ Sergeant (NR) ✗
1833	John Brown Francis (D)	Jeffrey Hazard (D)	Henry Bowen (W)	Albert C. Greene (W)	Thomas G. Pitman (D)	8D, 2NR	A-M/D coalition (Note: A coalition of Democrats, Anti-Masons, and some Whigs, led by Anti-Mason William Sprague III, gained control of the House in the August elections, and held them through 1834.)	Asher Robbins (NR)	Nehemiah R. Knight (NR)	Tristam Burges (NR)	Dutee J. Pearce (A-M)	Clay/ Sergeant (NR) ✗
1834	John Brown Francis (D)	Jeffrey Hazard (D)	Henry Bowen (W)	Albert C. Greene (W)	Thomas G. Pitman (D)	8D, 1W, 1 vac.	39W, 28D, 1A-M, 4?	Asher Robbins (NR)	Nehemiah R. Knight (NR)	Tristam Burges (NR)	Dutee J. Pearce (A-M)	Clay/ Sergeant (NR) ✗
1834	John Brown Francis (D)	Jeffrey Hazard (D)	Henry Bowen (W)	Albert C. Greene (W)	Thomas G. Pitman (D)	8D, 1W, 1 vac.	39W, 20D, 5A-M, 8?	Asher Robbins (NR)	Nehemiah R. Knight (NR)	Tristam Burges (NR)	Dutee J. Pearce (A-M)	Clay/ Sergeant (NR) ✗
1835	John Brown Francis (D)	George Engs (W)	Henry Bowen (W)	Albert C. Greene (W)	Thomas G. Pitman (D)	4W, 4D, 2 vac.	37W, 35D	Asher Robbins (NR)	Nehemiah R. Knight (NR)	William Sprague III (A-M)	Dutee J. Pearce (A-M)	Clay/ Sergeant (NR) ✗
1836	John Brown Francis (D)	Jeffrey Hazard (D)	Henry Bowen (W)	Albert C. Greene (W)	Thomas G. Pitman (D)	10D	33W, 31D, 8?	Asher Robbins (NR)	Nehemiah R. Knight (NR)	William Sprague III (A-M)	Dutee J. Pearce (A-M)	Van Buren/ Johnson (D) ✓
1836	John Brown Francis (D)	Jeffrey Hazard (D)	Henry Bowen (W)	Albert C. Greene (W)	Thomas G. Pitman (D)	10D	40D, 32W	Asher Robbins (NR)	Nehemiah R. Knight (NR)	William Sprague III (A-M)	Dutee J. Pearce (A-M)	Van Buren/ Johnson (D) ✓
1837	John Brown Francis (D)	Benjamin B. Thurston (D)	Henry Bowen (W)	Albert C. Greene (W)	Thomas G. Pitman (D)	10D	D majority	Asher Robbins (W)	Nehemiah R. Knight (W)	Robert B. Cranston (W)	Joseph L. Tillinghast (W)	Van Buren/ Johnson (D) ✓
1837	John Brown Francis (D)	Benjamin B. Thurston (D)	Henry Bowen (W)	Albert C. Greene (W)	Thomas G. Pitman (D)	10D	W majority	Asher Robbins (W)	Nehemiah R. Knight (W)	Robert B. Cranston (W)	Joseph L. Tillinghast (W)	Van Buren/ Johnson (D) ✓
1838	William Sprague III (D)	Joseph Childs (W)	Henry Bowen (W)	Albert C. Greene (W)	Thomas G. Pitman (D)	10W	44W, 28D	Asher Robbins (W)	Nehemiah R. Knight (W)	Robert B. Cranston (W)	Joseph L. Tillinghast (W)	Van Buren/ Johnson (D) ✓
1838	William Sprague III (D)	Joseph Childs (W)	Henry Bowen (W)	Albert C. Greene (W)	Thomas G. Pitman (D)	10W	45W, 27D	Asher Robbins (W)	Nehemiah R. Knight (W)	Robert B. Cranston (W)	Joseph L. Tillinghast (W)	Van Buren/ Johnson (D) ✓
1839	Samuel Ward King (LO)	Joseph Childs (W)	Henry Bowen (W)	Albert C. Greene (W)	John Sterne (W)	10W	40W, 32D	Nathan F. Dixon I (W)	Nehemiah R. Knight (W)	Robert B. Cranston (W)	Joseph L. Tillinghast (W)	Van Buren/ Johnson (D) ✓
1839	Samuel Ward King (LO)	Joseph Childs (W)	Henry Bowen (W)	Albert C. Greene (W)	John Sterne (W)	10W	45W, 26D, 1?	Nathan F. Dixon I (W)	Nehemiah R. Knight (W)	Robert B. Cranston (W)	Joseph L. Tillinghast (W)	Van Buren/ Johnson (D) ✓
1840	Samuel Ward King (LO)	Byron Diman (LO)	Henry Bowen (W)	Albert C. Greene (W)	Stephen Cahoone (LO)	10W	52W, 20D	Nathan F. Dixon I (W)	Nehemiah R. Knight (W)	Robert B. Cranston (W)	Joseph L. Tillinghast (W)	Harrison/ Tyler (W) ✓
1840	Samuel Ward King (LO)	Byron Diman (LO)	Henry Bowen (W)	Albert C. Greene (W)	Stephen Cahoone (LO)	10W	48W, 24D	Nathan F. Dixon I (W)	Nehemiah R. Knight (W)	Robert B. Cranston (W)	Joseph L. Tillinghast (W)	Harrison/ Tyler (W) ✓
1841	Samuel Ward King (LO)	Byron Diman (LO)	Henry Bowen (W)	Albert C. Greene (W)	Stephen Cahoone (LO)	10W	55W, 17D	Nathan F. Dixon I (W)	James F. Simmons (W)	Robert B. Cranston (W)	Joseph L. Tillinghast (W)	Harrison/ Tyler (W) ✓
1842	Thomas Wilson Dorr (Reb) (Note: Extralegal, as part of the Dorr Rebellion. Term was concurrent with latter part of that of Samuel Ward King.)	Nathaniel Bullock (D)	Henry Bowen (W)	Albert C. Greene (W)	Stephen Cahoone (LO)	10LO	62LO, 10D (Note: The Law and Order Party maintained their majority in the August elections.)	Nathan F. Dixon I (W)	James F. Simmons (W)	Robert B. Cranston (W)	Joseph L. Tillinghast (W)	Harrison/ Tyler (W) ✓
1843	James Fenner (LO)	Byron Diman (LO)	Henry Bowen (W)	Joseph Blake (LO)	Stephen Cahoone (LO)	24LO, 7D	50W, 19D (Note: The Constitution of 1843 established annual House elections in April, eliminating the elections previously held in August.)	William Sprague III (W)	James F. Simmons (W)	Henry Y. Cranston (LO)	Elisha R. Potter (LO)	Harrison/ Tyler (W) ✓
1844	James Fenner (LO)	Byron Diman (LO)	Henry Bowen (W)	Joseph Blake (LO)	Stephen Cahoone (LO)	24W, 7D	56W, 13D	William Sprague III (W)	James F. Simmons (W)	Henry Y. Cranston (LO)	Elisha R. Potter (LO)	Clay/ Frelinghuysen (W) ✗
1845	Charles Jackson (W/Lib)	Byron Diman (LO)	Henry Bowen (W)	Joseph Blake (LO)	Stephen Cahoone (LO)	21W, 10D	42W, 27D	John Brown Francis (LO)	James F. Simmons (W)	Henry Y. Cranston (W)	Lemuel H. Arnold (W)	Clay/ Frelinghuysen (W) ✗
1846	Byron Diman (LO)	Elisha Harris (W)	Henry Bowen (W)	Joseph Blake (LO)	Stephen Cahoone (LO)	20W, 11Lib (Note: The Democrats in the 1846 election ran as the Liberation Party, which supported amnesty for those convicted for participating in the Dorr Rebellion.)	44W, 25Lib	Albert C. Greene (W)	James F. Simmons (W)	Henry Y. Cranston (W)	Lemuel H. Arnold (W)	Clay/ Frelinghuysen (W) ✗
1847	Elisha Harris (W)	Edward W. Lawton (W)	Henry Bowen (W)	Joseph Blake (LO)	Stephen Cahoone (LO)	22W, 7D, 2 vac.	48W, 20D, 1?	Albert C. Greene (W)	John Hopkins Clarke (W)	Robert B. Cranston (W)	Benjamin B. Thurston (D)	Clay/ Frelinghuysen (W) ✗
1848	Elisha Harris (W)	Edward W. Lawton (W)	Henry Bowen (W)	Joseph Blake (LO)	Stephen Cahoone (LO)	20W, 11D	43W, 26D	Albert C. Greene (W)	John Hopkins Clarke (W)	Robert B. Cranston (W)	Benjamin B. Thurston (D)	Taylor/ Fillmore (W) ✓
1849	Henry B. Anthony (W)	Thomas Whipple (W)	Christopher E. Robbins (W)	Joseph Blake (LO)	Stephen Cahoone (LO)	19W, 11D, 1FS	43W, 23D, 1FS, 2 vac.	Albert C. Greene (W)	John Hopkins Clarke (W)	George Gordon King (W)	Nathan F. Dixon II (W)	Taylor/ Fillmore (W) ✓
1850	Henry B. Anthony (W)	Thomas Whipple (W)	Christopher E. Robbins (W)	Joseph Blake (LO)	Stephen Cahoone (LO)	19W, 12D	45W, 24D	Albert C. Greene (W)	John Hopkins Clarke (W)	George Gordon King (W)	Nathan F. Dixon II (W)	Taylor/ Fillmore (W) ✓
1851	Philip Allen (D) (Note: Resigned on July 20, 1853, to become a U.S. Senator, and replaced by Lt. Gov. Dimond until the end of the term.)	William Beach Lawrence (D)	Asa Potter (D)	Walter S. Burges (D)	Edwin Wilbur (D)	17D, 14W	37W, 35D	Charles Tillinghast James (D)	John Hopkins Clarke (W)	George Gordon King (W)	Benjamin B. Thurston (D)	Taylor/ Fillmore (W) ✓
1852	Philip Allen (D)	Samuel G. Arnold (D)	Asa Potter (D)	Walter S. Burges (D)	Edwin Wilbur (D)	17W, 14D	40W, 30D	Charles Tillinghast James (D)	John Hopkins Clarke (W)	George Gordon King (W)	Benjamin B. Thurston (D)	Pierce/ King (D) ✓
1853	Philip Allen (D)	Francis M. Dimond (D)	Asa Potter (D)	Walter S. Burges (D)	Edwin Wilbur (D)	17D, 14W	46D, 26W	Charles Tillinghast James (D)	Philip Allen (D)	Thomas Davis (D)	Benjamin B. Thurston (D)	Pierce/ King (D) ✓
1854	William W. Hoppin (W)	John J. Reynolds (W)	William R. Watson (W)	Christopher Robinson (W)	Samuel B. Vernon (W)	18W, 13D	41W, 31D	Charles Tillinghast James (D)	Philip Allen (D)	Thomas Davis (D)	Benjamin B. Thurston (D)	Pierce/ King (D) ✓
1855	William W. Hoppin (W)	Anderson C. Rose (KN)	John Russell Bartlett (R)	Charles Hart (R)	Samuel A. Parker (R)	29KN, 2D	69KN, 3D	Charles Tillinghast James (D)	Philip Allen (D)	Nathan B. Durfee (KN)	Benjamin B. Thurston (KN)	Pierce/ King (D) ✓
1856	William W. Hoppin (W)	Nicholas Brown III (KN)	John Russell Bartlett (R)	Charles Hart (R)	Samuel A. Parker (R)	23R, 8D	55R, 17D	Charles Tillinghast James (D)	Philip Allen (D)	Nathan B. Durfee (KN)	Benjamin B. Thurston (KN)	Frémont/ Dayton (R) ✗
1857	Elisha Dyer (R)	Thomas Turner (R)	John Russell Bartlett (R)	Charles Hart (R)	Samuel A. Parker (R)	29R, 3D	65R, 7D	James F. Simmons (R)	Philip Allen (D)	Nathan B. Durfee (R)	William D. Brayton (R)	Frémont/ Dayton (R) ✗
1858	Elisha Dyer (R)	Thomas Turner (R)	John Russell Bartlett (R)	Jerome Kimball (R)	Samuel A. Parker (R)	30R, 2D	67R, 4D, 1?	James F. Simmons (R)	Philip Allen (D)	Nathan B. Durfee (R)	William D. Brayton (R)	Frémont/ Dayton (R) ✗
1859	Thomas G. Turner (R)	Isaac Saunders (KN)	John Russell Bartlett (R)	Jerome Kimball (R)	Samuel A. Parker (R)	27R, 5D	62R, 9D, 1?	James F. Simmons (R)	Henry B. Anthony (R)	Christopher Robinson (R)	William D. Brayton (R)	Frémont/ Dayton (R) ✗
1860	William Sprague IV (CU)	J. Russell Bullock (CU)	John Russell Bartlett (R)	Walter S. Burges (D)	Samuel A. Parker (R)	17R, 15CU	42CU, 29R, 1?	James F. Simmons (R)	Henry B. Anthony (R)	Christopher Robinson (R)	William D. Brayton (R)	Lincoln/ Hamlin (R) ✓
1861	William Sprague IV (CU)	Samuel G. Arnold (U)	John Russell Bartlett (R)	Walter S. Burges (D)	Samuel A. Parker (R)	18CU, 14R	47CU, 25R	James F. Simmons (R)	Henry B. Anthony (R)	William Paine Sheffield Sr. (CU)	George H. Browne (CU)	Lincoln/ Hamlin (R) ✓
1862	William Sprague IV (CU)	Samuel G. Arnold (U)	John Russell Bartlett (R)	Walter S. Burges (D)	Samuel A. Parker (R)	19CU, 12R, 1?	47CU, 25R	James F. Simmons (R)	Henry B. Anthony (R)	William Paine Sheffield Sr. (CU)	George H. Browne (CU)	Lincoln/ Hamlin (R) ✓
1863	William C. Cozzens (D)	Seth Padelford (R)	John Russell Bartlett (R)	Abraham Payne (R)	Samuel A. Parker (R)	22R, 11U	50CU, 22R	Samuel G. Arnold (R)	Henry B. Anthony (R)	Thomas Jenckes (R)	Nathan F. Dixon II (R)	Lincoln/ Hamlin (R) ✓
1864	James Y. Smith (R)	Seth Padelford (R)	John Russell Bartlett (R)	Horatio Rogers Jr. (R)	Samuel A. Parker (R)	21R, 12D	54R, 18D	William Sprague IV (R)	Henry B. Anthony (R)	Thomas Jenckes (R)	Nathan F. Dixon II (R)	Lincoln/ Johnson (NU) ✓
1865	James Y. Smith (R)	Duncan Pell (D)	John Russell Bartlett (R)	Horatio Rogers Jr. (R)	Samuel A. Parker (R)	23R, 9D, 1?	54R, 18D	William Sprague IV (R)	Henry B. Anthony (R)	Thomas Jenckes (R)	Nathan F. Dixon II (R)	Lincoln/ Johnson (NU) ✓
1866	Ambrose Burnside (R)	William Greene (R)	John Russell Bartlett (R)	Horatio Rogers Jr. (R)	George W. Tew (R)	28R, 5D	65R, 7D	William Sprague IV (R)	Henry B. Anthony (R)	Thomas Jenckes (R)	Nathan F. Dixon II (R)	Lincoln/ Johnson (NU) ✓
1867	Ambrose Burnside (R)	William Greene (R)	John Russell Bartlett (R)	Willard Sayles (R)	George W. Tew (R)	28R, 6D	65R, 7D	William Sprague IV (R)	Henry B. Anthony (R)	Thomas Jenckes (R)	Nathan F. Dixon II (R)	Lincoln/ Johnson (NU) ✓
1868	Ambrose Burnside (R)	Pardon Stevens	John Russell Bartlett (R)	Willard Sayles (R)	Samuel A. Parker (R)	29R, 5D	65R, 7D	William Sprague IV (R)	Henry B. Anthony (R)	Thomas Jenckes (R)	Nathan F. Dixon II (R)	Grant/ Colfax (R) ✓
1869	Seth Padelford (R)	Pardon Stevens	John Russell Bartlett (R)	Willard Sayles (R)	Samuel A. Parker (R)	27R, 6D, 1?	61R, 11D	William Sprague IV (R)	Henry B. Anthony (R)	Thomas Jenckes (R)	Nathan F. Dixon II (R)	Grant/ Colfax (R) ✓
1870	Seth Padelford (R)	Pardon Stevens	John Russell Bartlett (R)	Willard Sayles (R)	Samuel A. Parker (R)	25R, 9D	54R, 18D	William Sprague IV (R)	Henry B. Anthony (R)	Thomas Jenckes (R)	Nathan F. Dixon II (R)	Grant/ Colfax (R) ✓
1871	Seth Padelford (R)	Pardon Stevens	John Russell Bartlett (R)	Willard Sayles (R)	Samuel A. Parker (R)	27R, 9D	55R, 17D	William Sprague IV (R)	Henry B. Anthony (R)	Benjamin T. Eames (R)	James M. Pendleton (R)	Grant/ Colfax (R) ✓
1872	Seth Padelford (R)	Charles Cutler (D)	Joshua M. Addeman (R)	Willard Sayles (R)	Samuel Clark (R)	26R, 10D	56R, 16D	William Sprague IV (R)	Henry B. Anthony (R)	Benjamin T. Eames (R)	James M. Pendleton (R)	Grant/ Wilson (R) ✓
1873	Henry Howard (R)	Charles C. Van Zandt (R)	Joshua M. Addeman (R)	Willard Sayles (R)	Samuel Clark (R)	25R, 11D	56R, 16D	William Sprague IV (R)	Henry B. Anthony (R)	Benjamin T. Eames (R)	James M. Pendleton (R)	Grant/ Wilson (R) ✓
1874	Henry Howard (R)	Charles C. Van Zandt (R)	Joshua M. Addeman (R)	Willard Sayles (R)	Samuel Clark (R)	28R, 8D	55R, 17D	William Sprague IV (R)	Henry B. Anthony (R)	Benjamin T. Eames (R)	James M. Pendleton (R)	Grant/ Wilson (R) ✓
1875	Henry Lippitt (R)	Henry Tillinghast Sisson (R)	Joshua M. Addeman (R)	Willard Sayles (R)	Samuel Clark (R)	26R, 10D	59R, 13D	Ambrose Burnside (R)	Henry B. Anthony (R)	Benjamin T. Eames (R)	Latimer W. Ballou (R)	Grant/ Wilson (R) ✓
1876	Henry Lippitt (R)	Henry Tillinghast Sisson (R)	Joshua M. Addeman (R)	Willard Sayles (R)	Samuel Clark (R)	26R, 10D	62R, 10D	Ambrose Burnside (R)	Henry B. Anthony (R)	Benjamin T. Eames (R)	Latimer W. Ballou (R)	Hayes/ Wheeler (R) ✓
1877	Charles C. Van Zandt (R)	Albert Howard (Proh)	Joshua M. Addeman (R)	Willard Sayles (R)	Samuel Clark (R)	28R, 8D	54R, 18D	Ambrose Burnside (R)	Henry B. Anthony (R)	Benjamin T. Eames (R)	Latimer W. Ballou (R)	Hayes/ Wheeler (R) ✓
1878	Charles C. Van Zandt (R)	Albert Howard (Proh)	Joshua M. Addeman (R)	Willard Sayles (R)	Samuel Clark (R)	25R, 11D	55R, 17D	Ambrose Burnside (R)	Henry B. Anthony (R)	Benjamin T. Eames (R)	Latimer W. Ballou (R)	Hayes/ Wheeler (R) ✓
1879	Charles C. Van Zandt (R)	Albert Howard (Proh)	Joshua M. Addeman (R)	Willard Sayles (R)	Samuel Clark (R)	28R, 8D	54R, 18D	Ambrose Burnside (R)	Henry B. Anthony (R)	Nelson W. Aldrich (R)	Latimer W. Ballou (R)	Hayes/ Wheeler (R) ✓
1880	Alfred H. Littlefield (R)	Henry Fay (R)	Joshua M. Addeman (R)	Willard Sayles (R)	Samuel Clark (R)	27R, 9D	60R, 12D	Ambrose Burnside (R)	Henry B. Anthony (R)	Nelson W. Aldrich (R)	Latimer W. Ballou (R)	Garfield/ Arthur (R) ✓
1881	Alfred H. Littlefield (R)	Henry Fay (R)	Joshua M. Addeman (R)	Willard Sayles (R)	Samuel Clark (R)	28R, 8D	64R, 8D	Nelson W. Aldrich (R)	Henry B. Anthony (R)	Nelson W. Aldrich (R)	Jonathan Chace (R)	Garfield/ Arthur (R) ✓
1882	Alfred H. Littlefield (R)	Henry Fay (R)	Joshua M. Addeman (R)	Samuel P. Colt (R)	Samuel Clark (R)	34R, 3D	65R, 7D	Nelson W. Aldrich (R)	Henry B. Anthony (R)	Henry J. Spooner (R)	Jonathan Chace (R)	Garfield/ Arthur (R) ✓
1883	Augustus O. Bourn (R)	Oscar Rathbun (R)	Joshua M. Addeman (R)	Samuel P. Colt (R)	Samuel Clark (R)	34R, 3D	55R, 17D	Nelson W. Aldrich (R)	Henry B. Anthony (R)	Henry J. Spooner (R)	Jonathan Chace (R)	Garfield/ Arthur (R) ✓
1884	Augustus O. Bourn (R)	Oscar Rathbun (R)	Joshua M. Addeman (R)	Samuel P. Colt (R)	Samuel Clark (R)	28R, 8D	57R, 15D	Nelson W. Aldrich (R)	William Paine Sheffield Sr. (R)	Henry J. Spooner (R)	Jonathan Chace (R)	Blaine/ Logan (R) ✗
1885	George P. Wetmore (R)	Lucius B. Darling (R)	Joshua M. Addeman (R)	Samuel P. Colt (R)	Samuel Clark (R)	29R, 7D	64R, 7D, 1Proh	Nelson W. Aldrich (R)	Jonathan Chace (R)	Henry J. Spooner (R)	Nathan F. Dixon III (R)	Blaine/ Logan (R) ✗
1886	George P. Wetmore (R)	Lucius B. Darling (R)	Joshua M. Addeman (R)	Edwin Metcalf (Proh)	Samuel Clark (R)	29R, 6D, 1Proh	65R, 6D, 1Proh	Nelson W. Aldrich (R)	Jonathan Chace (R)	Henry J. Spooner (R)	William A. Pirce (R)	Blaine/ Logan (R) ✗
1887	John W. Davis (D)	Samuel R. Honey (D)	Edwin D. McGuinness (D)	Ziba O. Slocum (D)	John G. Perry (D)	20R, 16D	40D, 30R, 2Proh	Nelson W. Aldrich (R)	Jonathan Chace (R)	Henry J. Spooner (R)	Charles H. Page (D)	Blaine/ Logan (R) ✗
1888	Royal C. Taft (R)	Enos Lapham (R)	Samuel H. Cross	Horatio Rogers Jr. (R)	Samuel Clark (R)	31R, 5D	60R, 11D, 1Proh	Nelson W. Aldrich (R)	Jonathan Chace (R)	Henry J. Spooner (R)	Warren O. Arnold (R)	Harrison/ Morton (R) ✓
1889	Herbert W. Ladd (R)	Daniel Littlefield (R)	Samuel H. Cross	Ziba O. Slocum (D)	Samuel Clark (R)	25R, 11D	39D, 33R	Nelson W. Aldrich (R)	Nathan F. Dixon III (R)	Henry J. Spooner (R)	Warren O. Arnold (R)	Harrison/ Morton (R) ✓
1890	John W. Davis (D)	William Wardwell (D)	Edwin D. McGuinness (D)	Ziba O. Slocum (D)	John G. Perry (D)	23R, 13D	43D, 29R	Nelson W. Aldrich (R)	Nathan F. Dixon III (R)	Henry J. Spooner (R)	Warren O. Arnold (R)	Harrison/ Morton (R) ✓
1891	Herbert W. Ladd (R)	Henry A. Stearns (R)	George H. Utter (R)	Robert W. Burbank (R)	Samuel Clark (R)	27R, 9D	51R, 21D	Nelson W. Aldrich (R)	Nathan F. Dixon III (R)	Oscar Lapham (D)	Warren O. Arnold (R)	Harrison/ Morton (R) ✓
1892	Daniel Russell Brown (R)	Melville Bull (R)	George H. Utter (R)	Robert W. Burbank (R)	Samuel Clark (R)	27R, 9D	43R, 29D	Nelson W. Aldrich (R)	Nathan F. Dixon III (R)	Oscar Lapham (D)	Charles H. Page (D)	Harrison/ Reid (R) ✗
1893	Daniel Russell Brown (R)	Melville Bull (R)	George H. Utter (R)	Robert W. Burbank (R)	Samuel Clark (R)	22R, 14D	40D, 32R	Nelson W. Aldrich (R)	Nathan F. Dixon III (R)	Oscar Lapham (D)	Charles H. Page (D)	Harrison/ Reid (R) ✗
1894	Daniel Russell Brown (R)	Edwin Allen (R)	Charles P. Bennett (R)	Edward C. Dubois (R)	Samuel Clark (R)	34R, 2D	69R, 3D	Nelson W. Aldrich (R)	Nathan F. Dixon III (R)	Oscar Lapham (D)	Warren O. Arnold (R)	Harrison/ Reid (R) ✗
1895	Charles W. Lippitt (R)	Edwin Allen (R)	Charles P. Bennett (R)	Edward C. Dubois (R)	Samuel Clark (R)	34R, 3D	66R, 6D	Nelson W. Aldrich (R)	George P. Wetmore (R)	Melville Bull (R)	Warren O. Arnold (R)	Harrison/ Reid (R) ✗
1896	Charles W. Lippitt (R)	Edwin Allen (R)	Charles P. Bennett (R)	Edward C. Dubois (R)	Samuel Clark (R)	35R, 2D	68R, 4D	Nelson W. Aldrich (R)	George P. Wetmore (R)	Melville Bull (R)	Warren O. Arnold (R)	McKinley/ Hobart (R) ✓
1897	Elisha Dyer Jr. (R)	Aram J. Pothier (R)	Charles P. Bennett (R)	Willard B. Tanner (R)	Samuel Clark (R)	33R, 4D	53R, 19D	Nelson W. Aldrich (R)	George P. Wetmore (R)	Melville Bull (R)	Warren O. Arnold (R)	McKinley/ Hobart (R) ✓
1898	Elisha Dyer Jr. (R)	William Gregory (R)	Charles P. Bennett (R)	Willard B. Tanner (R)	Clinton D. Sellew (R)	33R, 4D	65R, 7D	Nelson W. Aldrich (R)	George P. Wetmore (R)	Melville Bull (R)	Adin B. Capron (R)	McKinley/ Hobart (R) ✓
1898	Elisha Dyer Jr. (R)	William Gregory (R)	Charles P. Bennett (R)	Willard B. Tanner (R)	Walter A. Read (R)	33R, 4D	65R, 7D	Nelson W. Aldrich (R)	George P. Wetmore (R)	Melville Bull (R)	Adin B. Capron (R)	McKinley/ Hobart (R) ✓
1899	Elisha Dyer Jr. (R)	William Gregory (R)	Charles P. Bennett (R)	Willard B. Tanner (R)	Walter A. Read (R)	31R, 6D	58R, 13D, 1Proh	Nelson W. Aldrich (R)	George P. Wetmore (R)	Melville Bull (R)	Adin B. Capron (R)	McKinley/ Hobart (R) ✓
1900	William Gregory (R)	Charles D. Kimball (R)	Charles P. Bennett (R)	Willard B. Tanner (R)	Walter A. Read (R)	34R, 3D (Note: An Amendment to the Rhode Island Constitution moved elections from April to November, so the Legislature elected in April 1900 served what became essentially a two-year term.)	60R, 12D	Nelson W. Aldrich (R)	George P. Wetmore (R)	Melville Bull (R)	Adin B. Capron (R)	McKinley/ Roosevelt (R) ✓
1901	William Gregory (R)	Charles D. Kimball (R)	Charles P. Bennett (R)	Willard B. Tanner (R)	Walter A. Read (R)	34R, 3D	60R, 12D	Nelson W. Aldrich (R)	George P. Wetmore (R)	Melville Bull (R)	Adin B. Capron (R)	McKinley/ Roosevelt (R) ✓
1902	Charles D. Kimball (R) (Note: Assumed office following death or resignation of predecessor.)	George L. Shepley (R)	Charles P. Bennett (R)	Charles F. Stearns (R)	Walter A. Read (R)	30R, 8D	53R, 18D, 1I	Nelson W. Aldrich (R)	George P. Wetmore (R)	Melville Bull (R)	Adin B. Capron (R)	McKinley/ Roosevelt (R) ✓
1903	Lucius F. C. Garvin (D)	Adelard Archambault (D)	Charles P. Bennett (R)	Charles F. Stearns (R)	Walter A. Read (R)	27R, 11D	37R, 35D	Nelson W. Aldrich (R)	George P. Wetmore (R)	Daniel L. D. Granger (D)	Adin B. Capron (R)	McKinley/ Roosevelt (R) ✓
1904	Lucius F. C. Garvin (D)	George H. Utter (R)	Charles P. Bennett (R)	Charles F. Stearns (R)	Walter A. Read (R)	27R, 10D, 1I	39R, 32D, 1I	Nelson W. Aldrich (R)	George P. Wetmore (R)	Daniel L. D. Granger (D)	Adin B. Capron (R)	Roosevelt/ Fairbanks (R) ✓
1905	George H. Utter (R)	Frederick H. Jackson (R)	Charles P. Bennett (R)	William B. Greenough (R)	Walter A. Read (R)	30R, 7D, 1I	62R, 8D, 2I	Nelson W. Aldrich (R)	George P. Wetmore (R)	Daniel L. D. Granger (D)	Adin B. Capron (R)	Roosevelt/ Fairbanks (R) ✓
1906	George H. Utter (R)	Frederick H. Jackson (R)	Charles P. Bennett (R)	William B. Greenough (R)	Walter A. Read (R)	33R, 5D	60R, 12D	Nelson W. Aldrich (R)	George P. Wetmore (R)	Daniel L. D. Granger (D)	Adin B. Capron (R)	Roosevelt/ Fairbanks (R) ✓
1907	James H. Higgins (D)	Frederick H. Jackson (R)	Charles P. Bennett (R)	William B. Greenough (R)	Walter A. Read (R)	29R, 8D, 1Cit	37R, 34D, 1I	Nelson W. Aldrich (R)	George P. Wetmore (R)	Daniel L. D. Granger (D)	Adin B. Capron (R)	Roosevelt/ Fairbanks (R) ✓
1908	James H. Higgins (D)	Ralph Watrous (R)	Charles P. Bennett (R)	William B. Greenough (R)	Walter A. Read (R)	26R, 11D, 1Cit	42R, 29D, 1Cit	Nelson W. Aldrich (R)	George P. Wetmore (R)	Daniel L. D. Granger (D)	Adin B. Capron (R)	Taft/ Sherman (R) ✓
1909	Aram J. Pothier (R)	Arthur Dennis (R)	Charles P. Bennett (R)	William B. Greenough (R)	Walter A. Read (R)	31R, 6D, 1Cit	64R, 6D, 1Cit, 1Proh	Nelson W. Aldrich (R)	George P. Wetmore (R)	William Paine Sheffield Jr. (R)	Adin B. Capron (R)	Taft/ Sherman (R) ✓
1910	Aram J. Pothier (R)	Zenas W. Bliss (R)	J. Fred Parker (R)	William B. Greenough (R)	Walter A. Read (R)	29R, 6D, 3Cit	64R, 6D, 2Cit	Nelson W. Aldrich (R)	George P. Wetmore (R)	William Paine Sheffield Jr. (R)	Adin B. Capron (R)	Taft/ Sherman (R) ✓
1911	Aram J. Pothier (R)	Zenas W. Bliss (R)	J. Fred Parker (R)	William B. Greenough (R)	Walter A. Read (R)	25R, 13D	62R, 38D	Henry F. Lippitt (R)	George P. Wetmore (R)	George F. O'Shaunessy (D)	George H. Utter (R)	Taft/ Sherman (R) ✓
1912	Aram J. Pothier (R)	Zenas W. Bliss (R)	J. Fred Parker (R)	Herbert A. Rice (R)	Walter A. Read (R)	33R, 5D	71R, 28D, 1Soc	Henry F. Lippitt (R)	George P. Wetmore (R)	George F. O'Shaunessy (D)	George H. Utter (R)	Wilson/ Marshall (D) ✓
1913	Aram J. Pothier (R)	Roswell Burchard (R)	J. Fred Parker (R)	Herbert A. Rice (R)	Walter A. Read (R)	28R, 10D	54R, 45D, 1Prog	Henry F. Lippitt (R)	George P. Wetmore (R)	2D, 1R		Wilson/ Marshall (D) ✓
1914	Aram J. Pothier (R)	Roswell Burchard (R)	J. Fred Parker (R)	Herbert A. Rice (R)	Walter A. Read (R)	28R, 10D	54R, 45D, 1Prog	Henry F. Lippitt (R)	LeBaron B. Colt (R)	2D, 1R		Wilson/ Marshall (D) ✓
1915	Robert Livingston Beeckman (R)	Emery J. San Souci (R)	J. Fred Parker (R)	Herbert A. Rice (R)	Walter A. Read (R)	35R, 3D, 1I	70R, 29D, 1Prog	Henry F. Lippitt (R)	LeBaron B. Colt (R)	2R, 1D		Wilson/ Marshall (D) ✓
1916	Robert Livingston Beeckman (R)	Emery J. San Souci (R)	J. Fred Parker (R)	Herbert A. Rice (R)	Walter A. Read (R)	35R, 3D, 1I	70R, 29D, 1Prog	Henry F. Lippitt (R)	LeBaron B. Colt (R)	2R, 1D		Hughes/ Fairbanks (R) ✗
1917	Robert Livingston Beeckman (R)	Emery J. San Souci (R)	J. Fred Parker (R)	Herbert A. Rice (R)	Walter A. Read (R)	25R, 13D, 1I	65R, 34D, 1Pg	Peter G. Gerry (D)	LeBaron B. Colt (R)	2R, 1D		Hughes/ Fairbanks (R) ✗
1918	Robert Livingston Beeckman (R)	Emery J. San Souci (R)	J. Fred Parker (R)	Herbert A. Rice (R)	Walter A. Read (R)	25R, 13D, 1I	65R, 34D, 1Pg	Peter G. Gerry (D)	LeBaron B. Colt (R)	2R, 1D		Hughes/ Fairbanks (R) ✗
1919	Robert Livingston Beeckman (R)	Emery J. San Souci (R)	J. Fred Parker (R)	Herbert A. Rice (R)	Richard W. Jennings (R)	31R, 8D	67R, 33D	Peter G. Gerry (D)	LeBaron B. Colt (R)	3R		Hughes/ Fairbanks (R) ✗
1920	Robert Livingston Beeckman (R)	Emery J. San Souci (R)	J. Fred Parker (R)	Herbert A. Rice (R)	Richard W. Jennings (R)	31R, 8D	67R, 33D	Peter G. Gerry (D)	LeBaron B. Colt (R)	3R		Harding/ Coolidge (R) ✓
1921	Emery J. San Souci (R)	Harold Gross (R)	J. Fred Parker (R)	Herbert A. Rice (R)	Richard W. Jennings (R)	32R, 6D, 1Cit	75R, 23D, 1I, 1?	Peter G. Gerry (D)	LeBaron B. Colt (R)	3R		Harding/ Coolidge (R) ✓
1922	Emery J. San Souci (R)	Harold Gross (R)	J. Fred Parker (R)	Herbert A. Rice (R)	Richard W. Jennings (R)	32R, 6D, 1Cit	75R, 23D, 1I, 1?	Peter G. Gerry (D)	LeBaron B. Colt (R)	3R		Harding/ Coolidge (R) ✓
1923	William S. Flynn (D)	Felix Toupin (D)	J. Fred Parker (R)	Herbert L. Carpenter (D)	Adolphus C. Knowles (R)	20R, 16D, 3I	50R, 48D, 2DI	Peter G. Gerry (D)	LeBaron B. Colt (R)	2R, 1D		Harding/ Coolidge (R) ✓
1924	William S. Flynn (D)	Felix Toupin (D)	Ernest L. Sprague (R)	Herbert L. Carpenter (D)	Adolphus C. Knowles (R)	20R, 16D, 3I	50R, 48D, 2DI	Peter G. Gerry (D)	Jesse H. Metcalf (R)	2R, 1D		Coolidge/ Dawes (R) ✓
1925	Aram J. Pothier (R)	Nathaniel W. Smith (R)	Ernest L. Sprague (R)	Charles P. Sisson (R) (Note: Resigned.)	Richard W. Jennings (R)	33R, 6D	67R, 33D	Peter G. Gerry (D)	Jesse H. Metcalf (R)	2R, 1D		Coolidge/ Dawes (R) ✓
1926	Aram J. Pothier (R)	Nathaniel W. Smith (R)	Ernest L. Sprague (R)	Charles P. Sisson (R)	Richard W. Jennings (R)	33R, 6D	67R, 33D	Peter G. Gerry (D)	Jesse H. Metcalf (R)	2R, 1D		Coolidge/ Dawes (R) ✓
1927	Aram J. Pothier (R)	Norman S. Case (R)	Ernest L. Sprague (R)	Charles P. Sisson (R)	George C. Clark (R)	34R, 5D	75R, 25D	Peter G. Gerry (D)	Jesse H. Metcalf (R)	3R		Coolidge/ Dawes (R) ✓
1928	Norman S. Case (R)	vacant	Ernest L. Sprague (R)	Charles P. Sisson (R)	George C. Clark (R)	34R, 5D	75R, 25D	Peter G. Gerry (D)	Jesse H. Metcalf (R)	3R		Smith/ Robinson (D) ✗
1929	Norman S. Case (R)	James G. Connelly (R)	Ernest L. Sprague (R)	Oscar L. Heltzen (R) (Note: Initially appointed to fill a vacancy.)	George C. Clark (R)	29R, 10D	61R, 39D	Felix Hebert (R)	Jesse H. Metcalf (R)	2R, 1D		Smith/ Robinson (D) ✗
1930	Norman S. Case (R)	James G. Connelly (R)	Ernest L. Sprague (R)	Oscar L. Heltzen (R)	George C. Clark (R)	29R, 10D	61R, 39D	Felix Hebert (R)	Jesse H. Metcalf (R)	2R, 1D		Smith/ Robinson (D) ✗
1931	Norman S. Case (R)	James G. Connelly (R)	Ernest L. Sprague (R)	Benjamin M. McLyman (R)	George C. Clark (R)	31R, 11D	62R, 38D	Felix Hebert (R)	Jesse H. Metcalf (R)	2R, 1D		Smith/ Robinson (D) ✗
1932	Norman S. Case (R)	James G. Connelly (R)	Ernest L. Sprague (R)	Benjamin M. McLyman (R)	George C. Clark (R)	31R, 11D	62R, 38D	Felix Hebert (R)	Jesse H. Metcalf (R)	2R, 1D		Roosevelt/ Garner (D) ✓
1933	Theodore F. Green (D)	Robert E. Quinn (D)	Louis W. Cappelli (D)	John Patrick Hartigan (D)	Antonio Prince (D) (Note: Resigned May 22, 1936, to become Postmaster of Woonsocket, Rhode Island.)	27R, 15D	51R, 49D	Felix Hebert (R)	Jesse H. Metcalf (R)	Francis Condon (D)	John M. O'Connell (D)	Roosevelt/ Garner (D) ✓
1934	Theodore F. Green (D)	Robert E. Quinn (D)	Louis W. Cappelli (D)	John Patrick Hartigan (D)	Antonio Prince (D)	27R, 15D	51R, 49D	Felix Hebert (R)	Jesse H. Metcalf (R)	Francis Condon (D)	John M. O'Connell (D)	Roosevelt/ Garner (D) ✓
1935	Theodore F. Green (D)	Robert E. Quinn (D)	Louis W. Cappelli (D)	John Patrick Hartigan (D)	Antonio Prince (D)	22D, 20R	57D, 43R	Peter G. Gerry (D)	Jesse H. Metcalf (R)	Charles Risk (R)	John M. O'Connell (D)	Roosevelt/ Garner (D) ✓
1936	Theodore F. Green (D)	Robert E. Quinn (D)	Louis W. Cappelli (D)	John Patrick Hartigan (D)	Percival de St. Aubin (R)	22D, 20R	57D, 43R	Peter G. Gerry (D)	Jesse H. Metcalf (R)	Charles Risk (R)	John M. O'Connell (D)	Roosevelt/ Garner (D) ✓
1937	Robert E. Quinn (D)	Raymond E. Jordan (D)	Louis W. Cappelli (D)	John Patrick Hartigan (D)	Henri A. Roberge (D)	27R, 15D	54D, 46R	Peter G. Gerry (D)	Theodore F. Green (D)	Aime Forand (D)	John M. O'Connell (D)	Roosevelt/ Garner (D) ✓
1938	Robert E. Quinn (D)	Raymond E. Jordan (D)	Louis W. Cappelli (D)	John Patrick Hartigan (D)	Henri A. Roberge (D)	27R, 15D	54D, 46R	Peter G. Gerry (D)	Theodore F. Green (D)	Aime Forand (D)	John M. O'Connell (D)	Roosevelt/ Garner (D) ✓
1939	William Vanderbilt (R)	James O. McManus (R)	J. Hector Paquin (R)	Louis V. Jackvony (R)	Thomas P. Hazard (R)	34R, 10D	61R, 39D	Peter G. Gerry (D)	Theodore F. Green (D)	Charles Risk (R)	Harry Sandager (R)	Roosevelt/ Garner (D) ✓
1940	William Vanderbilt (R)	James O. McManus (R)	J. Hector Paquin (R)	Louis V. Jackvony (R)	Thomas P. Hazard (R)	34R, 10D	61R, 39D	Peter G. Gerry (D)	Theodore F. Green (D)	Charles Risk (R)	Harry Sandager (R)	Roosevelt/ Wallace (D) ✓
1941	J. Howard McGrath (D) (Note: Resigned to become U.S. Solicitor General.)	Louis W. Cappelli (D)	Armand H. Cote (D)	John H. Nolan (D)	Russell H. Handy (D)	25R, 19D	59D, 41R	Peter G. Gerry (D)	Theodore F. Green (D)	Aime Forand (D)	John E. Fogarty (D)	Roosevelt/ Wallace (D) ✓
1942	J. Howard McGrath (D)	Louis W. Cappelli (D)	Armand H. Cote (D)	John H. Nolan (D)	Russell H. Handy (D)	25R, 19D	59D, 41R	Peter G. Gerry (D)	Theodore F. Green (D)	Aime Forand (D)	John E. Fogarty (D)	Roosevelt/ Wallace (D) ✓
1943	J. Howard McGrath (D)	Louis W. Cappelli (D)	Armand H. Cote (D)	John H. Nolan (D)	Russell H. Handy (D)	26R, 18D	58D, 42R	Peter G. Gerry (D)	Theodore F. Green (D)	Aime Forand (D)	John E. Fogarty (D)	Roosevelt/ Wallace (D) ✓
1944	J. Howard McGrath (D)	Louis W. Cappelli (D)	Armand H. Cote (D)	John H. Nolan (D)	Russell H. Handy (D)	26R, 18D	58D, 42R	Peter G. Gerry (D)	Theodore F. Green (D)	Aime Forand (D)	John E. Fogarty (D)	Roosevelt/ Truman (D) ✓
1945	J. Howard McGrath (D)	John Pastore (D)	Armand H. Cote (D)	John H. Nolan (D)	Russell H. Handy (D)	24R, 20D	67D, 33R	Peter G. Gerry (D)	Theodore F. Green (D)	Aime Forand (D)	John E. Fogarty (D)	Roosevelt/ Truman (D) ✓
1946	John Pastore (D) (Note: Resigned on Dec. 18, 1950, to become a U.S. Senator.)	vacant	Armand H. Cote (D)	John H. Nolan (D)	Russell H. Handy (D)	24R, 20D	67D, 33R	Peter G. Gerry (D)	Theodore F. Green (D)	Aime Forand (D)	John E. Fogarty (D)	Roosevelt/ Truman (D) ✓
1947	John Pastore (D)	John S. McKiernan (D)	Armand H. Cote (D)	John H. Nolan (D)	Russell H. Handy (D)	28R, 16D	56D, 44R	J. Howard McGrath (D)	Theodore F. Green (D)	Aime Forand (D)	John E. Fogarty (D)	Roosevelt/ Truman (D) ✓
1948	John Pastore (D)	John S. McKiernan (D)	Armand H. Cote (D)	John H. Nolan (D)	Russell H. Handy (D)	28R, 16D	56D, 44R	J. Howard McGrath (D)	Theodore F. Green (D)	Aime Forand (D)	John E. Fogarty (D)	Truman/ Barkley (D) ✓
1949	John Pastore (D)	John S. McKiernan (D)	Armand H. Cote (D)	William E. Powers (D)	Raymond Hawksley (D)	22R, 22D	64D, 36R	Edward L. Leahy (D)	Theodore F. Green (D)	Aime Forand (D)	John E. Fogarty (D)	Truman/ Barkley (D) ✓
1950	John Pastore (D)	John S. McKiernan (D)	Armand H. Cote (D)	William E. Powers (D)	Raymond Hawksley (D)	22R, 22D	64D, 36R	Edward L. Leahy (D)	Theodore F. Green (D)	Aime Forand (D)	John E. Fogarty (D)	Truman/ Barkley (D) ✓
1950	John S. McKiernan (D)	John S. McKiernan (D)	Armand H. Cote (D)	William E. Powers (D)	Raymond Hawksley (D)	22R, 22D	64D, 36R	Edward L. Leahy (D)	Theodore F. Green (D)	Aime Forand (D)	John E. Fogarty (D)	Truman/ Barkley (D) ✓
1951	Dennis J. Roberts (D)	John S. McKiernan (D)	Armand H. Cote (D)	William E. Powers (D)	Raymond Hawksley (D)	23R, 21D	67D, 33R	John Pastore (D)	Theodore F. Green (D)	Aime Forand (D)	John E. Fogarty (D)	Truman/ Barkley (D) ✓
1952	Dennis J. Roberts (D)	John S. McKiernan (D)	Armand H. Cote (D)	William E. Powers (D)	Raymond Hawksley (D)	23R, 21D	67D, 33R	John Pastore (D)	Theodore F. Green (D)	Aime Forand (D)	John E. Fogarty (D)	Eisenhower/ Nixon (R) ✓
1953	Dennis J. Roberts (D)	John S. McKiernan (D)	Armand H. Cote (D)	William E. Powers (D)	Raymond Hawksley (D)	26R, 18D	58D, 42R	John Pastore (D)	Theodore F. Green (D)	Aime Forand (D)	John E. Fogarty (D)	Eisenhower/ Nixon (R) ✓
1954	Dennis J. Roberts (D)	John S. McKiernan (D)	Armand H. Cote (D)	William E. Powers (D)	Raymond Hawksley (D)	26R, 18D	58D, 42R	John Pastore (D)	Theodore F. Green (D)	Aime Forand (D)	John E. Fogarty (D)	Eisenhower/ Nixon (R) ✓
1955	Dennis J. Roberts (D)	John S. McKiernan (D)	Armand H. Cote (D)	William E. Powers (D)	Raymond Hawksley (D)	22R, 22D	67D, 33R	John Pastore (D)	Theodore F. Green (D)	Aime Forand (D)	John E. Fogarty (D)	Eisenhower/ Nixon (R) ✓
1956	Dennis J. Roberts (D)	John S. McKiernan (D)	Armand H. Cote (D)	William E. Powers (D)	Raymond Hawksley (D)	22R, 22D	67D, 33R	John Pastore (D)	Theodore F. Green (D)	Aime Forand (D)	John E. Fogarty (D)	Eisenhower/ Nixon (R) ✓
1957	Dennis J. Roberts (D)	Armand H. Cote (D)	John A. Notte Jr. (D)	William E. Powers (D)	Raymond Hawksley (D)	25R, 19D	64D, 36R	John Pastore (D)	Theodore F. Green (D)	Aime Forand (D)	John E. Fogarty (D)	Eisenhower/ Nixon (R) ✓
1958	Dennis J. Roberts (D)	Armand H. Cote (D)	John A. Notte Jr. (D)	William E. Powers (D)	Raymond Hawksley (D)	25R, 19D	64D, 36R	John Pastore (D)	Theodore F. Green (D)	Aime Forand (D)	John E. Fogarty (D)	Eisenhower/ Nixon (R) ✓
1959	Christopher Del Sesto (R)	John A. Notte Jr. (D)	August P. LaFrance (D)	J. Joseph Nugent (D)	Raymond Hawksley (D)	23D, 21R	71D, 29R	John Pastore (D)	Theodore F. Green (D)	Aime Forand (D)	John E. Fogarty (D)	Eisenhower/ Nixon (R) ✓
1960	Christopher Del Sesto (R)	John A. Notte Jr. (D)	August P. LaFrance (D)	J. Joseph Nugent (D)	Raymond Hawksley (D)	23D, 21R	71D, 29R	John Pastore (D)	Theodore F. Green (D)	Aime Forand (D)	John E. Fogarty (D)	Kennedy/ Johnson (D) ✓
1961	John A. Notte Jr. (D)	Edward P. Gallogly (D)	August P. LaFrance (D)	J. Joseph Nugent (D)	Raymond Hawksley (D)	28D, 16R	80D, 20R	John Pastore (D)	Claiborne Pell (D)	Fernand St Germain (D)	John E. Fogarty (D)	Kennedy/ Johnson (D) ✓
1962	John A. Notte Jr. (D)	Edward P. Gallogly (D)	August P. LaFrance (D)	J. Joseph Nugent (D)	Raymond Hawksley (D)	28D, 16R	80D, 20R	John Pastore (D)	Claiborne Pell (D)	Fernand St Germain (D)	John E. Fogarty (D)	Kennedy/ Johnson (D) ✓
1963	John Chafee (R)	Edward P. Gallogly (D)	August P. LaFrance (D)	J. Joseph Nugent (D)	Raymond Hawksley (D)	27D, 19R	74D, 26R	John Pastore (D)	Claiborne Pell (D)	Fernand St Germain (D)	John E. Fogarty (D)	Kennedy/ Johnson (D) ✓
1964	John Chafee (R)	Edward P. Gallogly (D)	August P. LaFrance (D)	J. Joseph Nugent (D)	Raymond Hawksley (D)	27D, 19R	74D, 26R	John Pastore (D)	Claiborne Pell (D)	Fernand St Germain (D)	John E. Fogarty (D)	Johnson/ Humphrey (D) ✓
1965	John Chafee (R)	Giovanni Folcarelli (D)	August P. LaFrance (D)	J. Joseph Nugent (D)	Raymond Hawksley (D)	30D, 15R, 1I	76D, 24R	John Pastore (D)	Claiborne Pell (D)	Fernand St Germain (D)	John E. Fogarty (D)	Johnson/ Humphrey (D) ✓
1966	John Chafee (R)	Giovanni Folcarelli (D)	August P. LaFrance (D)	J. Joseph Nugent (D)	Raymond Hawksley (D)	30D, 15R, 1I	76D, 24R	John Pastore (D)	Claiborne Pell (D)	Fernand St Germain (D)	John E. Fogarty (D)	Johnson/ Humphrey (D) ✓
1967	John Chafee (R)	Joseph O'Donnell Jr. (R)	August P. LaFrance (D)	Herbert F. DeSimone (R)	Raymond Hawksley (D)	35D, 15R	67D, 33R	John Pastore (D)	Claiborne Pell (D)	Fernand St Germain (D)	Robert Tiernan (D)	Johnson/ Humphrey (D) ✓
1968	John Chafee (R)	Joseph O'Donnell Jr. (R)	August P. LaFrance (D)	Herbert F. DeSimone (R)	Raymond Hawksley (D)	35D, 15R	67D, 33R	John Pastore (D)	Claiborne Pell (D)	Fernand St Germain (D)	Robert Tiernan (D)	Humphrey/ Muskie (D) ✗
1969	Frank Licht (D)	J. Joseph Garrahy (D)	August P. LaFrance (D)	Herbert F. DeSimone (R)	Raymond Hawksley (D)	37D, 13R	76D, 24R	John Pastore (D)	Claiborne Pell (D)	Fernand St Germain (D)	Robert Tiernan (D)	Humphrey/ Muskie (D) ✗
1970	Frank Licht (D)	J. Joseph Garrahy (D)	August P. LaFrance (D)	Herbert F. DeSimone (R)	Raymond Hawksley (D)	37D, 13R	76D, 24R	John Pastore (D)	Claiborne Pell (D)	Fernand St Germain (D)	Robert Tiernan (D)	Humphrey/ Muskie (D) ✗
1971	Frank Licht (D)	J. Joseph Garrahy (D)	August P. LaFrance (D)	Richard J. Israel (R)	Raymond Hawksley (D)	41D, 9R	75D, 24R, 1I	John Pastore (D)	Claiborne Pell (D)	Fernand St Germain (D)	Robert Tiernan (D)	Humphrey/ Muskie (D) ✗
1972	Frank Licht (D)	J. Joseph Garrahy (D)	August P. LaFrance (D)	Richard J. Israel (R)	Raymond Hawksley (D)	41D, 9R	75D, 24R, 1I	John Pastore (D)	Claiborne Pell (D)	Fernand St Germain (D)	Robert Tiernan (D)	Nixon/ Agnew (R) ✓
1973	Philip Noel (D)	J. Joseph Garrahy (D)	Robert F. Burns (D)	Richard J. Israel (R)	Raymond Hawksley (D)	37D, 13R	75D, 25R	John Pastore (D)	Claiborne Pell (D)	Fernand St Germain (D)	Robert Tiernan (D)	Nixon/ Agnew (R) ✓
1974	Philip Noel (D)	J. Joseph Garrahy (D)	Robert F. Burns (D)	Richard J. Israel (R)	Raymond Hawksley (D)	37D, 13R	75D, 25R	John Pastore (D)	Claiborne Pell (D)	Fernand St Germain (D)	Robert Tiernan (D)	Nixon/ Agnew (R) ✓
1975	Philip Noel (D)	J. Joseph Garrahy (D)	Robert F. Burns (D)	Julius C. Michaelson (D)	Raymond Hawksley (D)	46D, 4R	86D, 14R	John Pastore (D)	Claiborne Pell (D)	Fernand St Germain (D)	Edward Beard (D)	Nixon/ Agnew (R) ✓
1976	Philip Noel (D)	J. Joseph Garrahy (D)	Robert F. Burns (D)	Julius C. Michaelson (D)	Raymond Hawksley (D)	46D, 4R	86D, 14R	John Pastore (D)	Claiborne Pell (D)	Fernand St Germain (D)	Edward Beard (D)	Carter/ Mondale (D) ✓
1977	J. Joseph Garrahy (D)	Thomas R. DiLuglio (D)	Robert F. Burns (D)	Julius C. Michaelson (D)	Anthony J. Solomon (D)	45D, 5R	83D, 17R	John Chafee (R)	Claiborne Pell (D)	Fernand St Germain (D)	Edward Beard (D)	Carter/ Mondale (D) ✓
1978	J. Joseph Garrahy (D)	Thomas R. DiLuglio (D)	Robert F. Burns (D)	Julius C. Michaelson (D)	Anthony J. Solomon (D)	45D, 5R	83D, 17R	John Chafee (R)	Claiborne Pell (D)	Fernand St Germain (D)	Edward Beard (D)	Carter/ Mondale (D) ✓
1979	J. Joseph Garrahy (D)	Thomas R. DiLuglio (D)	Robert F. Burns (D)	Dennis J. Roberts II (D)	Anthony J. Solomon (D)	45D, 5R	84D, 16R	John Chafee (R)	Claiborne Pell (D)	Fernand St Germain (D)	Edward Beard (D)	Carter/ Mondale (D) ✓
1980	J. Joseph Garrahy (D)	Thomas R. DiLuglio (D)	Robert F. Burns (D)	Dennis J. Roberts II (D)	Anthony J. Solomon (D)	45D, 5R	84D, 16R	John Chafee (R)	Claiborne Pell (D)	Fernand St Germain (D)	Edward Beard (D)	Carter/ Mondale (D) ✗
1981	J. Joseph Garrahy (D)	Thomas R. DiLuglio (D)	Robert F. Burns (D)	Dennis J. Roberts II (D)	Anthony J. Solomon (D)	43D, 7R	82D, 18R	John Chafee (R)	Claiborne Pell (D)	Fernand St Germain (D)	Claudine Schneider (R)	Carter/ Mondale (D) ✗
1982	J. Joseph Garrahy (D)	Thomas R. DiLuglio (D)	Robert F. Burns (D)	Dennis J. Roberts II (D)	Anthony J. Solomon (D)	43D, 7R	82D, 18R	John Chafee (R)	Claiborne Pell (D)	Fernand St Germain (D)	Claudine Schneider (R)	Carter/ Mondale (D) ✗
1983	J. Joseph Garrahy (D)	Thomas R. DiLuglio (D)	Susan Farmer (R)	Dennis J. Roberts II (D)	Anthony J. Solomon (D)	43D, 7R	86D, 14R	John Chafee (R)	Claiborne Pell (D)	Fernand St Germain (D)	Claudine Schneider (R)	Carter/ Mondale (D) ✗
1984	J. Joseph Garrahy (D)	Thomas R. DiLuglio (D)	Susan Farmer (R)	Dennis J. Roberts II (D)	Anthony J. Solomon (D)	29D, 21R (Note: Due to legal issues with reapportionment, the state senate election was delayed until June 21, 1983.)	86D, 14R	John Chafee (R)	Claiborne Pell (D)	Fernand St Germain (D)	Claudine Schneider (R)	Reagan/ Bush (R) ✓
1985	Edward D. DiPrete (R)	Richard A. Licht (D)	Susan Farmer (R)	Arlene Violet (R)	Roger N. Begin (D)	36D, 14R	76D, 23R, 1I	John Chafee (R)	Claiborne Pell (D)	Fernand St Germain (D)	Claudine Schneider (R)	Reagan/ Bush (R) ✓
1986	Edward D. DiPrete (R)	Richard A. Licht (D)	Susan Farmer (R)	Arlene Violet (R)	Roger N. Begin (D)	36D, 14R	76D, 23R, 1I	John Chafee (R)	Claiborne Pell (D)	Fernand St Germain (D)	Claudine Schneider (R)	Reagan/ Bush (R) ✓
1987	Edward D. DiPrete (R)	Richard A. Licht (D)	Kathleen S. Connell (D)	James E. O'Neil (D)	Roger N. Begin (D)	38D, 12R	80D, 20R	John Chafee (R)	Claiborne Pell (D)	Fernand St Germain (D)	Claudine Schneider (R)	Reagan/ Bush (R) ✓
1988	Edward D. DiPrete (R)	Richard A. Licht (D)	Kathleen S. Connell (D)	James E. O'Neil (D)	Roger N. Begin (D)	38D, 12R	80D, 20R	John Chafee (R)	Claiborne Pell (D)	Fernand St Germain (D)	Claudine Schneider (R)	Dukakis/ Bentsen (D) ✗
1989	Edward D. DiPrete (R)	Roger N. Begin (D)	Kathleen S. Connell (D)	James E. O'Neil (D)	Anthony J. Solomon (D)	41D, 9R	86D, 14R	John Chafee (R)	Claiborne Pell (D)	Ronald Machtley (R)	Claudine Schneider (R)	Dukakis/ Bentsen (D) ✗
1990	Edward D. DiPrete (R)	Roger N. Begin (D)	Kathleen S. Connell (D)	James E. O'Neil (D)	Anthony J. Solomon (D)	41D, 9R	86D, 14R	John Chafee (R)	Claiborne Pell (D)	Ronald Machtley (R)	Claudine Schneider (R)	Dukakis/ Bentsen (D) ✗
1991	Bruce Sundlun (D)	Roger N. Begin (D)	Kathleen S. Connell (D)	James E. O'Neil (D)	Anthony J. Solomon (D)	45D, 5R	89D, 11R	John Chafee (R)	Claiborne Pell (D)	Ronald Machtley (R)	Jack Reed (D)	Dukakis/ Bentsen (D) ✗
1992	Bruce Sundlun (D)	Roger N. Begin (D)	Kathleen S. Connell (D)	James E. O'Neil (D)	Anthony J. Solomon (D)	45D, 5R	89D, 11R	John Chafee (R)	Claiborne Pell (D)	Ronald Machtley (R)	Jack Reed (D)	Clinton/ Gore (D) ✓
1993	Bruce Sundlun (D)	Robert Weygand (D)	Barbara Leonard (R)	Jeffrey B. Pine (R)	Nancy Mayer (R)	39D, 11R	85D, 15R	John Chafee (R)	Claiborne Pell (D)	Ronald Machtley (R)	Jack Reed (D)	Clinton/ Gore (D) ✓
1994	Bruce Sundlun (D)	Robert Weygand (D)	Barbara Leonard (R)	Jeffrey B. Pine (R)	Nancy Mayer (R)	39D, 11R	85D, 15R	John Chafee (R)	Claiborne Pell (D)	Ronald Machtley (R)	Jack Reed (D)	Clinton/ Gore (D) ✓
1995	Lincoln Almond (R)	Robert Weygand (D)	James Langevin (D)	Jeffrey B. Pine (R)	Nancy Mayer (R)	40D, 10R	84D, 16R	John Chafee (R)	Claiborne Pell (D)	Patrick J. Kennedy (D)	Jack Reed (D)	Clinton/ Gore (D) ✓
1996	Lincoln Almond (R)	Robert Weygand (D)	James Langevin (D)	Jeffrey B. Pine (R)	Nancy Mayer (R)	40D, 10R	84D, 16R	John Chafee (R)	Claiborne Pell (D)	Patrick J. Kennedy (D)	Jack Reed (D)	Clinton/ Gore (D) ✓
1997	Lincoln Almond (R)	Bernard Jackvony (R)	James Langevin (D)	Jeffrey B. Pine (R)	Nancy Mayer (R)	41D, 9R	84D, 16R	John Chafee (R)	Jack Reed (D)	Patrick J. Kennedy (D)	Robert Weygand (D)	Clinton/ Gore (D) ✓
1998	Lincoln Almond (R)	Bernard Jackvony (R)	James Langevin (D)	Jeffrey B. Pine (R)	Nancy Mayer (R)	41D, 9R	84D, 16R	John Chafee (R)	Jack Reed (D)	Patrick J. Kennedy (D)	Robert Weygand (D)	Clinton/ Gore (D) ✓
1999	Lincoln Almond (R)	Charles Fogarty (D)	James Langevin (D)	Sheldon Whitehouse (D)	Paul J. Tavares (D)	42D, 8R	86D, 13R, 1I	John Chafee (R)	Jack Reed (D)	Patrick J. Kennedy (D)	Robert Weygand (D)	Clinton/ Gore (D) ✓
2000	Lincoln Almond (R)	Charles Fogarty (D)	James Langevin (D)	Sheldon Whitehouse (D)	Paul J. Tavares (D)	42D, 8R	86D, 13R, 1I	Lincoln Chafee (R) (Note: Initially appointed to fill vacancy; later elected in his own right.)	Jack Reed (D)	Patrick J. Kennedy (D)	Robert Weygand (D)	Gore/ Lieberman (D) ✗
2001	Lincoln Almond (R)	Charles Fogarty (D)	Ed Inman (I)	Sheldon Whitehouse (D)	Paul J. Tavares (D)	44D, 6R	85D, 15R	Lincoln Chafee (R)	Jack Reed (D)	Patrick J. Kennedy (D)	James Langevin (D)	Gore/ Lieberman (D) ✗
2002	Lincoln Almond (R)	Charles Fogarty (D)	Ed Inman (I)	Sheldon Whitehouse (D)	Paul J. Tavares (D)	44D, 6R	85D, 15R	Lincoln Chafee (R)	Jack Reed (D)	Patrick J. Kennedy (D)	James Langevin (D)	Gore/ Lieberman (D) ✗
2003	Donald Carcieri (R)	Charles Fogarty (D)	Matt Brown (D)	Patrick Lynch (D)	Paul J. Tavares (D)	32D, 6R	63D, 11R, 1I	Lincoln Chafee (R)	Jack Reed (D)	Patrick J. Kennedy (D)	James Langevin (D)	Gore/ Lieberman (D) ✗
2004	Donald Carcieri (R)	Charles Fogarty (D)	Matt Brown (D)	Patrick Lynch (D)	Paul J. Tavares (D)	32D, 6R	63D, 11R, 1I	Lincoln Chafee (R)	Jack Reed (D)	Patrick J. Kennedy (D)	James Langevin (D)	Kerry/ Edwards (D) ✗
2005	Donald Carcieri (R)	Charles Fogarty (D)	Matt Brown (D)	Patrick Lynch (D)	Paul J. Tavares (D)	33D, 5R	59D, 16R	Lincoln Chafee (R)	Jack Reed (D)	Patrick J. Kennedy (D)	James Langevin (D)	Kerry/ Edwards (D) ✗
2006	Donald Carcieri (R)	Charles Fogarty (D)	Matt Brown (D)	Patrick Lynch (D)	Paul J. Tavares (D)	33D, 5R	59D, 16R	Lincoln Chafee (R)	Jack Reed (D)	Patrick J. Kennedy (D)	James Langevin (D)	Kerry/ Edwards (D) ✗
2007	Donald Carcieri (R)	Elizabeth H. Roberts (D)	Ralph Mollis (D)	Patrick Lynch (D)	Frank T. Caprio (D)	33D, 5R	60D, 15R	Sheldon Whitehouse (D)	Jack Reed (D)	Patrick J. Kennedy (D)	James Langevin (D)	Kerry/ Edwards (D) ✗
2008	Donald Carcieri (R)	Elizabeth H. Roberts (D)	Ralph Mollis (D)	Patrick Lynch (D)	Frank T. Caprio (D)	33D, 5R	60D, 15R	Sheldon Whitehouse (D)	Jack Reed (D)	Patrick J. Kennedy (D)	James Langevin (D)	Obama/ Biden (D) ✓
2009	Donald Carcieri (R)	Elizabeth H. Roberts (D)	Ralph Mollis (D)	Patrick Lynch (D)	Frank T. Caprio (D)	33D, 4R, 1I	69D, 6R	Sheldon Whitehouse (D)	Jack Reed (D)	Patrick J. Kennedy (D)	James Langevin (D)	Obama/ Biden (D) ✓
2010	Donald Carcieri (R)	Elizabeth H. Roberts (D)	Ralph Mollis (D)	Patrick Lynch (D)	Frank T. Caprio (D)	33D, 4R, 1I	69D, 6R	Sheldon Whitehouse (D)	Jack Reed (D)	Patrick J. Kennedy (D)	James Langevin (D)	Obama/ Biden (D) ✓
2011	Lincoln Chafee (I)	Elizabeth H. Roberts (D)	Ralph Mollis (D)	Peter Kilmartin (D)	Gina Raimondo (D)	29D, 8R, 1I	65D, 10R	Sheldon Whitehouse (D)	Jack Reed (D)	David Cicilline (D)	James Langevin (D)	Obama/ Biden (D) ✓
2012	Lincoln Chafee (I)	Elizabeth H. Roberts (D)	Ralph Mollis (D)	Peter Kilmartin (D)	Gina Raimondo (D)	29D, 8R, 1I	65D, 9R, 1L (Note: Daniel P. Gordon of House District 71 switched his affiliation from Republican to Libertarian on September 22, 2011.)	Sheldon Whitehouse (D)	Jack Reed (D)	David Cicilline (D)	James Langevin (D)	Obama/ Biden (D) ✓
2013	Lincoln Chafee (I)	Elizabeth H. Roberts (D)	Ralph Mollis (D)	Peter Kilmartin (D)	Gina Raimondo (D)	32D, 5R, 1I	69D, 6R	Sheldon Whitehouse (D)	Jack Reed (D)	David Cicilline (D)	James Langevin (D)	Obama/ Biden (D) ✓
2013	Lincoln Chafee (D)	Elizabeth H. Roberts (D)	Ralph Mollis (D)	Peter Kilmartin (D)	Gina Raimondo (D)	32D, 5R, 1I	69D, 6R	Sheldon Whitehouse (D)	Jack Reed (D)	David Cicilline (D)	James Langevin (D)	Obama/ Biden (D) ✓
2014	Lincoln Chafee (D)	Elizabeth H. Roberts (D)	Ralph Mollis (D)	Peter Kilmartin (D)	Gina Raimondo (D)	32D, 5R, 1I	69D, 6R	Sheldon Whitehouse (D)	Jack Reed (D)	David Cicilline (D)	James Langevin (D)	Obama/ Biden (D) ✓
2015	Gina Raimondo (D)	Dan McKee (D)	Nellie Gorbea (D)	Peter Kilmartin (D)	Seth Magaziner (D)	32D, 5R, 1I	63D, 11R, 1I	Sheldon Whitehouse (D)	Jack Reed (D)	David Cicilline (D)	James Langevin (D)	Obama/ Biden (D) ✓
2016	Gina Raimondo (D)	Dan McKee (D)	Nellie Gorbea (D)	Peter Kilmartin (D)	Seth Magaziner (D)	32D, 5R, 1I	62D, 12R, 1I (Note: Rep. Karen MacBeth switched parties from Democratic to Republican.)	Sheldon Whitehouse (D)	Jack Reed (D)	David Cicilline (D)	James Langevin (D)	Clinton/ Kaine (D) ✗
2017	Gina Raimondo (D)	Dan McKee (D)	Nellie Gorbea (D)	Peter Kilmartin (D)	Seth Magaziner (D)	33D, 5R	64D, 11R (Note: Rep. Blake Filippi switched parties from Independent to Republican before the start of session.)	Sheldon Whitehouse (D)	Jack Reed (D)	David Cicilline (D)	James Langevin (D)	Clinton/ Kaine (D) ✗
2018	Gina Raimondo (D)	Dan McKee (D)	Nellie Gorbea (D)	Peter Kilmartin (D)	Seth Magaziner (D)	33D, 5R	64D, 11R	Sheldon Whitehouse (D)	Jack Reed (D)	David Cicilline (D)	James Langevin (D)	Clinton/ Kaine (D) ✗
2019	Gina Raimondo (D)	Dan McKee (D)	Nellie Gorbea (D)	Peter Neronha (D)	Seth Magaziner (D)	33D, 5R	66D, 9R	Sheldon Whitehouse (D)	Jack Reed (D)	David Cicilline (D)	James Langevin (D)	Clinton/ Kaine (D) ✗
2020	Gina Raimondo (D)	Dan McKee (D)	Nellie Gorbea (D)	Peter Neronha (D)	Seth Magaziner (D)	33D, 5R	66D, 9R	Sheldon Whitehouse (D)	Jack Reed (D)	David Cicilline (D)	James Langevin (D)	Biden/ Harris (D) ✓
2021	Gina Raimondo (D)	Dan McKee (D)	Nellie Gorbea (D)	Peter Neronha (D)	Seth Magaziner (D)	33D, 5R	65D, 10R	Sheldon Whitehouse (D)	Jack Reed (D)	David Cicilline (D)	James Langevin (D)	Biden/ Harris (D) ✓
2021	Dan McKee (D)	Sabina Matos (D)	Nellie Gorbea (D)	Peter Neronha (D)	Seth Magaziner (D)	33D, 5R	65D, 10R	Sheldon Whitehouse (D)	Jack Reed (D)	David Cicilline (D)	James Langevin (D)	Biden/ Harris (D) ✓
2022	Dan McKee (D)	Sabina Matos (D)	Nellie Gorbea (D)	Peter Neronha (D)	Seth Magaziner (D)	33D, 5R	65D, 10R	Sheldon Whitehouse (D)	Jack Reed (D)	David Cicilline (D)	James Langevin (D)	Biden/ Harris (D) ✓
2023	Dan McKee (D)	Sabina Matos (D)	Gregg Amore (D)	Peter Neronha (D)	James Diossa (D)	33D, 5R	65D, 9R, 1I	Sheldon Whitehouse (D)	Jack Reed (D)	David Cicilline (D)	Seth Magaziner (D)	Biden/ Harris (D) ✓
2024	Dan McKee (D)	Sabina Matos (D)	Gregg Amore (D)	Peter Neronha (D)	James Diossa (D)	33D, 5R	65D, 9R, 1I	Sheldon Whitehouse (D)	Jack Reed (D)	Gabe Amo (D)	Seth Magaziner (D)	Harris/ Walz (D) ✗
2025	Dan McKee (D)	Sabina Matos (D)	Gregg Amore (D)	Peter Neronha (D)	James Diossa (D)	34D, 4R	64D, 10R, 1I	Sheldon Whitehouse (D)	Jack Reed (D)	Gabe Amo (D)	Seth Magaziner (D)	Harris/ Walz (D) ✗
2026	Dan McKee (D)	Sabina Matos (D)	Gregg Amore (D)	Peter Neronha (D)	James Diossa (D)	34D, 4R	64D, 10R, 1I	Sheldon Whitehouse (D)	Jack Reed (D)	Gabe Amo (D)	Seth Magaziner (D)	Harris/ Walz (D) ✗
2027	Helena Foulkes (D)	Sabina Matos (D)	Gregg Amore (D)	Kim Ahern (D)	James Diossa (D)	36D, 2R	66D, 8R, 1I	Sheldon Whitehouse (D)	Jack Reed (D)	Gabe Amo (D)	Seth Magaziner (D)	Harris/ Walz (D) ✗

Key to party colors and abbreviations for members of the U.S. Congress and other politicians or officials
Alaskan Independence (AKIP) Know Nothing (KN) American Labor (AL) Anti-Jacksonian (Anti-J); National Republican (NR) Anti-Administration (AA) Anti-Masonic (Anti-M) Conservative (Con) Covenant (Cov)	Democratic (D) Democratic–Farmer–Labor (DFL) Democratic–NPL (D-NPL) Dixiecrat (Dix), States' Rights (SR) Democratic-Republican (DR) Farmer–Labor (FL) Federalist (F); Pro-Administration (PA)	Free Soil (FS) Fusion (Fus) Greenback (GB) Independence (IPM) Jacksonian (J) Liberal (Lib) Libertarian (L) National Union (NU)	Nonpartisan League (NPL) Nullifier (N) Opposition Northern (O); Opposition Southern (O) Populist (Pop) Progressive (Prog) Prohibition (Proh) Readjuster (Rea)	Republican (R) Silver (Sv) Silver Republican (SvR) Socialist (Soc) Union (U) Unconditional Union (UU) Vermont Progressive (VP) Whig (W)	Independent (I) Nonpartisan (NP)

== See also ==
- Law and government in Rhode Island
