= 1808 United States House of Representatives election in Rhode Island =

In September 1808, the Federalist ticket won a majority in Rhode Island's election for delegates to the United States Congress, with nearly 500 votes.

District	Incumbent			This race	
District	Representative	Party	First elected	Results	Candidates
Rhode Island at-large 2 seats on a general ticket	Nehemiah Knight	Democratic-Republican	1802	Incumbent died June 13, 1808. New member elected. Federalist gain. Successor (Jackson) also elected the same day to finish the term.	√ Richard Jackson Jr. (Federalist) 26.6% √ Elisha R. Potter (Federalist) 26.4% Isaac Wilbour (Democratic-Republican) 23.6% Jonathan Russell (Democratic-Republican) 23.4%
Rhode Island at-large 2 seats on a general ticket	Isaac Wilbour	Democratic-Republican	1806	Incumbent lost re-election. New member elected. Federalist gain.	√ Richard Jackson Jr. (Federalist) 26.6% √ Elisha R. Potter (Federalist) 26.4% Isaac Wilbour (Democratic-Republican) 23.6% Jonathan Russell (Democratic-Republican) 23.4%

== See also ==
- Rhode Island's at-large congressional district special election, 1808
- United States House of Representatives elections, 1808 and 1809
- List of United States representatives from Rhode Island
