= 1808 Rhode Island's at-large congressional district special election =

A special election was held in Rhode Island's at-large congressional district on August 30, 1808, to fill a vacancy resulting from the death of Nehemiah Knight (DR) on June 13, 1808. This election was held at the same time as the 1808 elections.

== Election results ==
Candidate	Party	Votes	Percent
Richard Jackson, Jr.	Federalist	3,262	63.4%
Jonathan Russell	Democratic-Republican	1,887	36.6%

Jackson took his seat on November 11, 1808. Jackson also won election to the 11th Congress at the same time.

== See also ==
- List of special elections to the United States House of Representatives
