= Joseph L. Tillinghast =

American politician

Member of the U.S. House of Representatives from Rhode Island's at-large district
- In office March 4, 1837 – March 3, 1843
- Preceded by: Dutee J. Pearce
- Succeeded by: Seat inactive

Member of the Rhode Island House of Representatives
- In office 1826-1833

Personal details
- Born: May 18, 1790 Taunton, Massachusetts
- Died: December 30, 1844 (aged 54) Providence, Rhode Island
- Resting place: North Burial Ground
- Party: Whig
- Relatives: Pardon Tillinghast; Thomas Tillinghast

Joseph Leonard Tillinghast (May 18, 1790 – December 30, 1844) was a U.S. Representative from Rhode Island, cousin of Thomas Tillinghast.

Born in Taunton, Massachusetts, Tillinghast moved to Rhode Island and pursued classical studies. Published The Providence Gazette in 1809. He studied law. He was admitted to the bar in 1811 and began practice in Providence, Rhode Island. He served as member of the State house of representatives 1826–1833, serving as speaker 1829–1832.

Tillinghast was elected as a Whig to the Twenty-fifth, Twenty-sixth, and Twenty-seventh Congresses (March 4, 1837 – March 3, 1843). He was not a candidate for renomination. Trustee of Brown University at Providence 1833–1844. He died in Providence, Rhode Island, December 30, 1844. He was interred in North Burial Ground.

He was a great-great-grandson of Rev. Pardon Tillinghast (1622–1718).

== Sources ==
- United States Congress. "Joseph L. Tillinghast (id: T000272)". Biographical Directory of the United States Congress.
- 'The Tillinghasts in America: The First Four Generations' by Wayne G. Tillinghast (2006), Rhode Island Genealogical Society.

U.S. House of Representatives
Preceded by Dutee J. Pearce	Member of the U.S. House of Representatives from Rhode Island's at-large congressional district 1837–1843	Succeeded by Seat inactive
