= Rhode Island's at-large congressional district =

- Obsolete district
- Created: 1790
- Eliminated: 1840
- Years active: 1790–1843

The Rhode Island at-large congressional district is currently obsolete, with representation divided into two districts.

From 1790 to 1843, Rhode Island elected members to the United States House of Representatives at-large:

- From 1790 to 1793, one member represented the state.
- From 1793 to 1843, two members represented the state at-large.

== List of members representing the district ==
Cong ress	Years	Seat A			Seat B		
Cong ress	Years	Representative	Party	Electoral history	Representative	Party	Electoral history
1st	August 31, 1790 – March 3, 1791	Benjamin Bourne (Bristol)	Pro-Admin	Elected in August 1790. Re-elected in October 1790. Re-elected in 1792. Re-elected in 1794. Re-elected in 1796, but declined the seat and resigned.	Seat created in 1793		
2nd	March 3, 1791 – March 3, 1793	Benjamin Bourne (Bristol)	Pro-Admin	Elected in August 1790. Re-elected in October 1790. Re-elected in 1792. Re-elected in 1794. Re-elected in 1796, but declined the seat and resigned.	Seat created in 1793		
3rd	March 3, 1793 – March 3, 1795	Benjamin Bourne (Bristol)	Pro-Admin	Elected in August 1790. Re-elected in October 1790. Re-elected in 1792. Re-elected in 1794. Re-elected in 1796, but declined the seat and resigned.	Francis Malbone (Newport)	Pro-Admin	Elected in 1792. Re-elected in 1794. Retired.
4th	March 4, 1795 – 1796	Benjamin Bourne (Bristol)	Federalist	Elected in August 1790. Re-elected in October 1790. Re-elected in 1792. Re-elected in 1794. Re-elected in 1796, but declined the seat and resigned.	Francis Malbone (Newport)	Federalist	Elected in 1792. Re-elected in 1794. Retired.
4th	1796 – November 15, 1796	Vacant			Francis Malbone (Newport)	Federalist	Elected in 1792. Re-elected in 1794. Retired.
4th	November 15, 1796 – March 3, 1797	Elisha Reynolds Potter (Kingston)	Federalist	Elected to finish Bourne's term and to the next term. Resigned.	Francis Malbone (Newport)	Federalist	Elected in 1792. Re-elected in 1794. Retired.
5th	March 4, 1797 – 1797	Elisha Reynolds Potter (Kingston)	Federalist	Elected to finish Bourne's term and to the next term. Resigned.	Christopher G. Champlin (Newport)	Federalist	Elected in 1796. Re-elected in 1798. Lost re-election.
5th	1797 – November 13, 1797	Vacant			Christopher G. Champlin (Newport)	Federalist	Elected in 1796. Re-elected in 1798. Lost re-election.
5th	November 13, 1797 – March 3, 1799	Thomas Tillinghast (East Greenwich)	Federalist	Elected to finish Potter's term. Lost re-election.	Christopher G. Champlin (Newport)	Federalist	Elected in 1796. Re-elected in 1798. Lost re-election.
6th	March 4, 1799 – March 3, 1801	John Brown (Providence)	Federalist	Elected in 1798. Lost re-election.	Christopher G. Champlin (Newport)	Federalist	Elected in 1796. Re-elected in 1798. Lost re-election.
7th	March 4, 1801 – March 3, 1803	Joseph Stanton Jr. (Charlestown)	Democratic-Republican	Elected in 1800. Re-elected in 1802. Re-elected in 1804. Retired.	Thomas Tillinghast (East Greenwich)	Democratic-Republican	Elected in 1800. Lost re-election.
8th	March 4, 1803 – March 3, 1805	Joseph Stanton Jr. (Charlestown)	Democratic-Republican	Elected in 1800. Re-elected in 1802. Re-elected in 1804. Retired.	Nehemiah Knight (Cranston)	Democratic-Republican	Elected in 1802. Re-elected in 1804. Re-elected in 1806. Died.
9th	March 4, 1805 – March 3, 1807	Joseph Stanton Jr. (Charlestown)	Democratic-Republican	Elected in 1800. Re-elected in 1802. Re-elected in 1804. Retired.	Nehemiah Knight (Cranston)	Democratic-Republican	Elected in 1802. Re-elected in 1804. Re-elected in 1806. Died.
10th	March 4, 1807 – March 3, 1808	Isaac Wilbour (Little Compton)	Democratic-Republican	Elected in 1806. Lost re-election.	Nehemiah Knight (Cranston)	Democratic-Republican	Elected in 1802. Re-elected in 1804. Re-elected in 1806. Died.
10th	March 4, 1808 – June 13, 1808	Isaac Wilbour (Little Compton)	Democratic-Republican	Elected in 1806. Lost re-election.	Nehemiah Knight (Cranston)	Democratic-Republican	Elected in 1802. Re-elected in 1804. Re-elected in 1806. Died.
10th	June 13, 1808 – November 11, 1808	Isaac Wilbour (Little Compton)	Democratic-Republican	Elected in 1806. Lost re-election.	Vacant		
10th	November 11, 1808 – March 3, 1809	Isaac Wilbour (Little Compton)	Democratic-Republican	Elected in 1806. Lost re-election.	Richard Jackson Jr. (Providence)	Federalist	Elected August 30, 1808 to finish Knight's term and seated November 11, 1808. Also elected the same day to the next term. Re-elected in 1810. Re-elected in 1812. Retired.
11th	March 4, 1809 – March 3, 1811	Elisha Reynolds Potter (Kingston)	Federalist	Elected in 1808. Re-elected in 1810. Re-elected in 1812. Retired.	Richard Jackson Jr. (Providence)	Federalist	Elected August 30, 1808 to finish Knight's term and seated November 11, 1808. Also elected the same day to the next term. Re-elected in 1810. Re-elected in 1812. Retired.
12th	March 4, 1811 – March 3, 1813	Elisha Reynolds Potter (Kingston)	Federalist	Elected in 1808. Re-elected in 1810. Re-elected in 1812. Retired.	Richard Jackson Jr. (Providence)	Federalist	Elected August 30, 1808 to finish Knight's term and seated November 11, 1808. Also elected the same day to the next term. Re-elected in 1810. Re-elected in 1812. Retired.
13th	March 4, 1813 – March 3, 1815	Elisha Reynolds Potter (Kingston)	Federalist	Elected in 1808. Re-elected in 1810. Re-elected in 1812. Retired.	Richard Jackson Jr. (Providence)	Federalist	Elected August 30, 1808 to finish Knight's term and seated November 11, 1808. Also elected the same day to the next term. Re-elected in 1810. Re-elected in 1812. Retired.
14th	March 4, 1815 – March 3, 1817	John Linscom Boss Jr. (Newport)	Federalist	Elected in 1814. Elected in 1816. Retired.	James Brown Mason (Providence)	Federalist	Elected in 1814. Elected in 1816. Retired.
15th	March 4, 1817 – March 3, 1819	John Linscom Boss Jr. (Newport)	Federalist	Elected in 1814. Elected in 1816. Retired.	James Brown Mason (Providence)	Federalist	Elected in 1814. Elected in 1816. Retired.
16th	March 4, 1819 – December 17, 1820	Samuel Eddy (Providence)	Democratic-Republican (Note: Supported the Adams-Clay faction in the 1824 United States presidential election.)	Elected in 1818. Re-elected in 1820. Re-elected in 1822. Lost re-election.	Nathaniel Hazard (Newport)	Democratic-Republican	Elected in 1818. Lost re-election then died.
16th	December 17, 1820 – March 3, 1821	Samuel Eddy (Providence)	Democratic-Republican	Elected in 1818. Re-elected in 1820. Re-elected in 1822. Lost re-election.	Vacant		
17th	March 4, 1821 – March 3, 1823	Samuel Eddy (Providence)	Democratic-Republican	Elected in 1818. Re-elected in 1820. Re-elected in 1822. Lost re-election.	Job Durfee (Tiverton)	Democratic-Republican	Elected in 1820. Re-elected in 1822. Lost re-election.
18th	March 4, 1823 – March 3, 1825	Samuel Eddy (Providence)	Democratic-Republican	Elected in 1818. Re-elected in 1820. Re-elected in 1822. Lost re-election.	Job Durfee (Tiverton)	Democratic-Republican	Elected in 1820. Re-elected in 1822. Lost re-election.
19th	March 4, 1825 – March 3, 1827	Tristam Burges (Providence)	Anti-Jacksonian	Elected in 1825. Re-elected in 1827. Re-elected in 1829. Re-elected in 1831. Re-elected in 1833. Lost re-election.	Dutee Jerauld Pearce (Newport)	Anti-Jacksonian	Elected in 1825 on the second ballot. Re-elected in 1827. Re-elected in 1829. Re-elected in 1831. Re-elected in 1833. Re-elected in 1835. Lost re-election.
20th	March 4, 1827 – March 3, 1829	Tristam Burges (Providence)	Anti-Jacksonian	Elected in 1825. Re-elected in 1827. Re-elected in 1829. Re-elected in 1831. Re-elected in 1833. Lost re-election.	Dutee Jerauld Pearce (Newport)	Anti-Jacksonian	Elected in 1825 on the second ballot. Re-elected in 1827. Re-elected in 1829. Re-elected in 1831. Re-elected in 1833. Re-elected in 1835. Lost re-election.
21st	March 4, 1829 – March 3, 1831	Tristam Burges (Providence)	Anti-Jacksonian	Elected in 1825. Re-elected in 1827. Re-elected in 1829. Re-elected in 1831. Re-elected in 1833. Lost re-election.	Dutee Jerauld Pearce (Newport)	Anti-Jacksonian	Elected in 1825 on the second ballot. Re-elected in 1827. Re-elected in 1829. Re-elected in 1831. Re-elected in 1833. Re-elected in 1835. Lost re-election.
22nd	March 4, 1831 – March 3, 1833	Tristam Burges (Providence)	Anti-Jacksonian	Elected in 1825. Re-elected in 1827. Re-elected in 1829. Re-elected in 1831. Re-elected in 1833. Lost re-election.	Dutee Jerauld Pearce (Newport)	Anti-Jacksonian	Elected in 1825 on the second ballot. Re-elected in 1827. Re-elected in 1829. Re-elected in 1831. Re-elected in 1833. Re-elected in 1835. Lost re-election.
23rd	March 4, 1833 – March 3, 1835	Tristam Burges (Providence)	Anti-Jacksonian	Elected in 1825. Re-elected in 1827. Re-elected in 1829. Re-elected in 1831. Re-elected in 1833. Lost re-election.	Dutee Jerauld Pearce (Newport)	Anti-Masonic	Elected in 1825 on the second ballot. Re-elected in 1827. Re-elected in 1829. Re-elected in 1831. Re-elected in 1833. Re-elected in 1835. Lost re-election.
24th	March 4, 1835 – March 3, 1837	William Sprague III (Natick)	Whig	Elected in 1835. Retired.	Dutee Jerauld Pearce (Newport)	Anti-Masonic	Elected in 1825 on the second ballot. Re-elected in 1827. Re-elected in 1829. Re-elected in 1831. Re-elected in 1833. Re-elected in 1835. Lost re-election.
25th	March 4, 1837 – March 3, 1839	Robert B. Cranston (Newport)	Whig	Elected in 1837. Re-elected in 1839. Re-elected in 1841. Retired.	Joseph L. Tillinghast (Providence)	Whig	Elected in 1837. Re-elected in 1839. Re-elected in 1841. Retired.
26th	March 4, 1839 – March 3, 1841	Robert B. Cranston (Newport)	Whig	Elected in 1837. Re-elected in 1839. Re-elected in 1841. Retired.	Joseph L. Tillinghast (Providence)	Whig	Elected in 1837. Re-elected in 1839. Re-elected in 1841. Retired.
27th	March 4, 1841 – March 3, 1843	Robert B. Cranston (Newport)	Whig	Elected in 1837. Re-elected in 1839. Re-elected in 1841. Retired.	Joseph L. Tillinghast (Providence)	Whig	Elected in 1837. Re-elected in 1839. Re-elected in 1841. Retired.

== Modern history ==
Many 2020 census projections estimated Rhode Island would lose its second congressional district, bringing the at-large district back into existence. However, this proved not to be the case, and Rhode Island retained its current districts.
