= Elisha Mathewson =

American politician

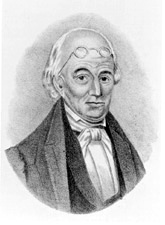

United States Senator from Rhode Island
- In office October 26, 1807 – March 3, 1811
- Preceded by: James Fenner
- Succeeded by: Jeremiah B. Howell

Member of the Rhode Island Senate
- In office 1822

Member of the Rhode Island House of Representatives
- In office 1821

Personal details
- Born: April 18, 1767 Scituate, Rhode Island
- Died: October 14, 1853 (aged 86) Scituate, Rhode Island, U.S.
- Party: Democratic-Republican

Elisha Mathewson (April 18, 1767 – October 14, 1853) was a United States senator from Rhode Island.

== Youth and career ==
Born in Scituate, Rhode Island, Mathewson pursued an academic course and was justice of the peace of Scituate. He engaged in agricultural pursuits and in 1821 was a member of the Rhode Island House of Representatives, and served as speaker during that period. He was a member of the Rhode Island Senate in 1822, and was elected as a Democratic-Republican to the U.S. Senate to fill the vacancy caused by the resignation of James Fenner and served from October 26, 1807, to March 3, 1811.

Mathewson resumed agricultural pursuits and died in Scituate in 1853; interment was on his farm at the north end of Moswansicut Lake, Scituate.

U.S. Senate
Preceded by James Fenner	U.S. senator (Class 2) from Rhode Island; 1807–1811; Served alongside: Benjamin Howland, Francis Malbone, Christopher G. Champlin	Succeeded by Jeremiah B. Howell
Honorary titles
Preceded by David Daggett	Oldest living U.S. senator April 12, 1851 – October 14, 1853	Succeeded by Samuel C. Crafts
Preceded by Henry Clay	Most senior living U.S. senator (Sitting or former); June 29, 1852 – October 14, 1853	Succeeded by Alexander Campbell
