= Jeremiah B. Howell =

American politician

Jeremiah Brown Howell
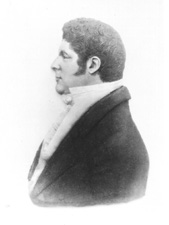

United States Senator from Rhode Island
- In office March 4, 1811 – March 3, 1817
- Preceded by: Elisha Mathewson
- Succeeded by: James Burrill, Jr.

Personal details
- Born: August 28, 1771 Providence, Rhode Island
- Died: February 5, 1822 (aged 50) Providence, Rhode Island, U.S.
- Resting place: North Burial Ground
- Party: Democratic-Republican
- Parent: David Howell (jurist)
- Education: Brown University
- Occupation: Lawyer

Jeremiah Brown Howell (August 28, 1771 – February 5, 1822) was a United States senator from Rhode Island. Born in Providence, he attended private schools, pursued classical studies and graduated from the College of Rhode Island and Providence Plantations (the former name of Brown University) at Providence in 1789. He studied law, was admitted to the bar in 1793 and commenced practice in Providence. He was a brigadier general in the State militia, and was elected as a Democratic-Republican to the U.S. Senate, serving from March 4, 1811, to March 3, 1817. On June 17, 1812, he voted against declaring war against Britain, He was not a candidate for reelection. While in the Senate, he was chairman of the Committee on Pensions (Fourteenth Congress).

Howell died in Providence in 1822; interment was in North Burial Ground.

Howell's father, David Howell, had been a member of the Continental Congress.

U.S. Senate
Preceded by Elisha Mathewson	U.S. senator (Class 2) from Rhode Island; 1811–1817; Served alongside: Christopher G. Champlin, William Hunter	Succeeded by James Burrill, Jr.
