= Francis Malbone =

American politician (1759–1809)

Francis Malbone Jr.
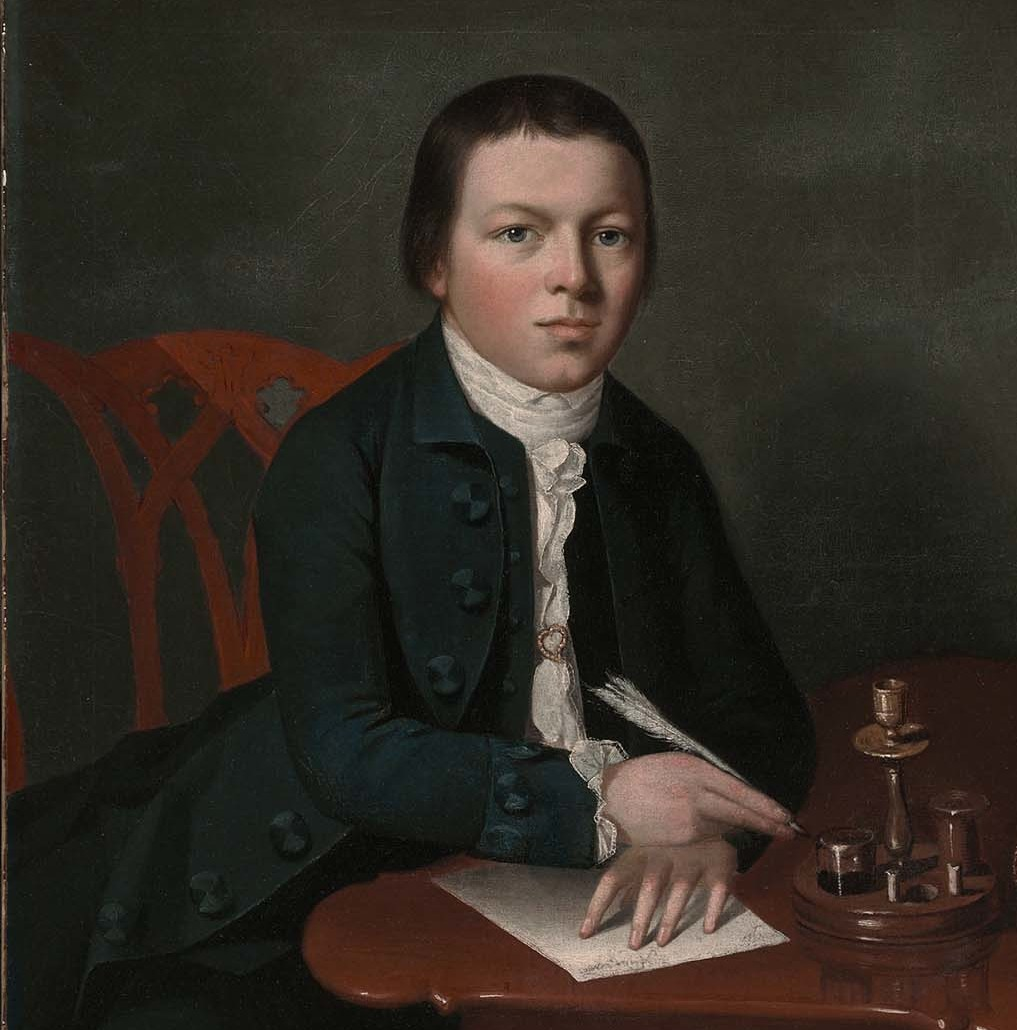

United States Senator from Rhode Island
- In office March 4, 1809 – June 4, 1809
- Preceded by: Benjamin Howland
- Succeeded by: Christopher G. Champlin

Member of the U.S. House of Representatives from Rhode Island's at-large district
- In office March 4, 1793 – March 3, 1797
- Preceded by: Seat added
- Succeeded by: Thomas Tillinghast

Member of the Rhode Island House of Representatives
- In office 1807–1808

Personal details
- Born: March 20, 1759 Newport, Rhode Island Colony, British America
- Died: June 4, 1809 (aged 50) Washington, D.C., U.S.
- Party: Federalist

Francis Malbone Jr. (March 20, 1759 – June 4, 1809) was an American merchant from Newport, Rhode Island. His father, Francis Sr., and his uncle, Evan, were active in the slave trade in Rhode Island. He held the rank of captain in the Rhode Island Militia and served as the commanding officer of the Artillery Company of Newport from 1792 until his death.

He represented Rhode Island in the U.S. House from March 4, 1793, until March 3, 1797, and served briefly as a Federalist in the United States Senate from March 4, 1809, to his death three months later.

He died on the steps of the Capitol building in Washington, D.C., and is buried in the Congressional Cemetery in that city.

== See also ==
- List of members of the United States Congress who died in office (1790–1899)

U.S. Senate
Preceded by Benjamin Howland	U.S. senator (Class 1) from Rhode Island; 1809; Served alongside: Elisha Mathewson	Succeeded by Christopher G. Champlin
U.S. House of Representatives
Preceded by Seat added	Member of the U.S. House of Representatives from Rhode Island's at-large district 1793–1797	Succeeded by Thomas Tillinghast
