= Christopher G. Champlin =

American politician (1768–1840)

Christopher Grant Champlin
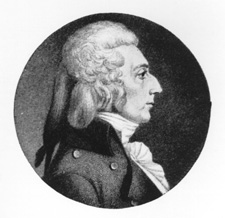

United States Senator from Rhode Island
- In office June 26, 1809 – October 2, 1811
- Preceded by: Francis Malbone
- Succeeded by: William Hunter

Member of the U.S. House of Representatives from Rhode Island's at-large district
- In office March 4, 1797 – March 3, 1801
- Preceded by: Elisha Reynolds Potter
- Succeeded by: Thomas Tillinghast

Personal details
- Born: April 12, 1768 Newport, Rhode Island Colony, British America
- Died: March 18, 1840 (aged 71) Newport, Rhode Island, U.S.
- Resting place: Common Burial Ground
- Party: Federalist
- Education: Harvard College; College of St. Omer

Christopher Grant Champlin (April 12, 1768 – March 18, 1840) was United States Representative, Senator and a slave trader from Rhode Island.

== Biography ==
He was born in Newport in the Colony of Rhode Island and Providence Plantations, the oldest child and only son of the merchant ship owner and Newport slave trader Christopher Champlin (1731–1805), who was also the first Grand Master of Freemasons in Rhode Island from 1791 to 1794.

His uncle George Champlin was a member of the Rhode Island Legislature and also funded slave voyages to Africa; his niece, Elizabeth Mason (daughter of his sister of the same name), married Commodore Oliver Hazard Perry. His great nephew was architect George Champlin Mason Sr. (1820–1894).

After completing preparatory studies, Champlin entered Harvard College, from which he graduated in 1786, then going on to continue his studies at the College of St. Omer in France. On his return, he settled in New York, where he lost a fortune speculating in the stock market with his fathers' proceeds from mercantile business and slave trading. He returned to Newport, was an investor with his father and uncle in at least one slave voyage (the Brig Elizabeth), and married Martha Redwood Ellery (b. 1772) (a niece of Continental Congressman and signer of the Declaration of Independence William Ellery), in 1793. They had one child, a son Christopher Champlin V [1794-Jan 1811] (Yale class of 1810) who died young. For several years after his marriage, Champlin worked as an assistant to his father in the shipping business.

In 1796, Champlin decided to run for Congress. To strengthen his chances, he swore that he had not speculated in southern real estate and that he would not use a congressional position to further his own investments. However, it was later revealed that he had lied about his southern land interests, as he had speculated heavily in the Tennessee Company with a college friend. In any case, Champlin was elected as a Federalist to the Fifth and Sixth Congresses (March 4, 1797 – March 3, 1801). During this period, he took part in a duel with a Delaware congressman, James A. Bayard. He continued to engage in mercantile pursuits, and was later elected to the U.S. Senate to fill the vacancy caused by the death of Francis Malbone and served from June 26, 1809, until October 2, 1811, when he resigned and returned to Rhode Island. Champlin was elected a member of the American Antiquarian Society in 1814.

Champlin served as commanding officer (with rank of colonel) of the Newport Artillery Company from April 1815 to April 1818. He commanded the company when it responded to the 1815 New England hurricane, also known as the Great Gale of 1815. As a measure of their gratitude, the Newport town council made the following resolution: "Voted and resolved that the thanks of the town Council be presented to Colonel C. G. Champlin and the officers and privates of the Artillery Company of the town of Newport under his command for the prompt attention they paid to the request of said town council to turn out and guard the property of the unfortunate sufferers in the late destructive storm, and for their good conduct while on duty."

He attended Newport's Congregationalist Church. Champlin was president of the Rhode Island Bank until a short time before his death in Newport in 1840; interment was in Common Burial Ground.

U.S. Senate
Preceded by Francis Malbone	U.S. senator (Class 1) from Rhode Island; 1809–1811; Served alongside: Elisha Mathewson, Jeremiah B. Howell	Succeeded by William Hunter
U.S. House of Representatives
Preceded by Elisha Reynolds Potter	Member of the U.S. House of Representatives from Rhode Island's at-large district 1797–1801	Succeeded by Thomas Tillinghast
