= Benjamin Howland =

American politician (1755–1821)

United States Senator from Rhode Island
- In office October 29, 1804 – March 3, 1809
- Preceded by: Samuel J. Potter
- Succeeded by: Francis Malbone

Member of the Rhode Island House of Representatives
- In office 1810

Personal details
- Born: July 27, 1755 Tiverton, Rhode Island
- Died: May 1, 1821 (aged 65) Tiverton, Rhode Island
- Party: Democratic-Republican

Benjamin Howland (July 27, 1755 – May 1, 1821) was a United States senator from Rhode Island. Born in Tiverton, he attended the common schools, engaged in agricultural pursuits, was collector of taxes in 1801, town auditor in 1802, and town moderator in 1805. He was a member of the Rhode Island House of Representatives in 1810 and a general in the State militia during the War of 1812.

Howland was elected as a Democratic-Republican to the U.S. Senate to fill the vacancy caused by the death of Samuel J. Potter and served from October 29, 1804, until March 3, 1809. He died in Tiverton in 1821; interment was in the family lot on his estate.

U.S. Senate
Preceded by Samuel J. Potter	U.S. senator (Class 1) from Rhode Island; 1804–1809; Served alongside: Christopher Ellery, James Fenner, Elisha Mathewson	Succeeded by Francis Malbone
