= Dutee J. Pearce =

American politician

Dutee Jerauld Pearce

Member of the U.S. House of Representatives from Rhode Island's At-large district
- In office March 4, 1825 – March 3, 1837
- Preceded by: Charles H. Page
- Succeeded by: James M. Pendleton

Member of the Rhode Island House of Representatives

Personal details
- Born: April 3, 1789 Prudence Island, Rhode Island
- Died: May 9, 1849 (aged 60) Newport; Rhode Island, U.S.
- Resting place: Common Burial Ground; Providence Rhode Island
- Party: Adams Party; Jacksonian Party; Anti-Masonic Party
- Spouse(s): Abigail Coggershall Pearce; Harriet Boss Pearce
- Children: Samuel Pearce; Hannah Jerould Pearce; Abby Perry Pearce; Abigail Pearce; Ann Townsend Pearce; Catherine P Pearce; Dutee J Pearce; Dutee Jerauld Pearce; Harriet Boss Pearce
- Parent(s): Samuel Pearce; Hannah Jerauld Pearce
- Education: Brown University; Providence, Rhode Island
- Profession: Lawyer; Politician

Dutee Jerauld Pearce (April 3, 1789 – May 9, 1849) was an American politician and a United States Representative from Rhode Island.

== Early life ==
Born on Prudence Island, Pearce graduated from Brown University, Providence, Rhode Island in 1808, and was a member of Phi Beta Kappa. He studied law and was admitted to the bar and commenced practice in Newport, Rhode Island.

== Career ==
Pearce held various local offices including Attorney general of Rhode Island in 1819–1825 and United States district attorney in 1824 and 1825. He served as member of the Rhode Island House of Representatives.

Pearce was elected as an Adams candidate to the Nineteenth and Twentieth Congresses; as an Anti-Jacksonian to the Twenty-first and Twenty-second Congresses; and as an Anti-Masonic candidate to the Twenty-third and Twenty-fourth Congresses. He served in the United States House of Representatives from March 4, 1825, to March 3, 1837. He was chairman of the Committee on Revisal and Unfinished Business (Twentieth and Twenty-first Congresses).

An unsuccessful candidate for re-election in 1836 to the Twenty-fifth Congress, Pearce resumed his practice.

Pearce participated in the so-called Dorr Rebellion of 1842-43 which was an effort to extend suffrage in Rhode Island which had been limited to landowning men holding $134 or more in property. Thomas Dorr and followers organized a People's Convention in 1841 to draft a new constitution featuring universal male suffrage. When black residents asked that blacks be included in the proposed constitution, Dorr and others agreed. However Newport delegate Pearce argued that including black suffrage would alienate subsequent wider white support needed to adopt the proposed constitution. The convention then voted 46 to 18 to limit suffrage to white men.

In 1842 after the existing state government rejected the results of the convention and a popular vote in favor of the new constitution, Pearce and others were accused of treason after an attempt by Dorrites to capture the Providence armory. Pearce then sought assistance in his defense from Congressman and former President John Quincy Adams. In following months, abolitionists succeeded in eliminating the word white in the proposed new constitution which was then adopted in an overwhelming referendum, proving Pearce wrong.

== Death ==
Pearce died in Newport on May 9, 1849 (age 60 years, 36 days). He is interred in the Common Burial Ground, Providence, Rhode Island.

== Family life ==
Son of Samuel and Hannah Jerauld Pearce, he married Abigail Coggershall and they had seven children: Samuel, Hannah Jerould, Abby Perry, Abigail, Ann Townsend, Catherine P, and Dutee J Pearce. After the death of his wife on July 4, 1827, Pearce married Harriet Boss and had two children, Dutee Jerauld and Harriet Boss Pearce.

U.S. House of Representatives
Preceded by Job Durfee	Member of the U.S. House of Representatives from Rhode Island's at-large district 1825–1837	Succeeded by Joseph L. Tillinghast
