= William Hunter (senator) =

American politician and diplomat (1774–1849)

William Hunter Jr.
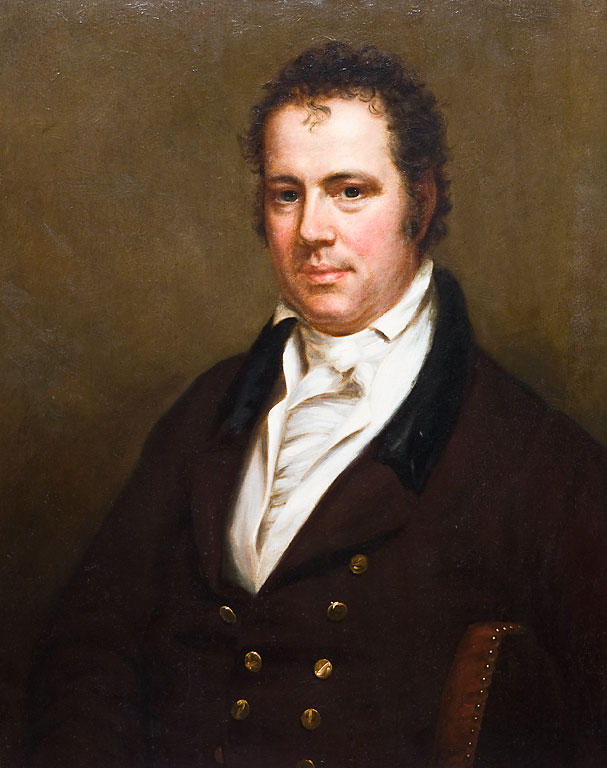
- Portrait by Charles Bird King, 1824

1st United States Minister to Brazil
- In office January 1, 1842 – December 9, 1843
- President: John Tyler
- Preceded by: Himself (as Chargé d'Affaires)
- Succeeded by: George H. Proffit

4th United States Chargé d'Affaires to Brazil
- In office January 7, 1835 – January 1, 1842
- President: Andrew Jackson; Martin Van Buren; William Henry Harrison; John Tyler
- Preceded by: Ethan Allen Brown
- Succeeded by: Himself (as Minister)

United States Senator from Rhode Island
- In office October 28, 1811 – March 3, 1821
- Preceded by: Christopher G. Champlin
- Succeeded by: James De Wolf

Member of the Rhode Island House of Representatives
- In office 1823–1825; 1799–1812

Personal details
- Born: November 26, 1774 Newport, Rhode Island
- Died: December 3, 1849 (aged 75) Newport, Rhode Island
- Resting place: Trinity Church Graveyard
- Party: Federalist
- Education: Rhode Island College
- Occupation: Lawyer, diplomat

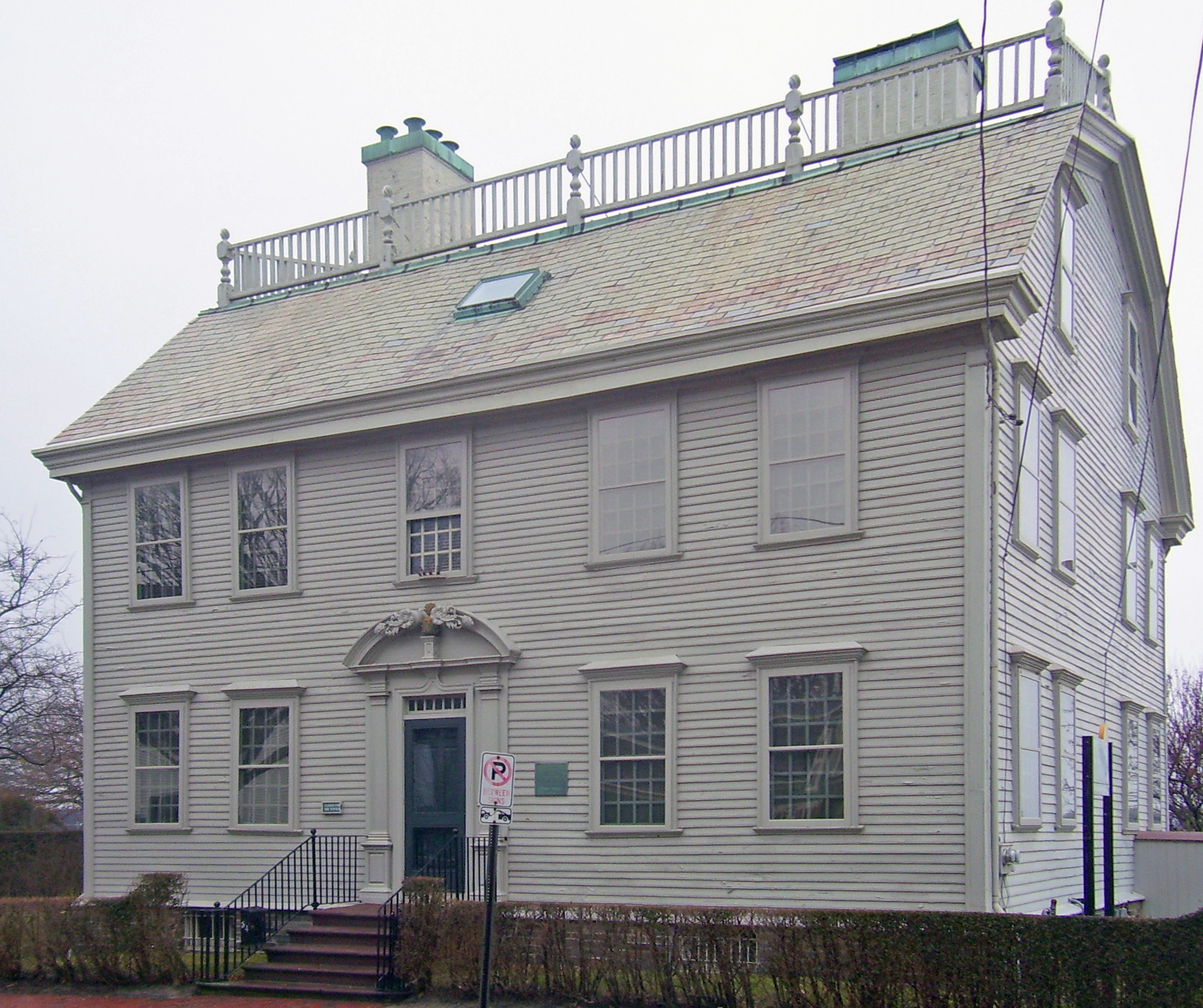
Hunter's House in Newport

William Hunter Jr. (November 26, 1774 – December 3, 1849) was an American politician and diplomat and owner of the Hunter House, now a museum.

== Life and career ==
Hunter was born in Newport, Rhode Island, as the youngest son of seven children of Debora Malbone Hunter and Dr. William Hunter, a prominent Newport doctor, scholar and merchant. He attended the Rogers School and graduated from the College of Rhode Island and Providence Plantations (the former name of Brown University) at Providence in 1791. In 1791 he went to England to study medicine, but when he arrived there he changed his mind and studied law. He returned to the United States in 1793 and established a law practice in Newport. He was a member of the Rhode Island General Assembly from 1799 to 1812, a member of the United States Senate from Rhode Island from 1811 to 1821, and a member of the Rhode Island House of Representatives from 1823 to 1825. Hunter had been elected by the state legislature to the United States Senate in 1811 after a senator resigned, and elected to a full term in 1814. On June 17, 1812, he was one of 13 senators who voted against declaring war against Britain. He was a member of the United States Federalist Party in the Senate, and served as chairman of the Commerce Committee from 1815 to 1817.

Hunter was elected a member of the American Antiquarian Society in 1815.

He was a member of the Artillery Company of Newport, a militia unit to which many of Newport's leading citizens belonged.

After leaving the Senate, Hunter continued to practice law in Newport. In 1836, he was appointed by President Andrew Jackson to be the United States representative to Brazil. He served in this position for 9 years, through multiple presidents, until 1845, and then returned to Newport, where he died four years later. Hunter is buried in the Trinity Church graveyard.

Information about his political beliefs and activities while in the Senate is not easily available. One opinion that he is known for is that he believed that the state of Massachusetts was exaggerating its role in the Revolutionary War.

== See also ==
- List of United States political appointments that crossed party lines

U.S. Senate
Preceded by Christopher G. Champlin	U.S. senator (Class 1) from Rhode Island; 1811–1821; Served alongside: Jeremiah B. Howell, James Burrill, Jr., Nehemiah R. Knight	Succeeded by James De Wolf
Diplomatic posts
Preceded by Ethan Allen Brown	United States Chargé d'Affaires, Brazil; 7 January 1835 – 1 January 1842	Promoted to Envoy Extraordinary and Minister Plenipotentiary
Promoted from Chargé d'Affaires	United States Minister to Brazil; January 1, 1842 – December 9, 1843	Succeeded by George H. Proffit
