= Elisha Reynolds Potter =

American politician (1764–1835)

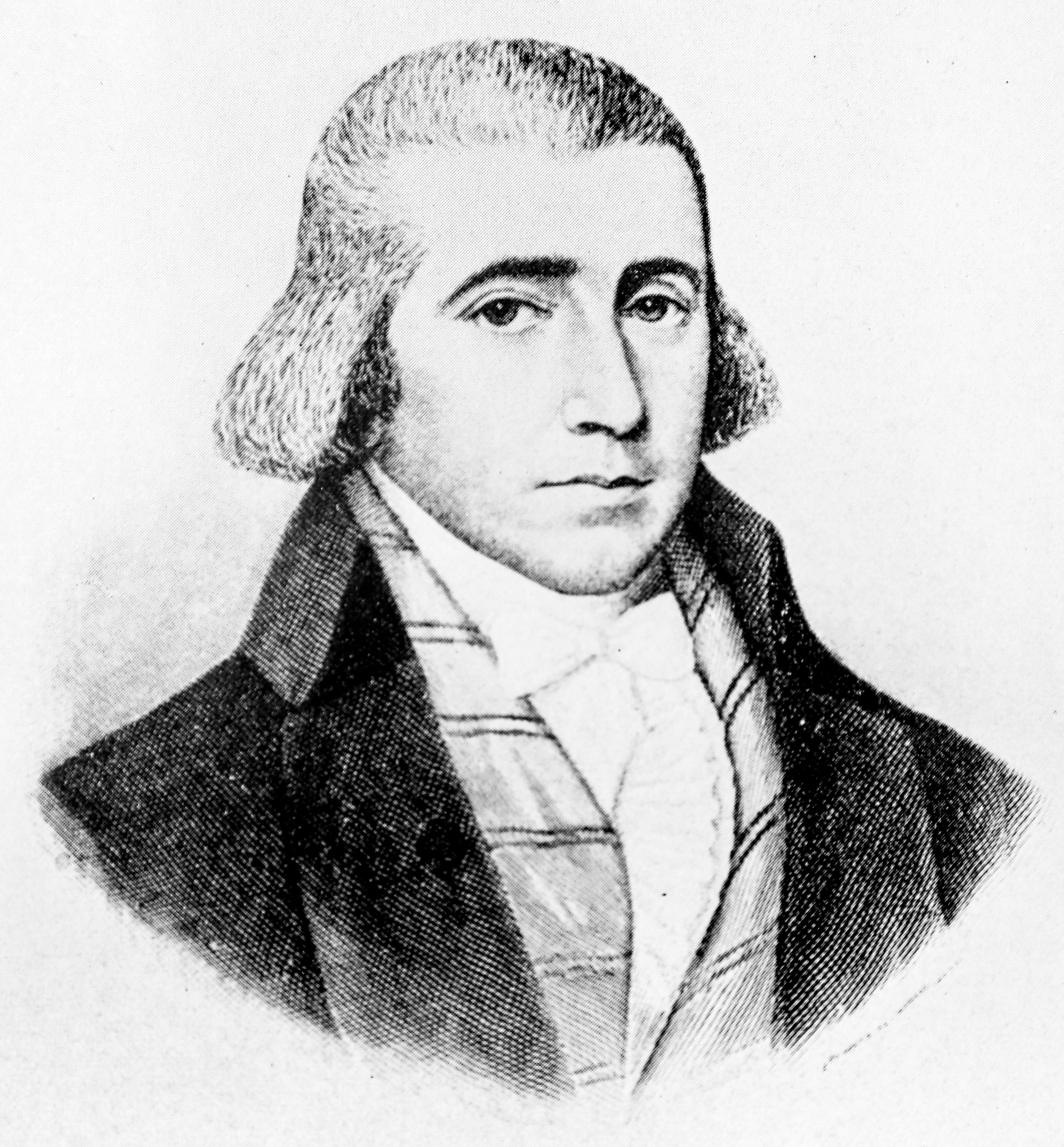

Member of the U.S. House of Representatives from Rhode Island's at-large district
- In office November 15, 1796 – 1797
- Preceded by: Benjamin Bourne
- Succeeded by: Christopher G. Champlin

Member of the U.S. House of Representatives from Rhode Island's at-large district
- In office March 4, 1809 – March 3, 1815
- Preceded by: Isaac Wilbour
- Succeeded by: James Brown Mason

Personal details
- Born: November 5, 1764 Little Rest, Rhode Island Colony, British America
- Died: September 26, 1835 (aged 70) South Kingstown, Rhode Island, U.S.
- Resting place: Colonel Thomas Potter Cemetery
- Party: Federalist
- Spouse: Mary Potter
- Children: Elisha R. Potter
- Occupation: Lawyer

Elisha Reynolds Potter (November 5, 1764 – September 26, 1835) was a statesman in the Federalist Party from Kingston, Rhode Island, who served several times as the Speaker in the Rhode Island State Assembly.

== Early life ==
Potter was born in Little Rest (now known as Kingston) in the Colony of Rhode Island and Providence Plantations on November 5, 1764, and he resided there for all of his life, residing in the Elisha Reynolds House. He was the son of Thomas Potter and Elizabeth (née Reynolds) Potter. His maternal grandparents were Elisha Reynolds and Susannah (née Potter) Reynolds and his paternal grandparents were Ichabod Potter and Margaret (née Helme) Potter.

He received a formal education at Plainfield Academy, and law instruction under Matthew Robinson.

== Career ==
He began his career as a blacksmith's apprentice, but switched to the law in 1793. Potter was said to be a very large man; when he traveled by stagecoach, he had to purchase two seats.

Potter ran against Peleg Arnold in a special election for the U.S. House of Representatives in 1796 caused by Benjamin Bourne's resignation, and Potter won the election. He served as a United States Congressman from 1796 to 1797 and again from 1809 to 1815.

He was elected a member of the American Antiquarian Society in 1815.

Potter ran for governor of Rhode Island in 1818, but lost to Nehemiah R. Knight.

== Personal life ==
Potter was twice married and his first wife was Mary (née Gardiner) Perkins (1754–1809), daughter of Caleb Gardiner and widow of merchant Joseph Perkins in 1790. After the death of his first wife in 1809, he married her 31-year-old niece, Mary Mawney (1779–1835), in 1810. His second wife was the daughter of Pardon Mawney. Together, Elisha and his second wife were the parents of five surviving children, including:

- Elisha Reynolds Potter Jr. (1811–1882), who was also a Congressman.
- Thomas Mawney Potter (1814–1890), who married Loes Martin.
- William Henry Potter (1816–1908), who married Sarah Corlis (née Whipple) Swann in 1857.
- James Brown Mason Potter (1818–1900), who married Eliza Palmer in 1849.
- Mary Elizabeth Potter (1820–1901)

His second wife died in July, 1835 at the house of her brother-in-law, Jeffery Davis. Potter died on September 26, 1835, and is buried in Colonel Thomas Potter Cemetery near Kingston, Rhode Island.

== See also ==
- Tavern Hall Preservation Society

Party political offices
Preceded by William Jones	Federalist nominee for Governor of Rhode Island; 1818	Vacant Title next held by Samuel W. Bridgham
U.S. House of Representatives
Preceded by Benjamin Bourne	Member of the U.S. House of Representatives from Rhode Island's at-large district 1796—1797	Succeeded by Christopher G. Champlin
Preceded by Isaac Wilbour	Member of the U.S. House of Representatives from Rhode Island's at-large district 1809—1815	Succeeded by James B. Mason
