= Thomas Tillinghast =

American judge

Member of the U.S. House of Representatives from Rhode Island's at-large congressional district
- In office November 13, 1797 – March 3, 1799
- Preceded by: Francis Malbone
- Succeeded by: John Brown (Rhode Island politician)

Member of the U.S. House of Representatives from Rhode Island's at-large congressional district
- In office March 4, 1801 – March 3, 1803
- Preceded by: Christopher G. Champlin
- Succeeded by: Nehemiah Knight

Personal details
- Born: August 21, 1742 East Greenwich, Rhode Island Colony, British America
- Died: August 26, 1821 (aged 79) East Greenwich, Rhode Island, U.S.

Thomas Tillinghast (August 21, 1742 – August 26, 1821) was a United States representative from Rhode Island. Born in East Greenwich in the Colony of Rhode Island and Providence Plantations, Tillinghast was elected as a member of the Rhode Island House of Representatives and served from 1772 to 1773. He held several offices under the Revolutionary authorities and again served in the Rhode Island House of Representatives from 1778 to 1780. He was a judge of the Court of Common Pleas in 1779. He was a member of the council of war. He served as an associate justice of the Rhode Island Supreme Court from May 1781 to May 1787, and again from May 1791 until his resignation in December 1797.

He was a great-grandson of Rev. Pardon Tillinghast (1622–1718)

Tillinghast was elected as a Federalist to the Fifth Congress to fill the vacancy caused by the resignation of Francis Malbone and served from November 13, 1797, to March 3, 1799. He was again elected as a Democratic-Republican to the Seventh Congress and served from March 4, 1801, to March 3, 1803.

Tillinghast died in East Greenwich, Rhode Island on August 26, 1821. Interment was in Tillinghast Lot (Rhode Island Historical Cemetery East Greenwich #18) located on South County Road, East Greenwich.

U.S. House of Representatives
Preceded by Francis Malbone	Member of the U.S. House of Representatives from Rhode Island's at-large congressional district November 13, 1797 – March 3, 1799	Succeeded by John Brown
Preceded by Christopher G. Champlin	Member of the U.S. House of Representatives from Rhode Island's at-large congressional district March 4, 1801 – March 3, 1803	Succeeded by Nehemiah Knight
