= Nehemiah Knight =

United States Representative from Rhode Island

Member of the U.S. House of Representatives from Rhode Island's at-large district
- In office March 4, 1803 – June 13, 1808
- Preceded by: Thomas Tillinghast
- Succeeded by: Richard Jackson, Jr.

Personal details
- Born: March 23, 1746 Cranston, Rhode Island Colony, British America
- Died: June 13, 1808 (aged 62) Cranston, Rhode Island, U.S.
- Party: Democratic-Republican
- Children: Nehemiah R. Knight

Nehemiah Knight (March 23, 1746 – June 13, 1808) was a United States representative from Rhode Island. He was born in Knightsville (a village later named after him) within the town of Cranston in the Colony of Rhode Island and Providence Plantations. He attended the common schools, engaged in agricultural pursuits, and was town clerk from 1773 to 1800. In 1783 and 1787 he was elected to the Rhode Island General Assembly, and was sheriff of Providence County in 1787.

Knight was elected as a Democratic-Republican to the Eighth, Ninth, and Tenth Congresses and served from March 4, 1803, until his death in Cranston in 1808; interment was in a small family cemetery now known as Cranston Historical Cemetery, number 21 in between 1757 and 1761 Cranston Street South of Phenix Avenue in the center of "Knightsville", Cranston, which is named for the family.

Nehemiah was married in 1762 to Eleanor Rice Hudson (1746–1823). Their son, Nehemiah Rice Knight (1780–1854), would later become the Governor of Rhode Island and even later a U.S. Senator.

== See also ==
- List of members of the United States Congress who died in office (1790–1899)
- Knightsville, Rhode Island

U.S. House of Representatives
Preceded by Thomas Tillinghast	Member of the U.S. House of Representatives from Rhode Island's at-large district 1803–1808	Succeeded by Richard Jackson, Jr.
