= Richard Jackson Jr. =

American politician

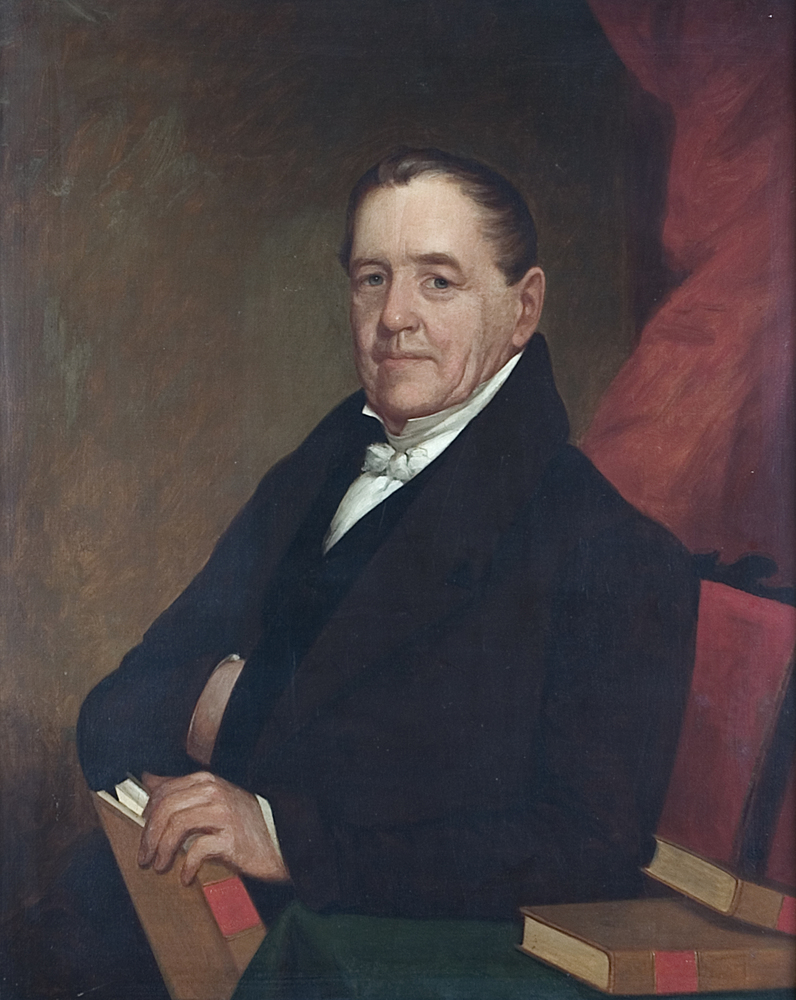

Member of the U.S. House of Representatives from Rhode Island's at-large district
- In office November 11, 1808 – March 4, 1815
- Preceded by: Nehemiah Knight
- Succeeded by: John Linscom Boss Jr.

Personal details
- Born: July 3, 1764 Providence, Rhode Island Colony, British America
- Died: April 18, 1838 (aged 73) Providence, Rhode Island, U.S.
- Party: Federalist

Richard Jackson Jr. (July 3, 1764 – April 18, 1838) was a U.S. representative from Rhode Island.

Born in Providence in the Colony of Rhode Island and Providence Plantations, Jackson completed preparatory studies in the schools of Providence and Pomfret, Connecticut. He entered the mercantile and cotton manufacturing businesses. He served as president of the Washington Insurance Co., Providence, Rhode Island from 1800 to 1838.

Jackson was elected as a Federalist to the Tenth Congress to fill the vacancy caused by the death of Nehemiah Knight. He was reelected to the Eleventh, Twelfth, and Thirteenth Congresses and served from November 11, 1808, to March 3, 1815. He was not a candidate for renomination in 1814. Jackson served on the board of trustees of Brown University from 1809 to 1838. He was elected a member of the American Antiquarian Society in 1815. He died in Providence, Rhode Island, on April 18, 1838.

Party political offices
| Vacant Title last held by Seth Wheaton | Federalist nominee for Governor of Rhode Island; 1806 | Succeeded by Seth Wheaton |
U.S. House of Representatives
| Preceded by Nehemiah Knight | Member of the U.S. House of Representatives from Rhode Island's at-large district 1808–1815 | Succeeded by John Linscom Boss Jr. |
