= Rhode Island's congressional delegations =

Map of Rhode Island's two congressional districts for the United States House of Representatives since 2022.

These are tables of congressional delegations from Rhode Island to the United States Senate and United States House of Representatives.

The current dean of the Rhode Island delegation is Senator Jack Reed, having served in the Senate since 1997 and in Congress since 1991.

== Current delegation ==
Current U.S. senators from Rhode Island
Rhode Island CPVI (2025): D+8	Class I senator	Class II senator
Rhode Island CPVI (2025): D+8	Sheldon Whitehouse (Junior senator) (Newport)	Jack Reed (Senior senator) (Jamestown)
Party	Democratic	Democratic
Incumbent since	January 3, 2007	January 3, 1997

Current U.S. representatives from Rhode Island
District	Member (Residence)	Party	Incumbent since	CPVI (2025)	District map
1st	Gabe Amo (Providence)	Democratic	November 7, 2023	D+12	
2nd	Seth Magaziner (Cranston)	Democratic	January 3, 2023	D+4	

== United States Senate ==
Class I senator	Congress	Class II senator
Theodore Foster (PA)	1st (1790–1791)	Joseph Stanton Jr. (AA)
Theodore Foster (PA)	2nd (1791–1793)	Joseph Stanton Jr. (AA)
Theodore Foster (PA)	3rd (1793–1795)	William Bradford (PA)
Theodore Foster (F)	4th (1795–1797)	William Bradford (F)
Theodore Foster (F)	5th (1797–1799)	William Bradford (F)
Theodore Foster (F)	5th (1797–1799)	Ray Greene (F)
Theodore Foster (F)	6th (1799–1801)	Ray Greene (F)
Theodore Foster (F)	7th (1801–1803)	Ray Greene (F)
Theodore Foster (F)	7th (1801–1803)	Christopher Ellery (DR)
Samuel J. Potter (DR) (Note: Senator Potter died on September 26, 1804, while in office.)	8th (1803–1805)	Christopher Ellery (DR)
Benjamin Howland (DR)	8th (1803–1805)	Christopher Ellery (DR)
Benjamin Howland (DR)	9th (1805–1807)	James Fenner (DR)
Benjamin Howland (DR)	10th (1807–1809)	James Fenner (DR)
Benjamin Howland (DR)	10th (1807–1809)	Elisha Mathewson (DR)
Francis Malbone (F)	11th (1809–1811)	Elisha Mathewson (DR)
Christopher G. Champlin (F)	11th (1809–1811)	Elisha Mathewson (DR)
Christopher G. Champlin (F)	12th (1811–1813)	Jeremiah B. Howell (DR)
William Hunter (F)	12th (1811–1813)	Jeremiah B. Howell (DR)
William Hunter (F)	13th (1813–1815)	Jeremiah B. Howell (DR)
William Hunter (F)	14th (1815–1817)	Jeremiah B. Howell (DR)
William Hunter (F)	15th (1817–1819)	James Burrill Jr. (F)
William Hunter (F)	16th (1819–1821)	James Burrill Jr. (F)
William Hunter (F)	16th (1819–1821)	Nehemiah R. Knight (DR)
James DeWolf (DR)	17th (1821–1823)	Nehemiah R. Knight (DR)
James DeWolf (DR)	18th (1823–1825)	Nehemiah R. Knight (DR)
James DeWolf (NR)	19th (1825–1827)	Nehemiah R. Knight (NR)
Asher Robbins (NR)	19th (1825–1827)	Nehemiah R. Knight (NR)
Asher Robbins (NR)	20th (1827–1829)	Nehemiah R. Knight (NR)
Asher Robbins (NR)	21st (1829–1831)	Nehemiah R. Knight (NR)
Asher Robbins (NR)	22nd (1831–1833)	Nehemiah R. Knight (NR)
Asher Robbins (NR)	23rd (1833–1835)	Nehemiah R. Knight (NR)
Asher Robbins (NR)	24th (1835–1837)	Nehemiah R. Knight (NR)
Asher Robbins (W)	25th (1837–1839)	Nehemiah R. Knight (W)
Nathan F. Dixon I (W)	26th (1839–1841)	Nehemiah R. Knight (W)
Nathan F. Dixon I (W)	27th (1841–1843)	James F. Simmons (W)
William Sprague III (W)	27th (1841–1843)	James F. Simmons (W)
William Sprague III (W)	28th (1843–1845)	James F. Simmons (W)
John Brown Francis (LO)	28th (1843–1845)	James F. Simmons (W)
Albert C. Greene (W)	29th (1845–1847)	James F. Simmons (W)
Albert C. Greene (W)	30th (1847–1849)	John H. Clarke (W)
Albert C. Greene (W)	31st (1849–1851)	John H. Clarke (W)
Charles Tillinghast; James (D)	32nd (1851–1853)	John H. Clarke (W)
Charles Tillinghast; James (D)	33rd (1853–1855)	Philip Allen (D)
Charles Tillinghast; James (D)	34th (1855–1857)	Philip Allen (D)
James F. Simmons (R)	35th (1857–1859)	Philip Allen (D)
James F. Simmons (R)	36th (1859–1861)	Henry B. Anthony (R)
James F. Simmons (R)	37th (1861–1863)	Henry B. Anthony (R)
Samuel G. Arnold (R)	37th (1861–1863)	Henry B. Anthony (R)
William Sprague IV (R)	38th (1863–1865)	Henry B. Anthony (R)
William Sprague IV (R)	39th (1865–1867)	Henry B. Anthony (R)
William Sprague IV (R)	40th (1867–1869)	Henry B. Anthony (R)
William Sprague IV (R)	41st (1869–1871)	Henry B. Anthony (R)
William Sprague IV (R)	42nd (1871–1873)	Henry B. Anthony (R)
William Sprague IV (R)	43rd (1873–1875)	Henry B. Anthony (R)
Ambrose Burnside (R) (Note: Senator Burnside died on September 13, 1881, while in office.)	44th (1875–1877)	Henry B. Anthony (R)
Ambrose Burnside (R)	45th (1877–1879)	Henry B. Anthony (R)
Ambrose Burnside (R)	46th (1879–1881)	Henry B. Anthony (R)
Ambrose Burnside (R)	47th (1881–1883)	Henry B. Anthony (R)
Nelson W. Aldrich (R)	47th (1881–1883)	Henry B. Anthony (R)
Nelson W. Aldrich (R)	48th (1883–1885)	Henry B. Anthony (R)
Nelson W. Aldrich (R)	48th (1883–1885)	William P. Sheffield Sr. (R)
Nelson W. Aldrich (R)	48th (1883–1885)	Jonathan Chace (R) (Note: Senator Chace resigned from office on March 16, 1889.)
Nelson W. Aldrich (R)	49th (1885–1887)	Jonathan Chace (R)
Nelson W. Aldrich (R)	50th (1887–1889)	Jonathan Chace (R)
Nelson W. Aldrich (R)	51st (1889–1891)	Jonathan Chace (R)
Nelson W. Aldrich (R)	51st (1889–1891)	Nathan F. Dixon III (R)
Nelson W. Aldrich (R)	52nd (1891–1893)	Nathan F. Dixon III (R)
Nelson W. Aldrich (R)	53rd (1893–1895)	Nathan F. Dixon III (R)
Nelson W. Aldrich (R)	54th (1895–1897)	George P. Wetmore (R)
Nelson W. Aldrich (R)	55th (1897–1899)	George P. Wetmore (R)
Nelson W. Aldrich (R)	56th (1899–1901)	George P. Wetmore (R)
Nelson W. Aldrich (R)	57th (1901–1903)	George P. Wetmore (R)
Nelson W. Aldrich (R)	58th (1903–1905)	George P. Wetmore (R)
Nelson W. Aldrich (R)	59th (1905–1907)	George P. Wetmore (R)
Nelson W. Aldrich (R)	60th (1907–1909)	vacant
Nelson W. Aldrich (R)	60th (1907–1909)	George P. Wetmore (R)
Nelson W. Aldrich (R)	61st (1909–1911)	George P. Wetmore (R)
Henry F. Lippitt (R)	62nd (1911–1913)	George P. Wetmore (R)
Henry F. Lippitt (R)	63rd (1913–1915)	LeBaron B. Colt (R) (Note: Senator Colt died on August 18, 1924, while in office.)
Henry F. Lippitt (R)	64th (1915–1917)	LeBaron B. Colt (R)
Peter G. Gerry (D)	65th (1917–1919)	LeBaron B. Colt (R)
Peter G. Gerry (D)	66th (1919–1921)	LeBaron B. Colt (R)
Peter G. Gerry (D)	67th (1921–1923)	LeBaron B. Colt (R)
Peter G. Gerry (D)	68th (1923–1925)	LeBaron B. Colt (R)
Peter G. Gerry (D)	68th (1923–1925)	Jesse H. Metcalf (R)
Peter G. Gerry (D)	69th (1925–1927)	Jesse H. Metcalf (R)
Peter G. Gerry (D)	70th (1927–1929)	Jesse H. Metcalf (R)
Felix Hebert (R)	71st (1929–1931)	Jesse H. Metcalf (R)
Felix Hebert (R)	72nd (1931–1933)	Jesse H. Metcalf (R)
Felix Hebert (R)	73rd (1933–1935)	Jesse H. Metcalf (R)
Peter G. Gerry (D)	74th (1935–1937)	Jesse H. Metcalf (R)
Peter G. Gerry (D)	75th (1937–1939)	Theodore F. Green (D)
Peter G. Gerry (D)	76th (1939–1941)	Theodore F. Green (D)
Peter G. Gerry (D)	77th (1941–1943)	Theodore F. Green (D)
Peter G. Gerry (D)	78th (1943–1945)	Theodore F. Green (D)
Peter G. Gerry (D)	79th (1945–1947)	Theodore F. Green (D)
J. Howard McGrath (D)	80th (1947–1949)	Theodore F. Green (D)
J. Howard McGrath (D)	81st (1949–1951)	Theodore F. Green (D)
Edward L. Leahy (D)	81st (1949–1951)	Theodore F. Green (D)
John Pastore (D)	81st (1949–1951)	Theodore F. Green (D)
John Pastore (D)	82nd (1951–1953)	Theodore F. Green (D)
John Pastore (D)	83rd (1953–1955)	Theodore F. Green (D)
John Pastore (D)	84th (1955–1957)	Theodore F. Green (D)
John Pastore (D)	85th (1957–1959)	Theodore F. Green (D)
John Pastore (D)	86th (1959–1961)	Theodore F. Green (D)
John Pastore (D)	87th (1961–1963)	Claiborne Pell (D)
John Pastore (D)	88th (1963–1965)	Claiborne Pell (D)
John Pastore (D)	89th (1965–1967)	Claiborne Pell (D)
John Pastore (D)	90th (1967–1969)	Claiborne Pell (D)
John Pastore (D)	91st (1969–1971)	Claiborne Pell (D)
John Pastore (D)	92nd (1971–1973)	Claiborne Pell (D)
John Pastore (D)	93rd (1973–1975)	Claiborne Pell (D)
John Pastore (D)	94th (1975–1977)	Claiborne Pell (D)
John Chafee (R) (Note: Senator Chafee died on October 24, 1999, while in office.)	94th (1975–1977)	Claiborne Pell (D)
John Chafee (R)	95th (1977–1979)	Claiborne Pell (D)
John Chafee (R)	96th (1979–1981)	Claiborne Pell (D)
John Chafee (R)	97th (1981–1983)	Claiborne Pell (D)
John Chafee (R)	98th (1983–1985)	Claiborne Pell (D)
John Chafee (R)	99th (1985–1987)	Claiborne Pell (D)
John Chafee (R)	100th (1987–1989)	Claiborne Pell (D)
John Chafee (R)	101st (1989–1991)	Claiborne Pell (D)
John Chafee (R)	102nd (1991–1993)	Claiborne Pell (D)
John Chafee (R)	103rd (1993–1995)	Claiborne Pell (D)
John Chafee (R)	104th (1995–1997)	Claiborne Pell (D)
John Chafee (R)	105th (1997–1999)	Jack Reed (D)
John Chafee (R)	106th (1999–2001)	Jack Reed (D)
Lincoln Chafee (R)	106th (1999–2001)	Jack Reed (D)
Lincoln Chafee (R)	107th (2001–2003)	Jack Reed (D)
Lincoln Chafee (R)	108th (2003–2005)	Jack Reed (D)
Lincoln Chafee (R)	109th (2005–2007)	Jack Reed (D)
Sheldon Whitehouse (D)	110th (2007–2009)	Jack Reed (D)
Sheldon Whitehouse (D)	111th (2009–2011)	Jack Reed (D)
Sheldon Whitehouse (D)	112th (2011–2013)	Jack Reed (D)
Sheldon Whitehouse (D)	113th (2013–2015)	Jack Reed (D)
Sheldon Whitehouse (D)	114th (2015–2017)	Jack Reed (D)
Sheldon Whitehouse (D)	115th (2017–2019)	Jack Reed (D)
Sheldon Whitehouse (D)	116th (2019–2021)	Jack Reed (D)
Sheldon Whitehouse (D)	117th (2021–2023)	Jack Reed (D)
Sheldon Whitehouse (D)	118th (2023–2025)	Jack Reed (D)
Sheldon Whitehouse (D)	119th (2025–2027)	Jack Reed (D)
Sheldon Whitehouse (D)	120th (2027–2029)	Jack Reed (D)

== U.S. House of Representatives ==
=== 1790–1843: At-large seat(s) ===
When Rhode Island ratified the Constitution in 1790, it had one seat. After the first census, it had two seats, chosen at-large on a general ticket.

Congress	Elected at-large on a general ticket	
Congress	Seat A	Seat B
1st (1789–1791)	Benjamin Bourne (PA)	
2nd (1791–1793)	Benjamin Bourne (PA)	
3rd (1793–1795)	Benjamin Bourne (PA)	Francis Malbone (PA)
4th (1795–1797)	Benjamin Bourne (F)	Francis Malbone (F)
4th (1795–1797)	Elisha Reynolds Potter (F)	Francis Malbone (F)
5th (1797–1799)	Thomas Tillinghast (F)	Christopher G. Champlin (F)
6th (1799–1801)	John Brown (F)	Christopher G. Champlin (F)
7th (1801–1803)	Thomas Tillinghast (DR)	Joseph Stanton Jr. (DR)
8th (1803–1805)	Nehemiah Knight (DR)	Joseph Stanton Jr. (DR)
9th (1805–1807)	Nehemiah Knight (DR)	Joseph Stanton Jr. (DR)
10th (1807–1809)	Nehemiah Knight (DR)	Isaac Wilbour (DR)
10th (1807–1809)	Richard Jackson Jr. (F)	Isaac Wilbour (DR)
11th (1809–1811)	Richard Jackson Jr. (F)	Elisha Reynolds Potter (F)
12th (1811–1813)	Richard Jackson Jr. (F)	Elisha Reynolds Potter (F)
13th (1813–1815)	Richard Jackson Jr. (F)	Elisha Reynolds Potter (F)
14th (1815–1817)	John Linscom Boss Jr. (F)	James Brown Mason (F)
15th (1817–1819)	John Linscom Boss Jr. (F)	James Brown Mason (F)
16th (1819–1821)	Samuel Eddy (DR) (Note: Supported the Adams-Clay faction in the 1824 United States presidential election)	Nathaniel Hazard (DR)
17th (1821–1823)	Samuel Eddy (DR)	Job Durfee (DR)
18th (1823–1825)	Samuel Eddy (DR)	Job Durfee (DR)
19th (1825–1827)	Tristam Burges (NR)	Dutee J. Pearce (NR)
20th (1827–1829)	Tristam Burges (NR)	Dutee J. Pearce (NR)
21st (1829–1831)	Tristam Burges (NR)	Dutee J. Pearce (NR)
22nd (1831–1833)	Tristam Burges (NR)	Dutee J. Pearce (NR)
23rd (1833–1835)	Tristam Burges (NR)	Dutee J. Pearce (A-M)
24th (1835–1837)	William Sprague III (A-M)	Dutee J. Pearce (A-M)
25th (1837–1839)	Robert B. Cranston (W)	Joseph L. Tillinghast (W)
26th (1839–1841)	Robert B. Cranston (W)	Joseph L. Tillinghast (W)
27th (1841–1843)	Robert B. Cranston (W)	Joseph L. Tillinghast (W)

=== 1843 – present ===
In 1843 the at-large seat was eliminated. Since then, Representatives have been chosen from separate districts.

Congress	1st district	2nd district	3rd district
28th (1843–1845)	Henry Y. Cranston (LO)	Elisha R. Potter (LO)	
29th (1845–1847)	Henry Y. Cranston (W)	Lemuel H. Arnold (W)	
30th (1847–1849)	Robert B. Cranston (W)	Benjamin B. Thurston (D)	
31st (1849–1851)	George Gordon King (W)	Nathan F. Dixon II (W)	
32nd (1851–1853)	George Gordon King (W)	Benjamin B. Thurston (D)	
33rd (1853–1855)	Thomas Davis (D)	Benjamin B. Thurston (D)	
34th (1855–1857)	Nathan B. Durfee (KN)	Benjamin B. Thurston (KN)	
35th (1857–1859)	Nathan B. Durfee (R)	William D. Brayton (R)	
36th (1859–1861)	Christopher Robinson (R)	William D. Brayton (R)	
37th (1861–1863)	William P. Sheffield Sr. (U)	George H. Browne (CU)	
38th (1863–1865)	Thomas Jenckes (R)	Nathan F. Dixon II (R)	
39th (1865–1867)	Thomas Jenckes (R)	Nathan F. Dixon II (R)	
40th (1867–1869)	Thomas Jenckes (R)	Nathan F. Dixon II (R)	
41st (1869–1871)	Thomas Jenckes (R)	Nathan F. Dixon II (R)	
42nd (1871–1873)	Benjamin T. Eames (R)	James M. Pendleton (R)	
43rd (1873–1875)	Benjamin T. Eames (R)	James M. Pendleton (R)	
44th (1875–1877)	Benjamin T. Eames (R)	Latimer W. Ballou (R)	
45th (1877–1879)	Benjamin T. Eames (R)	Latimer W. Ballou (R)	
46th (1879–1881)	Nelson W. Aldrich (R)	Latimer W. Ballou (R)	
47th (1881–1883)	Nelson W. Aldrich (R)	Jonathan Chace (R)	
47th (1881–1883)	Henry J. Spooner (R)	Jonathan Chace (R)	
48th (1883–1885)	Henry J. Spooner (R)	Jonathan Chace (R)	
48th (1883–1885)	Henry J. Spooner (R)	Nathan F. Dixon III (R)	
49th (1885–1887)	Henry J. Spooner (R)	William A. Pirce (R)	
49th (1885–1887)	Henry J. Spooner (R)	Charles H. Page (D)	
50th (1887–1889)	Henry J. Spooner (R)	Warren O. Arnold (R)	
51st (1889–1891)	Henry J. Spooner (R)	Warren O. Arnold (R)	
52nd (1891–1893)	Oscar Lapham (D)	Charles H. Page (D)	
53rd (1893–1895)	Oscar Lapham (D)	Charles H. Page (D)	
54th (1895–1897)	Melville Bull (R)	Warren O. Arnold (R)	
55th (1897–1899)	Melville Bull (R)	Adin B. Capron (R)	
56th (1899–1901)	Melville Bull (R)	Adin B. Capron (R)	
57th (1901–1903)	Melville Bull (R)	Adin B. Capron (R)	
58th (1903–1905)	Daniel L. D. Granger (D)	Adin B. Capron (R)	
59th (1905–1907)	Daniel L. D. Granger (D)	Adin B. Capron (R)	
60th (1907–1909)	Daniel L. D. Granger (D)	Adin B. Capron (R)	
61st (1909–1911)	William P. Sheffield Jr. (R)	Adin B. Capron (R)	
62nd (1911–1913)	George F. O'Shaunessy (D)	George H. Utter (R)	
63rd (1913–1915)	George F. O'Shaunessy (D)	Peter G. Gerry (D)	Ambrose Kennedy (R)
64th (1915–1917)	George F. O'Shaunessy (D)	Walter R. Stiness (R)	Ambrose Kennedy (R)
65th (1917–1919)	George F. O'Shaunessy (D)	Walter R. Stiness (R)	Ambrose Kennedy (R)
66th (1919–1921)	Clark Burdick (R)	Walter R. Stiness (R)	Ambrose Kennedy (R)
67th (1921–1923)	Clark Burdick (R)	Walter R. Stiness (R)	Ambrose Kennedy (R)
68th (1923–1925)	Clark Burdick (R)	Richard S. Aldrich (R)	Jeremiah E. O'Connell (D)
69th (1925–1927)	Clark Burdick (R)	Richard S. Aldrich (R)	Jeremiah E. O'Connell (D)
70th (1927–1929)	Clark Burdick (R)	Richard S. Aldrich (R)	Louis Monast (R)
71st (1929–1931)	Clark Burdick (R)	Richard S. Aldrich (R)	Jeremiah E. O'Connell (D)
72nd (1931–1933)	Clark Burdick (R)	Richard S. Aldrich (R)	Francis Condon (D)
73rd (1933–1935)	Francis Condon (D)	John M. O'Connell (D)	
74th (1935–1937)	Charles Risk (R)	John M. O'Connell (D)	
75th (1937–1939)	Aime Forand (D)	John M. O'Connell (D)	
76th (1939–1941)	Charles Risk (R)	Harry Sandager (R)	
77th (1941–1943)	Aime Forand (D)	John E. Fogarty (D)	
78th (1943–1945)	Aime Forand (D)	John E. Fogarty (D)	
79th (1945–1947)	Aime Forand (D)	John E. Fogarty (D)	
80th (1947–1949)	Aime Forand (D)	John E. Fogarty (D)	
81st (1949–1951)	Aime Forand (D)	John E. Fogarty (D)	
82nd (1951–1953)	Aime Forand (D)	John E. Fogarty (D)	
83rd (1953–1955)	Aime Forand (D)	John E. Fogarty (D)	
84th (1955–1957)	Aime Forand (D)	John E. Fogarty (D)	
85th (1957–1959)	Aime Forand (D)	John E. Fogarty (D)	
86th (1959–1961)	Aime Forand (D)	John E. Fogarty (D)	
87th (1961–1963)	Fernand St Germain (D)	John E. Fogarty (D)	
88th (1963–1965)	Fernand St Germain (D)	John E. Fogarty (D)	
89th (1965–1967)	Fernand St Germain (D)	John E. Fogarty (D)	
90th (1967–1969)	Fernand St Germain (D)	Robert Tiernan (D)	
91st (1969–1971)	Fernand St Germain (D)	Robert Tiernan (D)	
92nd (1971–1973)	Fernand St Germain (D)	Robert Tiernan (D)	
93rd (1973–1975)	Fernand St Germain (D)	Robert Tiernan (D)	
94th (1975–1977)	Fernand St Germain (D)	Edward Beard (D)	
95th (1977–1979)	Fernand St Germain (D)	Edward Beard (D)	
96th (1979–1981)	Fernand St Germain (D)	Edward Beard (D)	
97th (1981–1983)	Fernand St Germain (D)	Claudine Schneider (R)	
98th (1983–1985)	Fernand St Germain (D)	Claudine Schneider (R)	
99th (1985–1987)	Fernand St Germain (D)	Claudine Schneider (R)	
100th (1987–1989)	Fernand St Germain (D)	Claudine Schneider (R)	
101st (1989–1991)	Ronald Machtley (R)	Claudine Schneider (R)	
102nd (1991–1993)	Ronald Machtley (R)	Jack Reed (D)	
103rd (1993–1995)	Ronald Machtley (R)	Jack Reed (D)	
104th (1995–1997)	Patrick J. Kennedy (D)	Jack Reed (D)	
105th (1997–1999)	Patrick J. Kennedy (D)	Robert Weygand (D)	
106th (1999–2001)	Patrick J. Kennedy (D)	Robert Weygand (D)	
107th (2001–2003)	Patrick J. Kennedy (D)	James Langevin (D)	
108th (2003–2005)	Patrick J. Kennedy (D)	James Langevin (D)	
109th (2005–2007)	Patrick J. Kennedy (D)	James Langevin (D)	
110th (2007–2009)	Patrick J. Kennedy (D)	James Langevin (D)	
111th (2009–2011)	Patrick J. Kennedy (D)	James Langevin (D)	
112th (2011–2013)	David Cicilline (D)	James Langevin (D)	
113th (2013–2015)	David Cicilline (D)	James Langevin (D)	
114th (2015–2017)	David Cicilline (D)	James Langevin (D)	
115th (2017–2019)	David Cicilline (D)	James Langevin (D)	
116th (2019–2021)	David Cicilline (D)	James Langevin (D)	
117th (2021–2023)	David Cicilline (D)	James Langevin (D)	
118th (2023–2025)	David Cicilline (D)	Seth Magaziner (D)	
118th (2023–2025)	Gabe Amo (D)	Seth Magaziner (D)	
119th (2025–2027)	Gabe Amo (D)	Seth Magaziner (D)	
120th (2027–2029)	Gabe Amo (D)	Seth Magaziner (D)	

== Key ==
Anti-Administration (AA)
Anti-Masonic (A-M)
Constitutional Union (CU)
Democratic (D)
Democratic-Republican (DR)
Federalist (F)
Pro-Administration (PA)
Know Nothing (KN)
Law and Order (LO)
National Republican (NR)
Republican (R)
Union (U)
Whig (W)

== See also ==
- List of United States congressional districts
- Rhode Island's congressional districts
- Political party strength in Rhode Island
