= List of United States representatives from Rhode Island =

The following is an alphabetical list of United States representatives from the state of Rhode Island. For chronological tables of members of both houses of the United States Congress from the state (through the present day), see Rhode Island's congressional delegations. The list of names should be complete, but other data may be incomplete.

== Current representatives ==
- 1st district: Gabe Amo (D) (since 2023)
- 2nd district: Seth Magaziner (D) (since 2023)

== List of members ==
Members	Party	Years	District	Notes
Nelson W. Aldrich	Republican	March 4, 1879 – October 4, 1881	1st	Elected in 1878. Resigned when elected U.S. senator.
Richard S. Aldrich	Republican	March 4, 1923 – March 3, 1933	2nd	Elected in 1922. Retired.
Gabe Amo	Democratic	November 7, 2023 – present	1st	Elected to finish Cicilline's term. Incumbent.
Lemuel H. Arnold	Whig	March 4, 1845 – March 3, 1847	2nd	Elected in 1845. Retired.
Warren O. Arnold	Republican	March 4, 1887 – March 3, 1891	2nd	Elected in 1886. Withdrew from election when neither candidate received a majority.
Warren O. Arnold	Republican	March 4, 1895 – March 3, 1897	2nd	Elected in 1894. Retired.
Latimer W. Ballou	Republican	March 4, 1875 – March 3, 1881	2nd	Elected in 1874. Retired.
Edward Beard	Democratic	January 3, 1975 – January 3, 1981	2nd	Elected in 1974. Lost re-election to Schneider.
John L. Boss Jr.	Federalist	March 4, 1815 – March 3, 1819	At-large	Elected in 1814. Retired.
Benjamin Bourne	Pro-Administration	August 31, 1790 – March 3, 1795	At-large	Elected in 1790. Switched parties.
Benjamin Bourne	Federalist	March 4, 1795 – ??, 1796	At-large	Re-elected in 1794 as a Federalist. Re-elected but declined the seat and resigned early.
William D. Brayton	Republican	March 4, 1857 – March 3, 1861	2nd	Elected in 1857. Lost re-election to Browne.
John Brown	Federalist	March 4, 1799 – March 3, 1801	At-large	Elected in 1798. Lost re-election to Stanton.
George H. Browne	Union	March 4, 1861 – March 3, 1863	2nd	Elected in 1861. Lost re-election to Dixon II.
Melville Bull	Republican	March 4, 1895 – March 3, 1903	1st	Elected in 1894. Lost re-election to Granger.
Clark Burdick	Republican	March 4, 1919 – March 3, 1933	1st	Elected in 1918. Lost re-election to Condon.
Tristram Burges	Anti-Jacksonian	March 4, 1825 – March 3, 1835	At-large	Elected in 1825. Lost re-election to Sprague.
Adin B. Capron	Republican	March 4, 1897 – March 3, 1911	2nd	Elected in 1896. Retired.
Jonathan Chace	Republican	March 4, 1881 – January 26, 1885	2nd	Elected in 1880. Retired to run for U.S. senator and resigned when elected.
Christopher G. Champlin	Federalist	March 4, 1797 – March 3, 1801	At-large	Elected in 1796. Lost re-election to Tillinghast.
David Cicilline	Democratic	January 3, 2011 – May 31, 2023	1st	Elected in 2010. Resigned to become president and chief executive officer of the Rhode Island Foundation.
Francis B. Condon	Democratic	November 4, 1930 – March 3, 1933	3rd	Elected to finish O'Connell's term. Redistricted to the 1st district.
Francis B. Condon	Democratic	March 4, 1933 – January 10, 1935	1st	Redistricted from the 3rd district and re-elected in 1932. Resigned to be seated as an Associate Justice of Rhode Island Supreme Court.
Henry Y. Cranston	Law and Order	March 4, 1843 – March 3, 1845	1st	Elected in 1843. Switched parties.
Henry Y. Cranston	Whig	March 4, 1845 – March 3, 1847	1st	Re-elected in 1845 as a Whig. Retired.
Robert B. Cranston	Whig	March 4, 1837 – March 3, 1843	At-large	Elected in 1837. Retired.
Robert B. Cranston	Whig	March 4, 1847 – March 3, 1849	1st	Elected in 1847. Retired.
Thomas Davis	Democratic	March 4, 1853 – March 3, 1855	1st	Elected in 1853. Lost re-election to N. Durfee.
Nathan F. Dixon II	Whig	March 4, 1849 – March 3, 1851	2nd	Elected in 1849. Retired.
Nathan F. Dixon II	Republican	March 4, 1863 – March 3, 1871	2nd	Elected in 1863. Retired.
Nathan F. Dixon, III	Republican	February 12, 1885 - March 4, 1885	2nd	Elected to finish Chace's term. Retired.
Job Durfee	Democratic-Republican	March 4, 1821 – March 3, 1825	At-large	Elected in 1820. Lost re-election to Pearce.
Nathan B. Durfee	Know-nothing	March 4, 1855 – March 3, 1857	1st	Elected in 1855. Switched parties.
Nathan B. Durfee	Republican	March 4, 1857 – March 3, 1859	1st	Re-elected in 1857 as a Republican. Retired.
Benjamin T. Eames	Republican	March 4, 1871 – March 3, 1879	1st	Elected in 1870. Retired.
Samuel Eddy	Democratic-Republican	March 4, 1819 – March 3, 1825	At-large	Elected in 1818. Lost re-election to Burges.
John E. Fogarty	Democratic	January 3, 1941 – January 10, 1967	2nd	Elected in 1940. Died.
Aime Forand	Democratic	January 3, 1937 – January 3, 1939	1st	Elected in 1936. Lost re-election to Risk.
Aime Forand	Democratic	January 3, 1941 – January 3, 1961	1st	Elected in 1940. Retired.
Peter G. Gerry	Democratic	March 4, 1913 – March 3, 1915	2nd	Elected in 1912. Lost re-election to Stiness.
Daniel L. D. Granger	Democratic	March 4, 1903 – February 14, 1909	1st	Elected in 1902. Lost re-election to Sheffield Jr. and died before next term.
Nathaniel Hazard	Democratic-Republican	March 4, 1819 – December 17, 1820	At-large	Elected in 1818. Lost re-election to J. Durfee and died before next term.
Richard Jackson Jr.	Federalist	November 11, 1808 – March 3, 1815	At-large	Elected to finish Knight's term. Retired.
Thomas A. Jenckes	Republican	March 4, 1863 – March 3, 1871	1st	Elected in 1863. Lost re-election to Eames.
Ambrose Kennedy	Republican	March 4, 1913 – March 3, 1923	3rd	Elected in 1912. Retired.
Patrick Kennedy	Democratic	January 3, 1995 – January 3, 2011	1st	Elected in 1994. Retired.
George G. King	Whig	March 4, 1849 – March 3, 1853	1st	Elected in 1849. Lost re-election to Davis.
Nehemiah Knight	Democratic-Republican	March 4, 1803 – June 13, 1808	At-large	Elected in 1802. Died.
James Langevin	Democratic	January 3, 2001 – January 3, 2023	2nd	Elected in 2000. Retired.
Oscar Lapham	Democratic	March 4, 1891 – March 3, 1895	1st	Elected in 1890. Lost re-election to Bull.
Ronald Machtley	Republican	January 3, 1989 – January 3, 1995	1st	Elected in 1988. Retired to run for governor.
Francis Malbone	Federalist	March 4, 1793 – March 3, 1797	At-large	Elected in 1792. Retired.
James B. Mason	Federalist	March 4, 1815 – March 3, 1819	At-large	Elected in 1814. Retired.
Seth Magaziner	Democratic	January 3, 2023 – present	2nd	Elected in 2022. Incumbent.
Louis Monast	Republican	March 4, 1927 – March 3, 1929	3rd	Elected in 1926. Lost re-election to J.E. O'Connell.
Jeremiah E. O'Connell	Democratic	March 4, 1923 – March 3, 1927	3rd	Elected in 1922. Lost re-election to Monast.
Jeremiah E. O'Connell	Democratic	March 4, 1929 – May 9, 1930	3rd	Elected in 1928. Resigned to become Associate Justice of Rhode Island Superior Court.
John M. O'Connell	Democratic	March 4, 1933 – January 3, 1939	2nd	Elected in 1932. Retired.
George F. O'Shaunessy	Democratic	March 4, 1911 – March 3, 1919	1st	Elected in 1910. Lost re-election to Burdick.
Charles H. Page	Democratic	February 21, 1887 - March 4, 1887	2nd	Elected to finish Pirce's term. Retired.
Charles H. Page	Democratic	March 4, 1891 – March 3, 1893	2nd	Elected in 1890. Seat declared vacant due to failure of candidates to attain majority.
Charles H. Page	Democratic	April 5, 1893 – March 3, 1895	2nd	Elected to finish vacant term. Retired.
Dutee J. Pearce	Anti-Jacksonian	March 4, 1825 – March 3, 1833	At-large	Elected in 1825. Switched parties.
Dutee J. Pearce	Anti-Masonic	March 4, 1833 – March 3, 1837	At-large	Re-elected in 1833 as an Anti-Masonic candidate. Lost re-election to J. Tillinghast.
James M. Pendleton	Republican	March 4, 1871 - March 4, 1875	2nd	Elected in 1870. Lost re-election to Ballou.
William A. Pirce	Republican	March 4, 1885 – January 25, 1887	2nd	Elected in 1884. Seat declared vacant due to election irregularities.
Elisha Potter	Federalist	November 15, 1796 – March 3, 1797	At-large	Elected to finish Bourne's term. Resigned.
Elisha Potter	Federalist	March 4, 1809 – March 3, 1815	At-large	Elected in 1808. Retired.
Elisha R. Potter	Law and Order	March 4, 1843 – March 3, 1845	2nd	Elected in 1843. Lost re-election to L. Arnold.
Jack Reed	Democratic	January 3, 1991 – January 3, 1997	2nd	Elected in 1990. Retired to run for U.S. Senator.
Charles Risk	Republican	August 6, 1935 – January 3, 1937	1st	Elected to finish Condon's term. Lost re-election to Forand.
Charles Risk	Republican	January 3, 1939 – January 3, 1941	1st	Elected in 1938. Lost re-election to Forand.
Christopher Robinson	Republican	March 4, 1859 – March 3, 1861	1st	Elected in 1859. Lost re-election to Sheffield.
Fernand St. Germain	Democratic	January 3, 1961 – January 3, 1989	1st	Elected in 1960. Lost re-election to Machtley.
Harry Sandager	Republican	January 3, 1939 – January 3, 1941	2nd	Elected in 1938. Lost re-election to Fogarty.
Claudine Schneider	Republican	January 3, 1981 – January 3, 1991	2nd	Elected in 1980. Retired to run for U.S. Senator.
William Paine Sheffield Sr.	Union	March 4, 1861 – March 3, 1863	1st	Elected in 1861. Retired.
William P. Sheffield	Republican	March 4, 1909 – March 3, 1911	1st	Elected in 1908. Lost re-election to O'Shaunessy.
Henry J. Spooner	Republican	December 5, 1881 – March 3, 1891	1st	Elected to finish Aldrich's term. Lost re-election to Lapham.
William Sprague III	Whig	March 4, 1835 – March 3, 1837	At-large	Elected in 1835. Retired.
Joseph Stanton Jr.	Democratic-Republican	March 4, 1801 – March 3, 1807	At-large	Elected in 1800. Retired.
Walter R. Stiness	Republican	March 4, 1915 – March 3, 1923	2nd	Elected in 1914. Retired.
Benjamin B. Thurston	Democratic	March 4, 1847 – March 3, 1849	2nd	Elected in 1847. Lost re-election to Dixon II.
Benjamin B. Thurston	Democratic	March 4, 1851 – March 3, 1855	2nd	Elected in 1851. Switched parties.
Benjamin B. Thurston	Know Nothing	March 4, 1855 – March 4, 1857	2nd	Re-elected in 1855 as a Know Nothing candidate. Retired.
Robert Tiernan	Democratic	March 28, 1967 – January 3, 1975	2nd	Elected to finish Fogarty's term. Lost renomination to Beard.
Joseph L. Tillinghast	Whig	March 4, 1837 – March 3, 1843	At-large	Elected in 1837. Retired.
Thomas Tillinghast	Federalist	November 13, 1797 – March 3, 1799	At-large	Elected to finish Potter's term. Lost re-election to J. Brown.
Thomas Tillinghast	Democratic-Republican	March 4, 1801 – March 3, 1803	At-large	Elected in 1800. Lost re-election to Knight.
George H. Utter	Republican	March 4, 1911 – November 3, 1912	2nd	Elected in 1910. Died.
Robert Weygand	Democratic	January 3, 1997 – January 3, 2001	2nd	Elected in 1996. Retired to run for U.S. Senator.
Isaac Wilbour	Democratic-Republican	March 4, 1807 – March 3, 1809	At-large	Elected in 1806. Lost re-election to Potter.

== See also ==
- List of United States senators from Rhode Island
- Rhode Island's congressional delegations
- Rhode Island's congressional districts

== Sources ==
- House of Representatives List of Members
