= Charles H. Page =

American politician

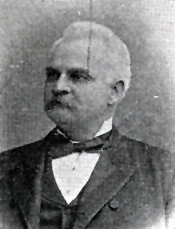

Member of the U.S. House of Representatives from Rhode Island's 2nd district
- In office February 21, 1887 – March 3, 1887
- Preceded by: William A. Pirce
- Succeeded by: Warren O. Arnold
- In office March 3, 1891 – March 3, 1893
- Preceded by: Warren O. Arnold
- Succeeded by: Himself
- In office April 5, 1893 – March 3, 1895
- Preceded by: Himself
- Succeeded by: Warren O. Arnold

Member of the Rhode Island House of Representatives
- In office 1872-1873

Member of the Rhode Island Senate
- In office 1874; 1875; 1884-1885

Personal details
- Born: July 19, 1843 Glocester, Rhode Island, U.S.
- Died: July 21, 1912 (aged 69) Providence, Rhode Island, U.S.
- Resting place: Swan Point Cemetery

Military service
- Allegiance: United States
- Branch/service: United States Army; Union Army
- Rank: Private
- Unit: 12th Rhode Island Infantry
- Battles/wars: Battle of Fredericksburg

Charles Harrison Page (July 19, 1843 – July 21, 1912) was a U.S. representative from Rhode Island.

Born in Glocester, Rhode Island, Page attended public schools. During the Civil War Page enlisted in the Union Army as a private at the age of nineteen in Company A, 12th Rhode Island Infantry, and was mustered out July 29, 1863. He resumed his studies in the Illinois State Normal School at Bloomington and at Southern Illinois College at Carbondale. He returned to Rhode Island in 1869 and taught in a school in Scituate until the spring of 1870, when he enrolled at the law department of the university of Albany, New York. He graduated in 1871. Page was admitted to the bar the same year and started his practice in Scituate, and in Providence, Rhode Island, in 1872. Later, he served as member of the State house of representatives in 1872 and 1873. He also served in the State senate in 1874, 1875, 1884, 1885, and 1890. He was an unsuccessful candidate for election in 1876 to the Forty-fifth Congress. He also contested for the post of attorney general in 1879. He served as a delegate to the Democratic National Conventions in 1880, 1884, and 1888. He also contested as a Democrat in the election of William A. Pirce to the Forty-ninth Congress, but the seat was declared vacant. Page was subsequently elected at a special election to fill the vacancy and served from February 21 to March 3, 1887.

Page was elected to the Fifty-second Congress (March 4, 1891 – March 3, 1893). He was reelected to the Fifty-third Congress at a special election (no candidate receiving a majority at the regular election), and served from April 5, 1893, to March 3, 1895. He served as a chairman of the Committee on Manufactures (Fifty-second and Fifty-third Congresses). He was not a candidate for renomination in 1894.

He resumed the practice of law until his death in Providence, Rhode Island, July 21, 1912. He was buried in the Swan Point Cemetery.

== Sources ==
- United States Congress. "Charles H. Page (id: P000015)". Biographical Directory of the United States Congress.

U.S. House of Representatives
Preceded by William A. Pirce	Member of the U.S. House of Representatives from Rhode Island's 2nd congressional district February 1887 – March 1887	Succeeded by Warren O. Arnold
Preceded by Warren O. Arnold	Member of the U.S. House of Representatives from Rhode Island's 2nd congressional district 1891–1893	Succeeded by Warren O. Arnold
Preceded by Warren O. Arnold	Member of the U.S. House of Representatives from Rhode Island's 2nd congressional district 1893–1895	Succeeded by Warren O. Arnold
