= Oscar Lapham =

American politician (1837–1926)

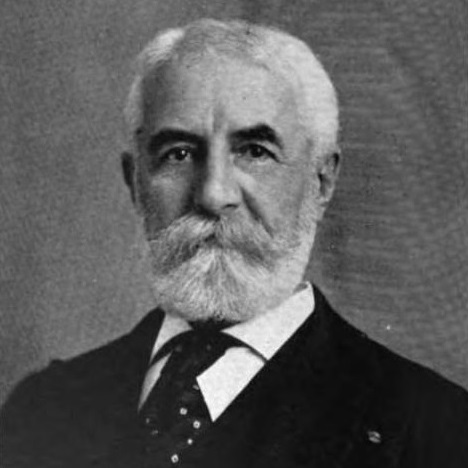

Member of the U.S. House of Representatives from Rhode Island's 1st district
- In office March 4, 1891 – March 3, 1895
- Preceded by: Henry J. Spooner
- Succeeded by: Melville Bull

Member of the Rhode Island Senate
- In office 1887–1889

Personal details
- Born: June 29, 1837 Burrillville, Rhode Island, US
- Died: March 29, 1926 (aged 88) Providence, Rhode Island, US
- Resting place: Swan Point Cemetery, Providence, Rhode Island, US
- Party: Democratic
- Spouse: Claira L. Lapham
- Children: Annie Lapham
- Parent(s): Duty Lapham; Lucinda (Wheelock) Lapham
- Education: Smithville Seminary; Pembroke Academy; Brown University
- Profession: Lawyer; Politician

Oscar Lapham (June 29, 1837 – March 29, 1926) was an American lawyer and politician from the U.S. state of Rhode Island. He served as a member of the Rhode Island Senate and the United States House of Representatives.

== Early life ==
Lapham was born in Burrillville, Rhode Island, and attended the Smithville Seminary in Scituate, Rhode Island, Pembroke Academy in Pembroke, New Hampshire and the University Grammar School in Providence, Rhode Island. In 1864, he graduated from Brown University. At Brown, he was a member of Phi Beta Kappa and Delta Kappa Epsilon. Lapham studied law and was admitted to the bar in 1867. He began the practice of law in Providence.

== Career ==
During the American Civil War, he served as first lieutenant, adjutant and captain in the Twelfth Rhode Island Volunteers. After the war, he was elected as a companion of the Massachusetts Commandery of the Military Order of the Loyal Legion of the United States.

He was a member of the Rhode Island Senate in 1887 and 1888, and served as chairman of the Judiciary Committee. He was treasurer of the Rhode Island Democratic Committee from 1887 to 1891.

Lapham was an unsuccessful candidate for election to the Forty-eighth, Fiftieth, and Fifty-first Congresses. He was elected as a Democratic candidate to the Fifty-second and Fifty-third Congresses, serving from March 4, 1891, to March 3, 1895. He was an unsuccessful candidate for reelection in 1894 to the Fifty-fourth Congress.

After leaving Congress, he resumed the practice of law in Providence. He served on the board of trustees and on the executive committee for his alma mater Brown University. He was a member of the Providence Board of Trade.

He died on March 29, 1926, in Providence and is interred in the Swan Point Cemetery there.

== Family life ==
Lapham was the son of Duty Lapham and Lucinda (Wheelock) Lapham. He married Claira L. Paine on June 20, 1876, and their only child Annie died in infancy.

U.S. House of Representatives
Preceded by Henry J. Spooner	Member of the U.S. House of Representatives from Rhode Island's 1st congressional district 1891 – 1895	Succeeded by Melville Bull
