= Harry Sandager =

American politician

Harry Sandanger
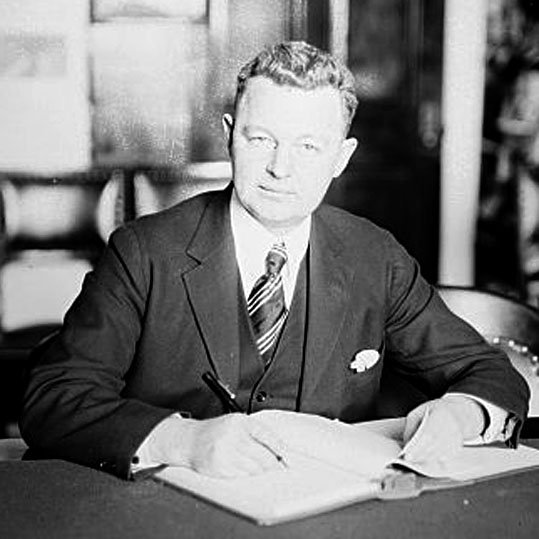

Member of the U.S. House of Representatives from Rhode Island's 2nd district
- In office January 3, 1939 – January 3, 1941
- Preceded by: John Matthew O'Connell
- Succeeded by: John E. Fogarty

Personal details
- Born: April 12, 1887 Providence, Rhode Island
- Died: December 24, 1955 (aged 68) Cranston, Rhode Island
- Resting place: St. Francis Cemetery; Pawtucket, Rhode Island
- Party: Republican
- Education: George Washington University; Georgetown University

Harry Sandager (April 12, 1887 – December 24, 1955) was a U.S. representative from Rhode Island.

== Biography ==
Harry Sandager was born in Providence, Rhode Island on April 12, 1887. He attended the public schools of Cranston, Rhode Island.

He was a newspaper reporter from 1905 to 1918 and Secretary to Congressman Walter R. Stiness from 1918 to 1922. Sandager received a Bachelor of Arts degree from George Washington University in 1922, and a Bachelor of Foreign Service degree from Georgetown University in 1923.

After graduation, he returned to Providence. From 1922 to 1931 he was an executive with D. W. Flint, the operator of Ford and Lincoln automobile and Fordson tractor dealerships throughout New England. He was elected to the Rhode Island House of Representatives in 1928 and served until 1936. He operated his own Ford dealership in Cranston beginning in 1931.

Sandager was elected as a Republican to the Seventy-sixth Congress (January 3, 1939 – January 3, 1941).

He was an unsuccessful candidate for reelection in 1940 to the Seventy-seventh Congress and for election in 1942 to the Seventy-eighth Congress. He returned to his auto dealership, and served as member of the Republican National Committee from 1941 to 1944.

Sandager died in Cranston on December 24, 1955, and was interred at St. Francis Cemetery, Pawtucket, Rhode Island.

U.S. House of Representatives
Preceded by John Matthew O'Connell	Member of the U.S. House of Representatives from Rhode Island's 2nd congressional district 1939–1941	Succeeded by John E. Fogarty
