= 1967 United States House of Representatives elections =

These are the elections in 1967 to the United States House of Representatives:

District	Incumbent			This race	
District	Member	Party	First elected	Results	Candidates
Rhode Island 2	John E. Fogarty	Democratic	1940	Incumbent died January 10, 1967. New member elected March 28, 1967. Democratic hold.	▌ ✓ Robert Tiernan (Democratic) 48.8%; ▌James DiPrete (Republican) 48.5%; ▌Albert Q. Perry (Independent) 2.6%
New York 18	Adam Clayton Powell Jr.	Democratic	1944	Incumbent excluded from the 90th Congress on February 28, 1967. Incumbent re-elected April 11, 1967. Democratic hold.	▌ ✓ Adam Clayton Powell Jr. (Democratic) 86.3%; ▌Lucille P. Williams (Republican) 12.3%; ▌E. Freeman Yearling (Conservative) 1.3%
California 11	J. Arthur Younger	Republican	1952	Incumbent died June 20, 1967. New member elected December 12, 1967. Republican hold.	▌ ✓ Pete McCloskey (Republican) 57.2%; ▌Roy A. Archibald (Democratic) 39.2%; ▌Shirley Temple (Republican write-in) 3.5%
