= John M. O'Connell =

American politician

John Matthew O'Connell
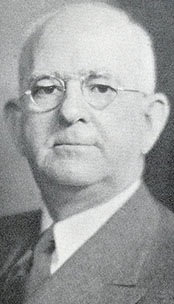

Member of the U.S. House of Representatives from Rhode Island's 2nd district
- In office March 4, 1933 – January 3, 1939
- Preceded by: Richard S. Aldrich
- Succeeded by: Harry Sandager

Member of the Rhode Island House of Representatives
- In office 1929–1932

Personal details
- Born: August 10, 1872 Westerly, Rhode Island
- Died: December 6, 1941 (aged 69) Westerly, Rhode Island
- Party: Democratic

Military service
- Allegiance: United States
- Branch/service: United States Army
- Unit: 12th Division
- Battles/wars: World War I

John Matthew O'Connell (August 10, 1872 – December 6, 1941) was a U.S. representative from Rhode Island.

Born in Westerly, Washington County, Rhode Island, O'Connell attended the public schools and taught in the local schools from 1892 to 1902. He graduated from the Philadelphia (Pennsylvania) Dental College (now a branch of Temple University) in 1905 and commenced practice in Westerly, Rhode Island, the same year. During World War I, he served for sixteen months with Headquarters Sanitary Train, Twelfth Division, and later as a major in the United States Dental Reserve. He was a member of the State house of representatives 1929-1932.

O'Connell was elected as a Democrat to the Seventy-third, Seventy-fourth, and Seventy-fifth Congresses (March 4, 1933 – January 3, 1939). He was not a candidate for renomination in 1938. He died in Westerly, Rhode Island, December 6, 1941 and was interred in St. Sebastian Cemetery.

== Sources ==
- United States Congress. "John M. O'Connell (id: O000025)". Biographical Directory of the United States Congress.

U.S. House of Representatives
Preceded by Richard S. Aldrich	Member of the U.S. House of Representatives from Rhode Island's 2nd congressional district 1933–1939	Succeeded by Harry Sandager
