= James M. Pendleton =

American politician

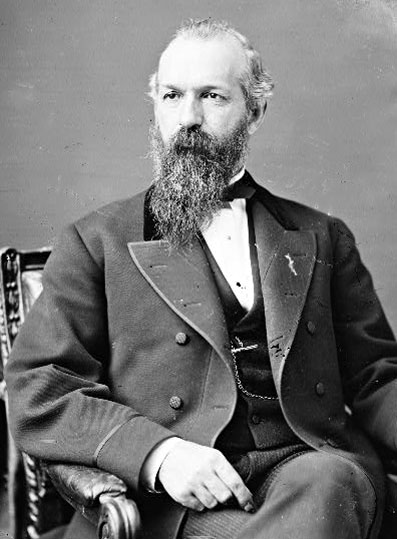

Member of the U.S. House of Representatives from Rhode Island's 2nd district
- In office March 4, 1871 – March 3, 1875
- Preceded by: Nathan F. Dixon II
- Succeeded by: Latimer Whipple Ballou

Member of the Rhode Island Senate
- In office 1862-1865

Member of the Rhode Island House of Representatives
- In office 1879-1884

Personal details
- Born: January 10, 1822 North Stonington, Connecticut, U.S.
- Died: February 16, 1889 (aged 67) Westerly, Rhode Island, U.S.
- Party: Republican

James Monroe Pendleton (January 10, 1822 – February 16, 1889) was a U.S. representative from Rhode Island.

== Biography ==
Born in Pendleton Hill in North Stonington, Connecticut, Pendleton attended school in North Stonington and Suffield, Connecticut. He moved to Westerly, Rhode Island, and engaged in mercantile pursuits and later in the insurance business and banking. He served in the State senate 1862-1865. He served as delegate to the 1868 Republican National Convention.

Pendleton was elected as a Republican to the Forty-second and Forty-third Congresses (March 4, 1871 – March 3, 1875). He was an unsuccessful candidate for reelection in 1874 to the Forty-fourth Congress. He served as member of the State house of representatives 1879-1884. He served as chairman of the State board of charities and corrections 1884-1889. He died in Westerly, Rhode Island, February 16, 1889. He was interred in River Bend Cemetery.

U.S. House of Representatives
Preceded by Nathan F. Dixon II	Member of the U.S. House of Representatives from Rhode Island's 2nd congressional district 1871–1875	Succeeded by Latimer Whipple Ballou
