= Job Durfee =

American judge (1790–1847)

Member of the U.S. House of Representatives from Rhode Island's at-large district
- In office March 4, 1821 – March 3, 1825
- Preceded by: Nathaniel Hazard
- Succeeded by: Dutee Jerauld Pearce

36th Chief Justice of the Rhode Island Supreme Court
- In office March 4, 1835 – March 3, 1847
- Preceded by: Samuel Eddy
- Succeeded by: Richard W. Green

Personal details
- Born: September 20, 1790 Tiverton, Rhode Island
- Died: July 26, 1847 (aged 57) Tiverton, Rhode Island
- Party: Democratic-Republican, Adams-Clay Republican
- Education: Brown University, 1813
- Occupation: Lawyer, congressman, chief justice

Job Durfee (September 20, 1790 – July 26, 1847) was a politician and jurist from Rhode Island. Born at Tiverton, he graduated from Brown University in 1813 and was admitted to the bar and commenced practice in Tiverton. He was a member of the Rhode Island House of Representatives from 1816 to 1820, and was elected as a Democratic-Republican to the Seventeenth Congress and was reelected as an Adams-Clay Republican to the Eighteenth Congress, serving from March 4, 1821, to March 3, 1825. He was an unsuccessful candidate for reelection in 1824 to the Nineteenth Congress and for election in 1828 to the Twenty-first Congress; he was again a member of the State house of representatives from 1826 to 1829, serving as speaker from 1827 to 1829. He declined to be a candidate for reelection and resumed the practice of law; in May 1833 he was elected associate justice of the Rhode Island Supreme Court. He was chief justice from June 1835 until his death in Tiverton in 1847. As chief justice, he presided over the trial of the last person executed in Rhode Island, John Gordon. Durfee's interment was in the family burying ground at Quaker Neck, near Tiverton.

Durfee was the author of What Cheer, a poem in nine cantos; of an oration, The Influences of Scientific Discovery and Invention on Social and Political Progress, or Roger Williams in Exile (1843), under the pseudonym "Theaptes;" and of a philosophical work, entitled The Panidea (1846).

U.S. House of Representatives
Preceded by Nathaniel Hazard	Member of the U.S. House of Representatives from Rhode Island's at-large congressional district 1821–1825	Succeeded by Dutee J. Pearce
