= William Paine Sheffield Jr. =

American politician

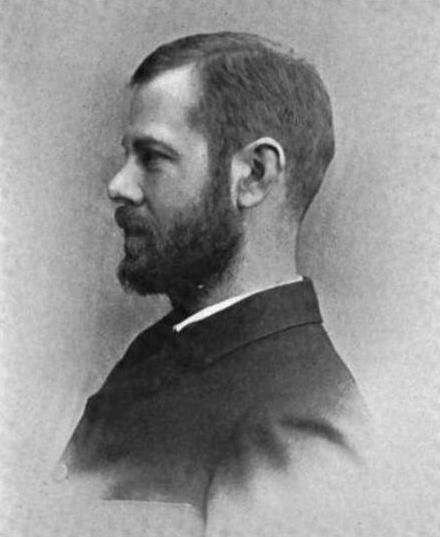

Member of the U.S. House of Representatives from Rhode Island's 1st district
- In office March 4, 1909 – March 3, 1911
- Preceded by: Daniel L. D. Granger
- Succeeded by: George F. O'Shaunessy

Member of the Rhode Island House of Representatives
- In office 1885-1887; 1889-1890; 1894-1896; 1899-1901

Personal details
- Born: June 1, 1857 Newport, Rhode Island, U.S.
- Died: October 19, 1919 (aged 62) Exeter, Rhode Island, U.S.
- Resting place: Island Cemetery; Newport, Rhode Island
- Party: Republican
- Education: Brown University

William Paine Sheffield (June 1, 1857 – October 19, 1919) was a United States representative from Rhode Island. Born in Newport, R.I. on June 1, 1857, he was the son of U.S. Representative William Paine Sheffield Sr.

He was born in Newport, Rhode Island and attended Phillips Academy, Andover, Massachusetts from 1869 to 1873. He graduated from Brown University in 1877, and studied law at the University of Paris and Harvard Law School. He was admitted to the bar in 1880 and commenced practice in Newport.

He was a commissioner to extend citizenship to the Narragansett Tribe of Indians in 1880.

Sheffield was commissioned a colonel in the Rhode Island Militia on the military staff of Governor George Peabody Wetmore in 1895. He was member of the Rhode Island House of Representatives in 1885–1887, 1889, 1890, 1894–1896, and 1899–1901. He served as a member of the commission to revise the State constitution in 1897.

Sheffield was elected as a Republican to the Sixty-first Congress and served from March 4, 1909, to March 3, 1911. He was an unsuccessful candidate for reelection in 1910 and in 1912.

He served as a member of the Republican National Committee in 1913 as well as a member of the committee to revise the State constitution in 1918.

In 1920 Sheffield was elected as an honorary member of the Rhode Island Society of the Cincinnati. He and his father are among the very few father and son "teams" to both be elected to membership in the Society.

He died in Exeter, Rhode Island on October 19, 1919. He was buried in the Island Cemetery in Newport.

U.S. House of Representatives
Preceded by Daniel L.D. Granger	Member of the U.S. House of Representatives from Rhode Island's 1st congressional district March 4, 1909 – March 3, 1911	Succeeded by George F. O'Shaunessy
