= Adin B. Capron =

American politician (1841–1911)

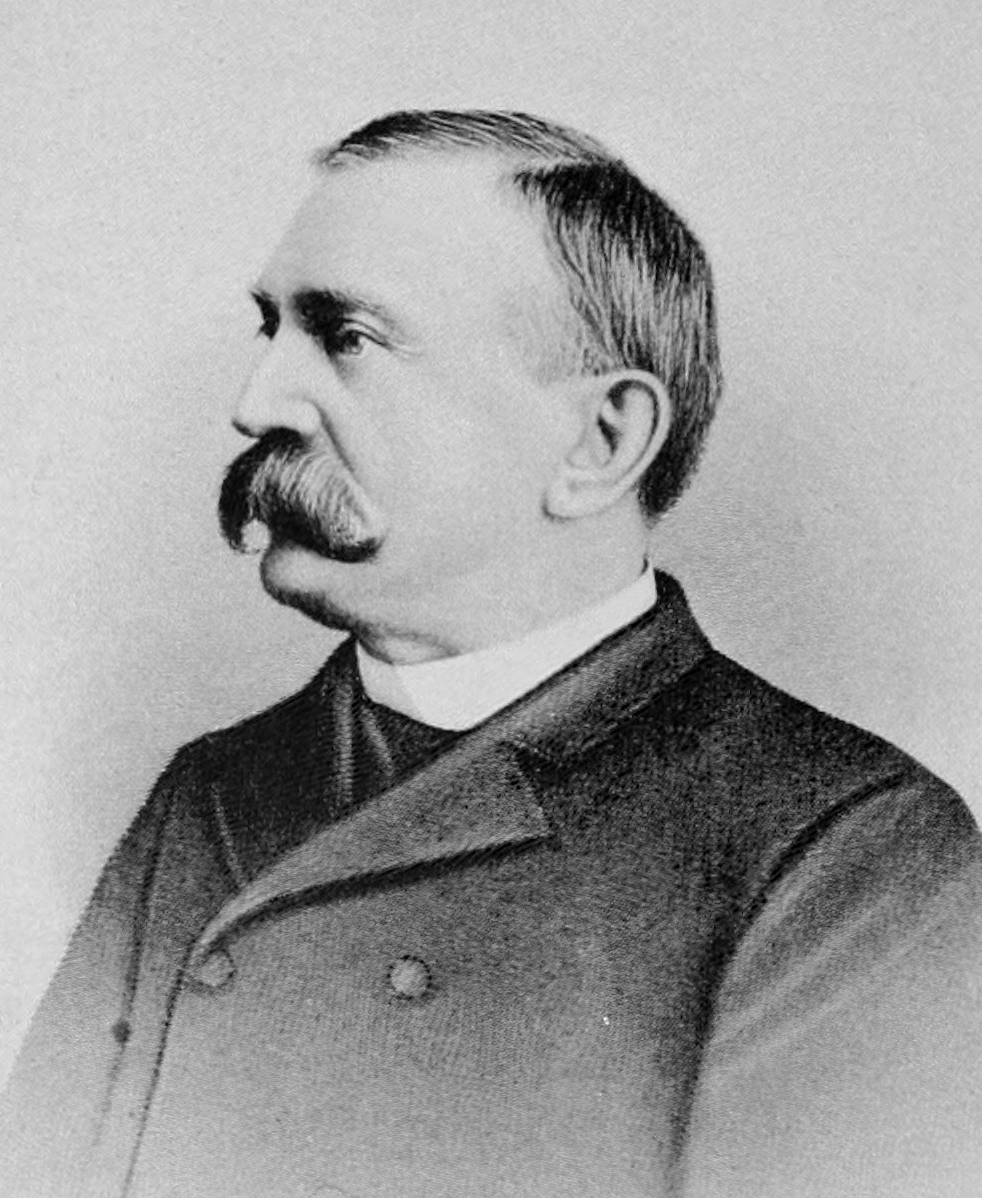

Member of the U.S. House of Representatives from Rhode Island's 2nd district
- In office March 4, 1897 – March 3, 1911
- Preceded by: Warren O. Arnold
- Succeeded by: George H. Utter

Member of the Rhode Island House of Representatives
- In office 1887–1892

Personal details
- Born: January 9, 1841 Mendon, Massachusetts, U.S.
- Died: March 17, 1911 (aged 70) Stillwater, Rhode Island, U.S.
- Resting place: Swan Point Cemetery; Providence, Rhode Island
- Party: Republican
- Spouse(s): Irene Ballou; Phebe Almira Mowry
- Children: Helen Mowry Capron; John Mowry Capon; Adin Mowry Capon; Almira Mowry Capron
- Parent(s): Carlile Willis Capron; Abigail (Bates) Capron
- Education: Westbrook Seminary
- Profession: Miller; Politician

Military service
- Allegiance: (United States) United States; Union
- Branch/service: United States Army; Union Army
- Rank: Brevet Major
- Unit: 2nd Rhode Island Infantry
- Battles/wars: American Civil War

Adin Ballou Capron (January 9, 1841 – March 17, 1911) was an American miller and politician from the U.S. state of Rhode Island. He served in the American Civil War and was a member of the United States House of Representatives.

== Early life and military career ==
Born in Mendon, Massachusetts, Capron attended Woonsocket High School and Westbrook Seminary, near Portland, Maine. He settled in Stillwater, Rhode Island, and engaged in milling and dealing in grain. He enlisted as a sergeant in the 2nd Rhode Island Regiment of the Rhode Island Volunteer Infantry in May 1861. He was promoted to the rank of sergeant major on July 11, 1861, and commissioned lieutenant in September 1861.

He served in the Signal Corps until the close of the Civil War, having been commissioned first lieutenant on March 3, 1863, and subsequently promoted to the rank of captain and major by brevet.

== Political career ==
From 1887 to 1892, Capron served as member of the Rhode Island House of Representatives, and was speaker of the State House in 1891 and 1892. He was an unsuccessful candidate for election in 1892 to the Fifty-third Congress.

Capron was elected as a Republican candidate to the 55th United States Congress and to the six succeeding Congresses, serving in Congress from March 4, 1897, to March 3, 1911. He was not a candidate for renomination in 1910.

After leaving Congress, he resumed his former business activities in Stillwater, where he died March 17, 1911. He was interred in Swan Point Cemetery in Providence, Rhode Island.

== Family life ==
Capron was the son of Carlile Willis Capron and Abigail (Bates) Capron. He married Irene Ballou in August 1868 and she died ten months later. Following her death, Capron married Phebe Almira Mowry in April 1874. Capron and Phebe had four children: Helen Mowry Capron, John Mowry Capon, Adin Mowry Capon and Almira Mowry Capron.

U.S. House of Representatives
| Preceded by Warren O. Arnold | Member of the U.S. House of Representatives from Rhode Island's 2nd congressional district 1897-1911 | Succeeded by George H. Utter |
