= Warren O. Arnold =

American politician

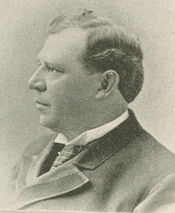

Member of the U.S. House of Representatives from Rhode Island's 2nd district
- In office March 4, 1887 – March 3, 1891
- Preceded by: Charles H. Page
- Succeeded by: Charles H. Page
- In office March 4, 1895 – March 3, 1897
- Preceded by: Charles H. Page
- Succeeded by: Adin B. Capron

Personal details
- Born: June 3, 1839 Coventry, Rhode Island, U.S.
- Died: April 1, 1910 (aged 70) Westerly, Rhode Island, U.S.
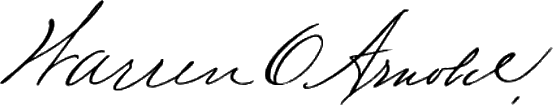
- Signature

Warren Otis Arnold (June 3, 1839 – April 1, 1910) was a U.S. Representative from Rhode Island.

Born in Coventry, Rhode Island, Arnold attended the common schools. He engaged in mercantile pursuits at Coventry from 1857 to 1864. He was a manufacturer of cotton goods in Chepachet and Westerly, Rhode Island, until 1866 when he began the manufacture of woolen goods.

Arnold was elected as a Republican to the Fiftieth and Fifty-first Congresses (March 4, 1887 – March 3, 1891). He was a candidate for re-election in 1890 to the Fifty-second Congress. But, as neither candidate received a majority the general assembly ordered a new election, in which he declined to be a participant.

Arnold was elected to the Fifty-fourth Congress (March 4, 1895 – March 3, 1897). He declined to be a candidate for renomination in 1896. He continued his former manufacturing pursuits until his death in Westerly, Washington County, Rhode Island on April 1, 1910, aged 70. He was interred in Acotes Hill Cemetery, Chepachet, Rhode Island.

== Sources ==
- United States Congress. "Warren O. Arnold (id: A000298)". Biographical Directory of the United States Congress.
- "Arnold, Warren O.". The Biographical Dictionary of America. Vol. 1. 1906. p. 145.

U.S. House of Representatives
Preceded by Charles H. Page	Member of the U.S. House of Representatives from Rhode Island's 2nd congressional district 1887–1891	Succeeded by Charles H. Page
Preceded by Charles H. Page	Member of the U.S. House of Representatives from Rhode Island's 2nd congressional district 1895–1897	Succeeded by Adin B. Capron
