= George F. O'Shaunessy =

American politician

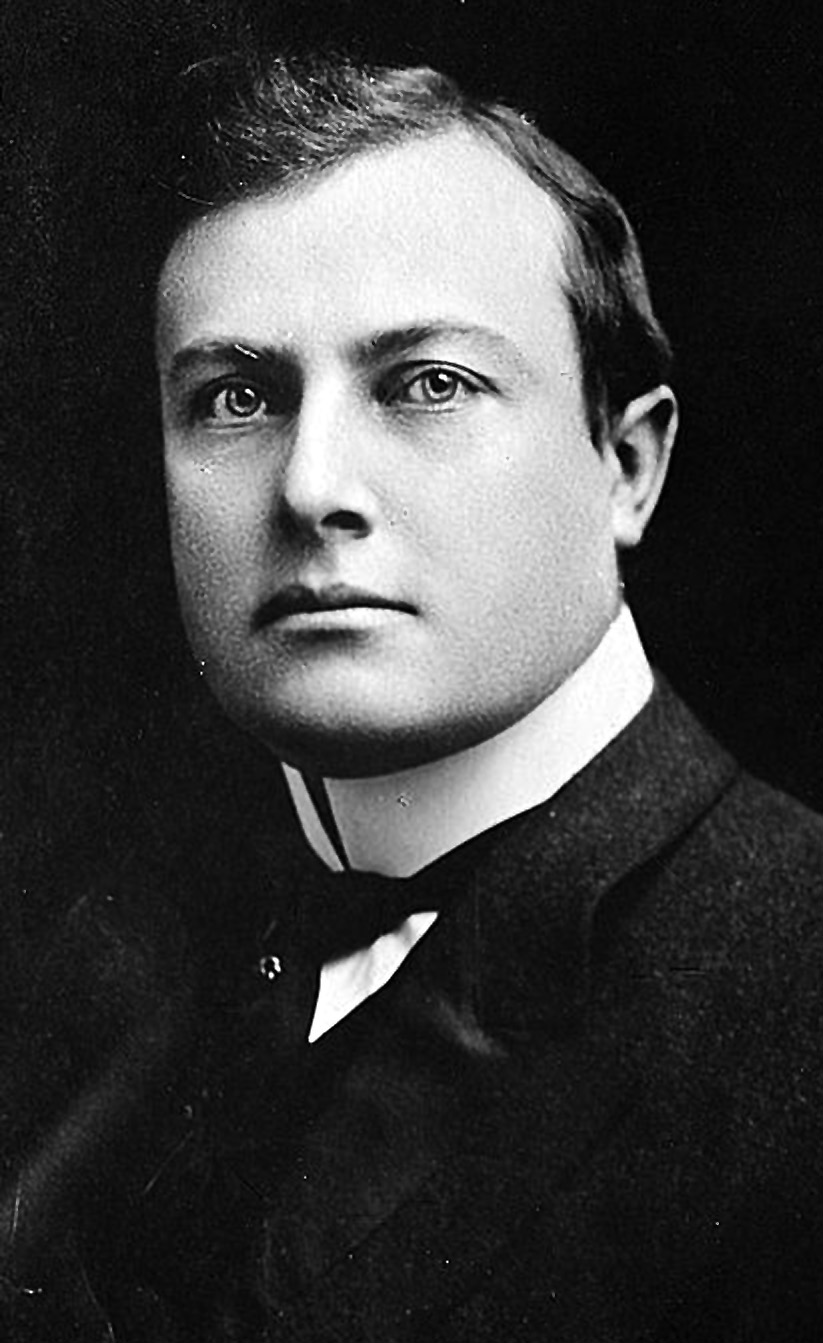
- George F. O'Shaunessy

Member of the U.S. House of Representatives from Rhode Island's 1st district
- In office March 4, 1911 – March 3, 1919
- Preceded by: William Paine Sheffield, Jr.
- Succeeded by: Clark Burdick

Personal details
- Born: George Francis O'Shaunessy; May 1, 1868 Galway, Ireland
- Died: November 28, 1934 (aged 66) Providence, Rhode Island, U.S.
- Party: Democratic
- Education: Columbia College Law School

George Francis O'Shaunessy (May 1, 1868 – November 28, 1934) was an American politician. He was born in 1868 in Galway, Ireland and immigrated to New York in 1872. After attending Columbia College Law School, he was admitted to the bar of New York in 1889. He served as deputy attorney general of New York in 1904 and 1905 and as assistant corporation counsel of New York City in 1906.

He moved to Rhode Island in 1907 and was elected as a Democrat to Congress representing Rhode Island's 1st Congressional District in 1910. He remained a Representative until 1919, having declined to run in 1918 in order to seek (unsuccessfully) election as a U.S. Senator.

O'Shaunessy then was appointed by President Woodrow Wilson collector of internal revenue for the district of Rhode Island. He served in that position until Wilson left office in 1921, when he returned to the practice of law.

He died in Providence in 1934. He was buried in St. Francis Cemetery in Pawtucket, Rhode Island.

Party political offices
First	Democratic nominee for U.S. Senator from Rhode Island (Class 2); 1918	Succeeded by William S. Flynn
U.S. House of Representatives
Preceded by William P. Sheffield	Member of the U.S. House of Representatives from Rhode Island's 1st congressional district March 4, 1911 – March 3, 1919	Succeeded by Clark Burdick
