= Robert B. Cranston =

American politician

Member of the U.S. House of Representatives from Rhode Island
- In office March 4, 1847 – March 3, 1849
- Preceded by: Henry Y. Cranston
- Succeeded by: George G. King
- Constituency: 1st district
- In office March 4, 1837 – March 3, 1843
- Preceded by: William Sprague III
- Succeeded by: District abolished
- Constituency: At-large district

Member of the Rhode Island House of Representatives
- In office 1843–1847

Personal details
- Born: January 14, 1791 Newport, Rhode Island, U.S.
- Died: January 27, 1873 (aged 82) Newport, Rhode Island, U.S.
- Resting place: Island Cemetery
- Party: Whig

Robert Bennie Cranston (January 14, 1791 – January 27, 1873) was a U.S. representative from Rhode Island, brother of Henry Young Cranston.

== Biography ==
Born in Newport, Rhode Island, Cranston attended the public schools. He was employed in the collection of internal revenue 1812–1815. Sheriff of Newport County 1818–1827. Postmaster of Newport in 1827.

Cranston was elected as a Whig to the Twenty-fifth, Twenty-sixth, and Twenty-seventh Congresses (March 4, 1837 – March 3, 1843). He served as member of the State house of representatives 1843–1847, and served one year as speaker. He served in the State senate.

Cranston was elected as a Whig to the Thirtieth Congress (March 4, 1847 – March 3, 1849). He was elected the first mayor of Newport on June 9, 1853. He resigned the same day. He served as presidential elector on the Republican ticket in 1864.

He was a member of the historic Artillery Company of Newport. He served as the company's captain (fourth in command) from 1815 to 1818 and as its lieutenant colonel (second in command) from 1818 to 1819.

He died in Newport, Rhode Island, January 27, 1873. He was interred in the Island Cemetery in Newport.

== Sources ==
- United States Congress. "Robert B. Cranston (id: C000879)". Biographical Directory of the United States Congress.

U.S. House of Representatives
Preceded by William Sprague III	Member of the U.S. House of Representatives from Rhode Island's at-large congressional district March 4, 1837 – March 3, 1843	Succeeded by District inactive
Preceded by Henry Y. Cranston	Member of the U.S. House of Representatives from Rhode Island's 1st congressional district March 4, 1847 – March 3, 1849	Succeeded by George G. King
