= Thomas Jenckes =

American politician

Thomas A. Jenckes
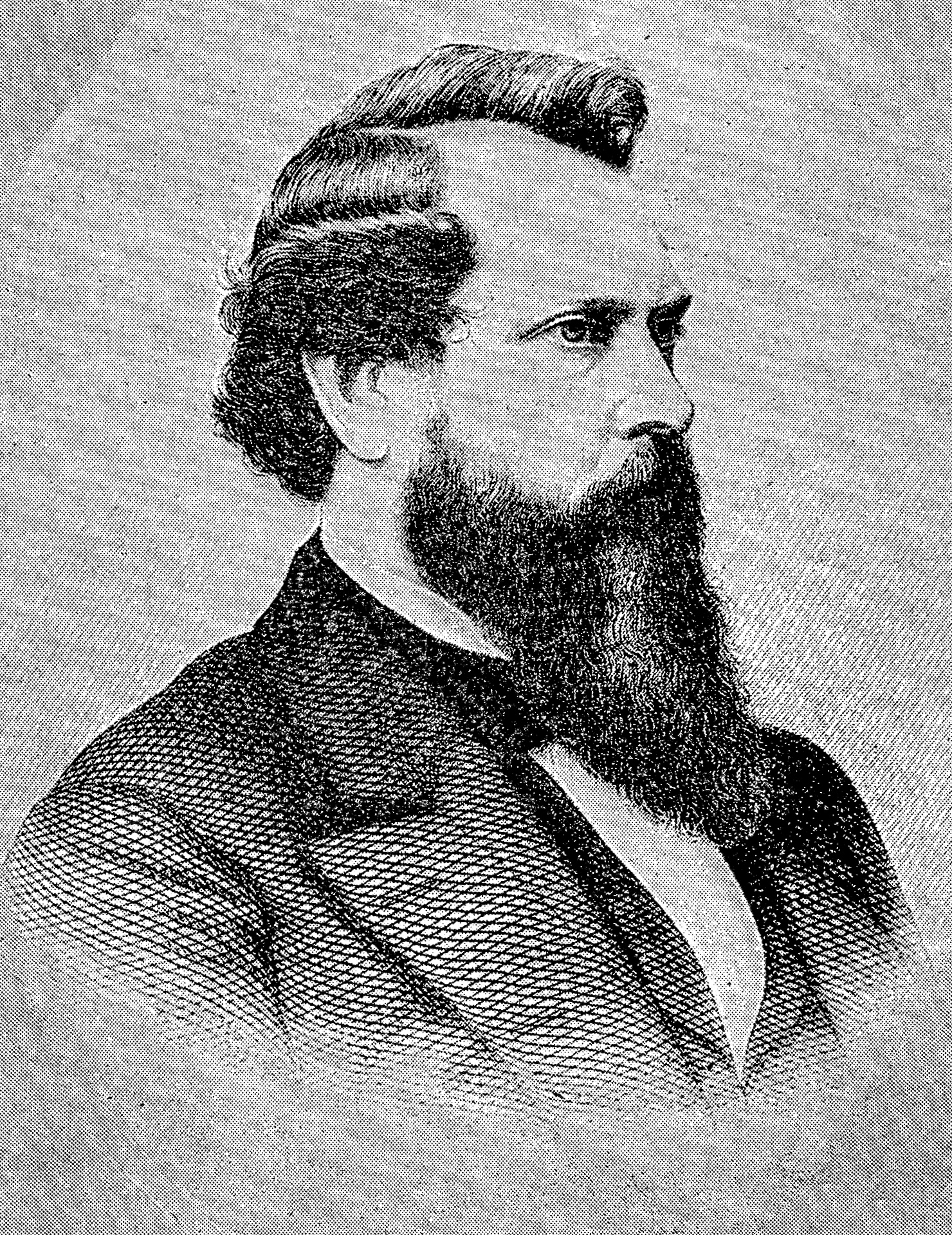

Member of the U.S. House of Representatives from Rhode Island's 1st district
- In office March 4, 1863 – March 3, 1871
- Preceded by: William Paine Sheffield, Sr.
- Succeeded by: Benjamin T. Eames

Member of the Rhode Island House of Representatives
- In office 1854–1857

Personal details
- Born: November 2, 1818 Cumberland, Rhode Island, U.S.
- Died: November 4, 1875 (aged 57) Cumberland, Rhode Island, U.S.
- Resting place: Swan Point Cemetery
- Party: Republican
- Education: Brown University
- Occupation: Lawyer

Thomas Allen Jenckes I (November 2, 1818 – November 4, 1875) was a United States representative from Rhode Island. Jenckes was best known for introducing a bill that created the United States Department of Justice. President Ulysses S. Grant then signed the bill into law on June 22, 1870. Jenckes was also a supporter of civil service reform.

== Biography ==
Thomas Jenckes was born in Cumberland, Rhode Island on November 2, 1818. He graduated from Brown University in 1838. Jenckes was admitted to the Rhode Island state bar in 1840. He was clerk in the Rhode Island state legislature from 1840 until 1844. From 1854 until 1857 he was a member of the State house of representatives. He was elected as Republican to the United States Congress in 1863 and served until 1871 when he lost a bid for reelection. He then resumed the practice of law in Cumberland.

=== U.S. House of Representatives ===
Jenckes was first elected to the U.S. House in 1863, defeating Democratic opponent Charles J. Bradley by seventeen percentage points. He was subsequently re-elected three times by landslide margins.

During his House tenure, Jenckes was mostly known for introducing legislation which created the United States Department of Justice. Contrary to some narratives that suggest this was an effort to bolster Reconstruction policies during the presidency of Ulysses S. Grant and safeguard the constitutional rights of blacks, it was primarily for the purpose of professionalizing legal practice. Indeed, Jenckes "paid little attention" to protecting Southern blacks. He was one of three House Republicans to oppose the initial version of the Fifteenth Amendment to the United States Constitution, although he voted in favor of the final version.

Considered a "reformer," Jenckes was an early advocate of civil service reform and known as "the father of civil service." When he introduced legislation pushing it, fierce opposition was met by Radical Republican colleague John A. Logan of Illinois, who was concerned with the plight of Southern blacks and called the bill "probably unconstitutional." The enactment of a civil service system to replace the traditional spoils system would prevent Republicans from utilizing patronage to benefit blacks, and it was later implemented via the Pendleton Civil Service Reform Act years after Jenckes left office.

Having prosecuted fraud implicated in the Credit Mobilier scandal, Jenckes' tenure was also marked by his revisions of bankruptcy law and involvement in cases related to Goodyear rubber, the Corliss steam engine, in addition to patents pertaining to refrigeration and ventilation.

In the 1870 United States House of Representatives elections, Jenckes was defeated by fellow Republican Benjamin T. Eames.

=== Death ===
Jenckes died in Cumberland, Rhode Island on November 4, 1875, and is interred at Swan Point Cemetery in Providence.

U.S. House of Representatives
Preceded by William Paine Sheffield, Sr.	Member of the U.S. House of Representatives from Rhode Island's 1st congressional district 1863-1871	Succeeded by Benjamin T. Eames
