= William D. Brayton =

American politician (1815–1887)

William Daniel Brayton
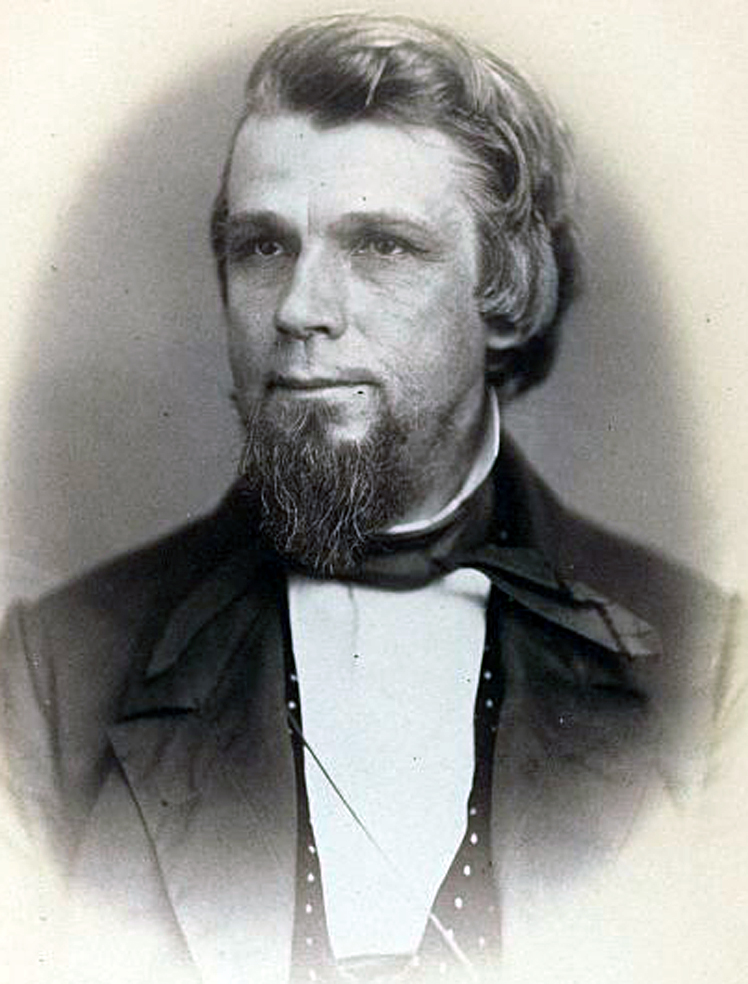

Member of the U.S. House of Representatives from Rhode Island's 2nd district
- In office March 4, 1857 – March 3, 1861
- Preceded by: Benjamin Babock Thurston
- Succeeded by: George H. Browne

Member of the Rhode Island House of Representatives
- In office 1841; 1851

Member of the Rhode Island Senate
- In office 1848; 1853

Personal details
- Born: November 6, 1815 Warwick, Rhode Island, U.S.
- Died: June 30, 1887 (aged 71) Providence, Rhode Island, U.S.
- Resting place: Brayton Cemetery; Apponaug, Rhode Island
- Party: Republican
- Education: Brown University

Military service
- Allegiance: Rhode Island
- Branch/service: Rhode Island Militia
- Rank: Major
- Battles/wars: Dorr Rebellion

William Daniel Brayton (November 6, 1815 – June 30, 1887) was a U.S. Representative from Rhode Island.

Born in Warwick, Rhode Island, Brayton attended Kent Academy in East Greenwich, Rhode Island. Brayton spent two years in Brown University, Providence, Rhode Island and then engaged in mercantile pursuits. He was a Major of the Fourth Regiment of Rhode Island Militia in the Dorr Rebellion. Later, in 1844, he was the town clerk of Warwick and also as member of the town council. He served as member of the State house of representatives in 1841 and 1851. He served in the State Senate in 1848 and 1853.

Brayton was elected as a Republican to the Thirty-fifth and Thirty-sixth Congresses (March 4, 1857 – March 3, 1861). He served as chairman of the Committee on Expenditures on Public Buildings (Thirty-sixth Congress). He was an unsuccessful candidate for reelection in 1860 to the Thirty-seventh Congress.

He was appointed collector of internal revenue for the second district of Rhode Island in 1862 and served until 1871, when he resigned. He served as delegate to the Republican National Convention in 1872. For a number of years he was in charge of the money-order division of the Providence post office. He died in Providence, Rhode Island on June 30, 1887. He was interred in Brayton Cemetery, Apponaug, Rhode Island.

== Sources ==
- United States Congress. "William D. Brayton (id: B000779)". Biographical Directory of the United States Congress.

U.S. House of Representatives
Preceded by Benjamin Babock Thurston	Member of the U.S. House of Representatives from Rhode Island's 2nd congressional district 1857–1861	Succeeded by George H. Browne
