= Henry Y. Cranston =

American politician

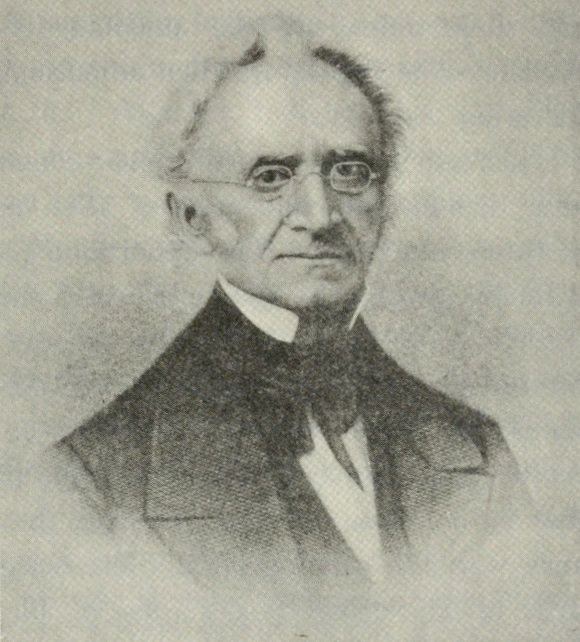

Member of the U.S. House of Representatives from Rhode Island's 1st district
- In office March 4, 1843 – March 3, 1847
- Preceded by: District established
- Succeeded by: Robert B. Cranston

Member of the Rhode Island House of Representatives
- In office 1827–1843

Personal details
- Born: Henry Young Cranston; October 9, 1789 Newport, Rhode Island, U.S.
- Died: February 12, 1864 (aged 74) Newport, Rhode Island, U.S.
- Resting place: Island Cemetery, Newport, Rhode Island
- Party: Whig
- Other political affiliations: Law and Order (until 1845)
- Relatives: Robert B. Cranston (brother)

Henry Young Cranston (October 9, 1789 – February 12, 1864) was a U.S. representative from Rhode Island, brother of Robert B. Cranston.

== Biography ==
Born in Newport, Rhode Island, Cranston attended the public schools. He engaged in mercantile pursuits in New Bedford, Massachusetts. He moved to Newport, Rhode Island, in 1810, and engaged in business as a commission merchant until 1815. He studied law. He was admitted to the bar in 1819 and commenced practice in Newport. He served as clerk of the court of common pleas 1818–1833. He held the rank of colonel in the Rhode Island Militia and commanded the Artillery Company of Newport from 1825–1828. He served as member of the Rhode Island House of Representatives from 1827 to 1843. He served as member and vice president of the convention that framed the State constitution in 1842.

Cranston was elected to the Twenty-eighth Congress as a Law and Order Party of Rhode Island candidate. He was reelected as a Whig to the Twenty-ninth Congress (March 4, 1843 – March 3, 1847). He was again a member of the state House of Representatives from 1847 to 1854, and served three years as Speaker of the House. He was among the signatories of the letter calling for the creation of the Constitutional Union Party in 1860. He died in Newport, Rhode Island, February 12, 1864. He was interred in the Island Cemetery in Newport.

== Sources ==
- United States Congress. "Henry Y. Cranston (id: C000878)". Biographical Directory of the United States Congress.

U.S. House of Representatives
Preceded by District created	Member of the U.S. House of Representatives from Rhode Island's 1st congressional district March 4, 1843 – March 3, 1847	Succeeded by Robert B. Cranston
