= William A. Pirce =

American politician

William Almy Pirce
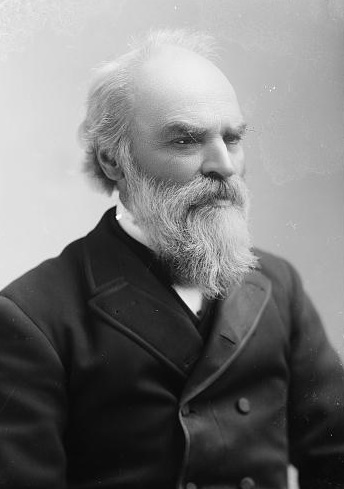
- C.M. Bell Studio Collection, Library of Congress

Member of the U.S. House of Representatives from Rhode Island's 2nd district
- In office March 4, 1885 – January 25, 1887
- Preceded by: Nathan F. Dixon III
- Succeeded by: Charles H. Page

Member of the Rhode Island House of Representatives
- In office 1858; 1862; 1879-1881

Personal details
- Born: February 29, 1824 Hope, Rhode Island, U.S.
- Died: March 5, 1891 (aged 67) Johnston, Rhode Island, U.S.
- Resting place: Swan Point Cemetery
- Party: Republican

William Almy Pirce (February 29, 1824 – March 5, 1891) was a U.S. representative from Rhode Island.

== Early life ==
Born in Hope, Rhode Island, Pirce attended the common schools and Smithville Seminary (now Lapham Institute). For ten years, he was a manager of his father's cotton mills, store and counting room in Simmons Upper Village, a part of Johnston.

== Political background ==
From 1854 to 1863, Pirce worked in manufactured cotton goods. Then in 1855 and 1882, he served in the Rhode Island State Senate. Then in 1858 and 1862, and then from 1879 to 1881, he served in the Rhode Island House of Representatives. In 1880, Pirce was a delegate to the 1880 Republican National Convention and in 1884 was a member of the Republican National Committee. Then from 1862 to 1873, Pirce was the assessor of internal revenue for the second district of Rhode Island and, in 1863, he was appointed paymaster with rank of major in the State militia.

On November 4, 1884, Price was elected to the United States House of Representatives. On March 4, 1885, he presented credentials as a Republican Member-elect to the Forty-ninth Congress. He served from March 4, 1885, to January 25, 1887. The 1884 results were successfully contested by Charles H. Page, and the seat was declared vacant because of election irregularities. Page then won a special election in February 1887 and served from February 1887 until the end of the term on March 3, 1887. Pirce was also a Justice of the Peace and an assessor of taxes in Johnston, Rhode Island.

== Death and burial ==
Pirce died in Johnston on March 5, 1891, and was interred at Swan Point Cemetery in Providence.

== Sources ==
- United States Congress. "William A. Pirce (id: P000365)". Biographical Directory of the United States Congress.

U.S. House of Representatives
Preceded by Nathan F. Dixon III	Member of the U.S. House of Representatives from Rhode Island's 2nd congressional district 1885–1887	Succeeded by Charles H. Page
