= Rhode Island's 2nd congressional district =

U.S. House district for Rhode Island

Coordinates: 41°34′11″N 71°36′56″W

- Interactive map of district boundaries since January 3, 2023
- Representative: Seth Magaziner; D–Cranston
- Distribution: 84.5% urban; 15.5% rural
- Population (2025): 558,070
- Median household income: $94,184
- Ethnicity: 73.5% White; 14.6% Hispanic; 3.8% Two or more races; 3.8% Black; 3.3% Asian; 0.9% other
- Cook PVI: D+4

Rhode Island's 2nd congressional district is a congressional district located in the southern and western part of the U.S. state of Rhode Island. The district is currently represented by Democrat Seth Magaziner, who has represented the district since January 2023.

== Composition ==
Kent County (5)
All 5 municipalities

Providence County (7)

Burrillville, Cranston, Foster, Glocester, Johnston, Providence (part; also 1st), Scituate

Washington County (9)
All 9 municipalities

=== Historical district boundaries ===
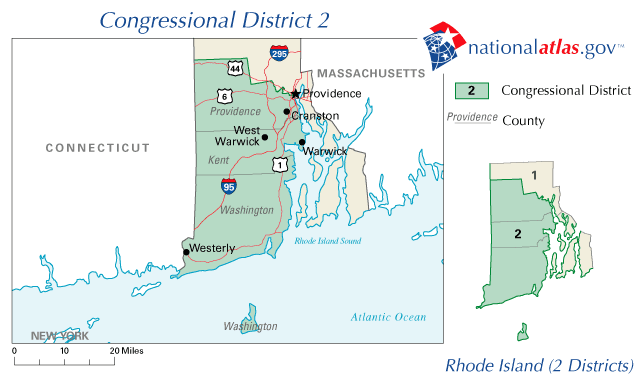
2003–2013

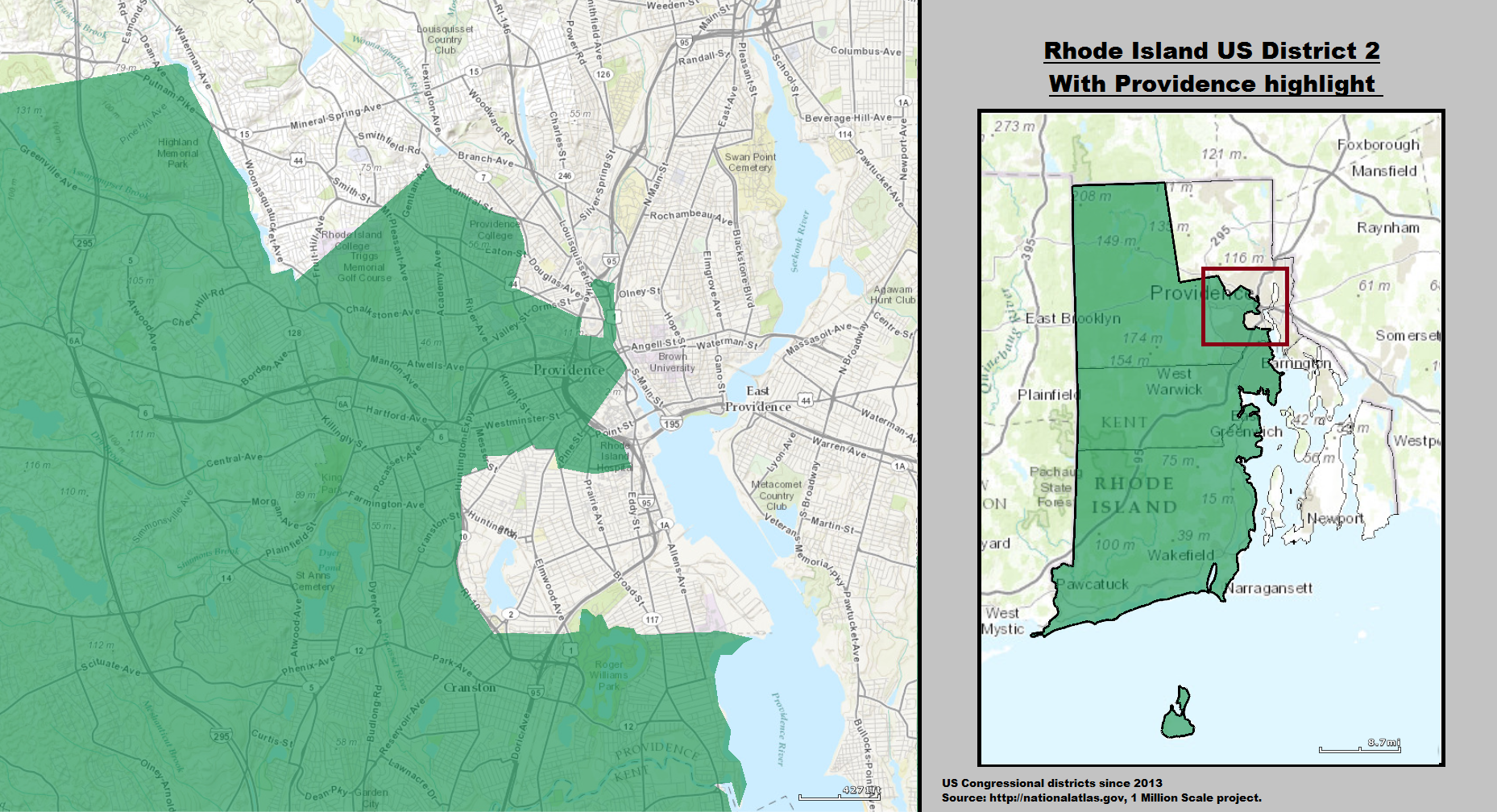
2013–2023

== Recent election results from statewide races ==
Year	Office	Results
2008	President	Obama 60% - 38%
2012	President	Obama 61% - 39%
2014	Governor	Fung 40% - 36%
2016	President	Clinton 50% - 43%
2018	Senate	Whitehouse 58% - 42%
2018	Governor	Raimondo 47% - 42%
2018	Lt. Governor	McKee 58% - 33%
2018	Secretary of State	Gorbea 64% - 36%
2018	General Treasurer	Magaziner 61% - 39%
2020	President	Biden 56% - 42%
2020	Senate	Reed 63% - 37%
2022	Governor	McKee 55% - 42%
2022	Lt. Governor	Matos 47.4% - 46.9%
2022	Secretary of State	Amore 56% - 44%
2022	Attorney General	Neronha 58% - 42%
2022	General Treasurer	Diossa 51% - 49%
2024	President	Harris 52% - 45%
2024	Senate	Whitehouse 56% - 43%

== List of members representing the district ==
Member	Party	Years	Cong ress	Electoral history
District established March 4, 1843
Elisha R. Potter (Kingston)	Law and Order	March 4, 1843 – March 3, 1845	28th	Elected in 1843. Lost re-election.
Lemuel H. Arnold (Wakefield)	Whig	March 4, 1845 – March 3, 1847	29th	Elected in 1845. Retired.
Benjamin Babock Thurston (Hopkinton)	Democratic	March 4, 1847 – March 3, 1849	30th	Elected in 1847. Lost re-election.
Nathan F. Dixon (Westerly)	Whig	March 4, 1849 – March 3, 1851	31st	Elected in 1849. Retired.
Benjamin Babock Thurston (Hopkinton)	Democratic	March 4, 1851 – March 3, 1855	32nd 33rd 34th	Elected in 1851. Re-elected in 1853. Re-elected in 1855. Retired.
Benjamin Babock Thurston (Hopkinton)	Know Nothing	March 4, 1855 – March 3, 1857	32nd 33rd 34th	Elected in 1851. Re-elected in 1853. Re-elected in 1855. Retired.
William Daniel Brayton (Warwick)	Republican	March 4, 1857 – March 3, 1861	35th 36th	Elected in 1857. Re-elected in 1859. Lost re-election.
George H. Browne (Providence)	Constitutional Union	March 4, 1861 – March 3, 1863	37th	Elected in 1861. Lost re-election.
Nathan F. Dixon (Westerly)	Republican	March 4, 1863 – March 3, 1871	38th 39th 40th 41st	Elected in 1863. Re-elected in 1865. Re-elected in 1867. Re-elected in 1868. Retired.
James M. Pendleton (Westerly)	Republican	March 4, 1871 – March 3, 1875	42nd 43rd	Elected in 1870. Re-elected in 1872. Lost re-election.
Latimer Whipple Ballou (Woonsocket)	Republican	March 4, 1875 – March 3, 1881	44th 45th 46th	Elected in 1874. Re-elected in 1876. Re-elected in 1878. Retired.
Jonathan Chace (Providence)	Republican	March 4, 1881 – January 26, 1885	47th 48th	Elected in 1880. Re-elected in 1882. Retired to run for U.S. senator and resigned when elected.
Vacant		January 26, 1885 – February 12, 1885	48th	
Nathan F. Dixon III (Westerly)	Republican	February 12, 1885 – March 3, 1885	48th	Elected to finish Chace's term. Retired.
William Almy Pirce (Olneyville)	Republican	March 4, 1885 – January 25, 1887	49th	Elected in 1884. Seat declared vacant due to election irregularities.
Vacant		January 25, 1887 – February 21, 1887	49th	
Charles H. Page (Scituate)	Democratic	February 21, 1887 – March 3, 1887	49th	Elected to finish Pirce's term. Retired.
Warren O. Arnold (Gloucester)	Republican	March 4, 1887 – March 3, 1891	50th 51st	Elected in 1886. Re-elected in 1888. Withdrew when neither candidate received a majority in 1890.
Charles H. Page (Scituate)	Democratic	March 4, 1891 – March 3, 1893	52nd	Elected in 1890.
Vacant		March 4, 1893 – April 5, 1893	53rd	Seat declared vacant due to failure of candidates to attain majority vote in 1892 election.
Charles H. Page (Providence)	Democratic	April 5, 1893 – March 3, 1895	53rd	Elected to finish vacant term. Retired.
Warren O. Arnold (Chepachet)	Republican	March 4, 1895 – March 3, 1897	54th	Elected in 1894. Retired.
Adin B. Capron (Stillwater)	Republican	March 4, 1897 – March 3, 1911	55th 56th 57th 58th 59th 60th 61st	Elected in 1896. Re-elected in 1898. Re-elected in 1900. Re-elected in 1902. Re-elected in 1904. Re-elected in 1906. Re-elected in 1908. Retired.
George H. Utter (Westerly)	Republican	March 4, 1911 – November 3, 1912	62nd	Elected in 1910. Died.
Vacant		November 3, 1912 – March 3, 1913	62nd	
Peter G. Gerry (Providence)	Democratic	March 4, 1913 – March 3, 1915	63rd	Elected in 1912. Lost re-election.
Walter Russell Stiness (Cowesett)	Republican	March 4, 1915 – March 3, 1923	64th 65th 66th 67th	Elected in 1914. Re-elected in 1916. Re-elected in 1918. Re-elected in 1920. Retired.
Richard S. Aldrich (Warwick)	Republican	March 4, 1923 – March 3, 1933	68th 69th 70th 71st 72nd	Elected in 1922. Re-elected in 1924. Re-elected in 1926. Re-elected in 1928. Re-elected in 1930. Retired.
John Matthew O'Connell (Westerly)	Democratic	March 4, 1933 – January 3, 1939	73rd 74th 75th	Elected in 1932. Re-elected in 1934. Re-elected in 1936. Retired.
Harry Sandager (Cranston)	Republican	January 3, 1939 – January 3, 1941	76th	Elected in 1938. Lost re-election.
John E. Fogarty (Harmony)	Democratic	January 3, 1941 – December 7, 1944	77th 78th	Elected in 1940. Re-elected in 1942. Re-elected in 1944 but resigned until next term began to enter U.S. Navy.
Vacant		December 7, 1944 – February 7, 1945	78th 79th	
John E. Fogarty (Harmony)	Democratic	February 7, 1945 – January 10, 1967	79th 80th 81st 82nd 83rd 84th 85th 86th 87th 88th 89th 90th	Re-elected in 1946. Re-elected in 1948. Re-elected in 1950. Re-elected in 1952. Re-elected in 1954. Re-elected in 1956. Re-elected in 1958. Re-elected in 1960. Re-elected in 1962. Re-elected in 1964. Re-elected in 1966. Died.
Vacant		January 10, 1967 – March 28, 1967	90th	
Robert Tiernan (Warwick)	Democratic	March 28, 1967 – January 3, 1975	90th 91st 92nd 93rd	Elected to finish Fogarty's term. Re-elected in 1968. Re-elected in 1970. Re-elected in 1972. Lost renomination.
Edward Beard (Cranston)	Democratic	January 3, 1975 – January 3, 1981	94th 95th 96th	Elected in 1974. Re-elected in 1976. Re-elected in 1978. Lost re-election.
Claudine Schneider (Narragansett)	Republican	January 3, 1981 – January 3, 1991	97th 98th 99th 100th 101st	Elected in 1980. Re-elected in 1982. Re-elected in 1984. Re-elected in 1986. Re-elected in 1988. Retired to run for U.S. Senator.
Jack Reed (Cranston)	Democratic	January 3, 1991 – January 3, 1997	102nd 103rd 104th	Elected in 1990. Re-elected in 1992. Re-elected in 1994. Retired to run for U.S. Senator.
Robert Weygand (North Kingstown)	Democratic	January 3, 1997 – January 3, 2001	105th 106th	Elected in 1996. Re-elected in 1998. Retired to run for U.S. Senator.
James Langevin (Warwick)	Democratic	January 3, 2001 – January 3, 2023	107th 108th 109th 110th 111th 112th 113th 114th 115th 116th 117th	Elected in 2000. Re-elected in 2002. Re-elected in 2004. Re-elected in 2006. Re-elected in 2008. Re-elected in 2010. Re-elected in 2012. Re-elected in 2014. Re-elected in 2016. Re-elected in 2018. Re-elected in 2020; Retired.
Seth Magaziner (Cranston)	Democratic	January 3, 2023 – present	118th 119th	Elected in 2022. Re-elected in 2024. Re-elected in 2026.

== Election history ==
=== 2012 ===
Rhode Island's 2nd congressional district, 2012
Party	Candidate	Votes	%
Democratic	James Langevin (incumbent)	124,067	55.7
Republican	Michael G. Riley	78,189	35.1
Independent	Abel G. Collins	20,212	9.1
n/a	Write-ins	192	0.1
Total votes		222,660	100.0
Democratic hold			

=== 2014 ===
Rhode Island's 2nd congressional district, 2014
Party	Candidate	Votes	%
Democratic	James Langevin (incumbent)	105,716	62.2
Republican	Rhue Reis	63,844	37.6
n/a	Write-ins	344	0.2
Total votes		169,904	100.0
Democratic hold			

=== 2016 ===
Rhode Island's 2nd congressional district, 2016
Party	Candidate	Votes	%
Democratic	James Langevin (incumbent)	133,108	58.1
Republican	Rhue R. Reis	70,301	30.7
Independent	Jeffrey C. Johnson	16,253	7.1
Independent	Salvatore G. Caiozzo	8,942	3.9
n/a	Write-ins	544	0.2
Total votes		229,148	100.0
Democratic hold			

=== 2018 ===
Rhode Island's 2nd congressional district, 2018
Party	Candidate	Votes	%
Democratic	James Langevin (incumbent)	126,476	63.5
Republican	Sal Caiozzo	72,271	36.3
n/a	Write-ins	450	0.2
Total votes		199,197	100.0
Democratic hold			

=== 2020 ===
Rhode Island's 2nd congressional district, 2020
Party	Candidate	Votes	%
Democratic	James Langevin (incumbent)	154,086	58.2
Republican	Robert Lancia	109,894	41.5
Write-in		577	0.2
Total votes		264,557	100.0
Democratic hold			

=== 2022 ===
Rhode Island's 2nd congressional district, 2022
Party	Candidate	Votes	%
Democratic	Seth Magaziner	100,919	50.4
Republican	Allan Fung	93,637	46.8
Moderate	William Gilbert	5,454	2.7
Write-in		199	0.1
Total votes		200,209	100.0
Democratic hold			

=== 2024 ===
Rhode Island's 2nd congressional district, 2024
Party	Candidate	Votes	%
Democratic	Seth Magaziner (incumbent)	153,439	58.2
Republican	Steve Corvi	109,381	41.5
Write-in		660	0.2
Total votes		263,480	100.0
Democratic hold			

== See also ==
- Rhode Island's congressional districts
- List of United States congressional districts
