= James Brown Mason =

American politician

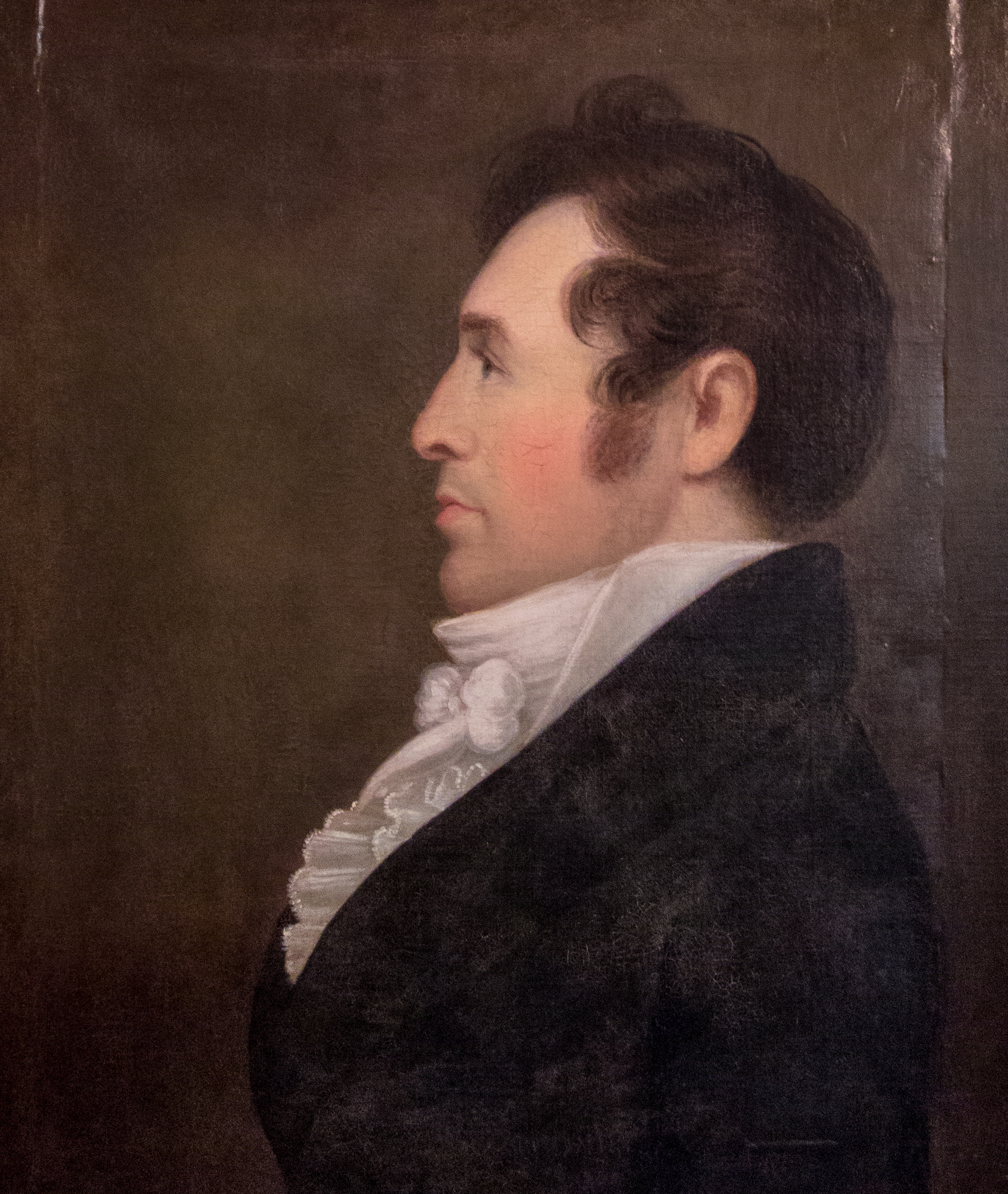

Member of the U.S. House of Representatives from Rhode Island's at-large district
- In office March 4, 1815 – March 3, 1819
- Preceded by: Elisha Reynolds Potter
- Succeeded by: Nathaniel Hazard

Personal details
- Born: January 28, 1775 Thompson, Connecticut Colony, British America
- Died: August 31, 1819 (aged 44) Providence, Rhode Island, U.S.
- Resting place: North Burial Ground
- Party: Federalist
- Spouse: Alice Brown (m. 1800)
- Parent(s): John Mason; Rosanna Brown Mason
- Education: Brown University
- Occupation: Physician, politician

James Brown Mason (January 28, 1775 – August 31, 1819) was an American medical doctor and legislator who served in the Rhode Island House of Representatives from 1804 to 1814, where he was speaker from 1812 to 1814. Elected to Congress in November 1814, he represented one of Rhode Island's two at-large congressional districts from 1815 until 1819.

== Early life ==
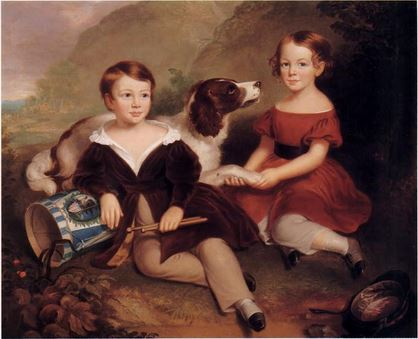
The Grosvenor Boys, Mason's nephews, by James Sullivan Lincoln

Mason was born on January 28, 1775, in the small rural town of Thompson in the Connecticut Colony. He was the son of John and Rose Anna (née Brown) Mason.

As a young man, James pursued classical studies and graduated from Rhode Island College (the future Brown University) in 1791. He studied medicine and was admitted to practice.

== Career ==
Mason moved to Charleston, South Carolina, where he practiced medicine from 1795 to 1798. While in South Carolina, he met and married his first wife. Upon her death in 1798, he returned to Rhode Island.

In Providence, Mason engaged in mercantile pursuits between 1798 and 1819. Starting in 1798, Mason engaged in business in Providence with his brother-in-law, John Brown. He served as a trustee of Brown University from 1804 to 1819.

=== Political career ===
He served as member of the Rhode Island House of Representatives from 1804 to 1814 and served as Speaker of the House from February 1812 to May 1814.

Mason was elected as a Federalist to the Fourteenth and Fifteenth Congresses (March 4, 1815 – March 3, 1819). He was not a candidate for renomination in 1818 to the Sixteenth Congress.

== Personal life ==
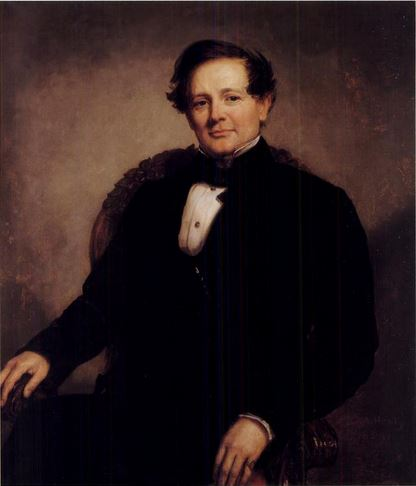
Dr. William Grosvenor, Mason's son-in-law, by George Peter Alexander Healy

On July 16, 1800, Mason married Alice Brown (1777–1823), the youngest daughter of John Brown and Sarah (née Smith) Brown. Her father was a wealthy merchant, slave trader, and statesman from Providence, and a founder of Brown University. James and Alice's children were:

- Abby Mason (1800–1822), who married Nicholas Brown III (1792–1859) in 1820
- Zerviah Mason (1801–1802), who died in infancy
- Zerviah Mason (1803–1812), who died in childhood
- Sarah Brown Mason (1804–1864), who married first George Benjamin Ruggles (1804–1833) in 1825. After his death, she married secondly to Levi Curtis Eaton (1812–1852)
- Rosa Anna Mason (1817–1872), who married Dr. William Grosvenor (1810–1888)

Six months after leaving Congress, Mason died in Providence at the age of 44 and was interred in North Burial Ground.

U.S. House of Representatives
Preceded by Elisha R. Potter	Member of the U.S. House of Representatives from Rhode Island's at-large congressional district 1815-1819	Succeeded by Nathaniel Hazard
