= Nathaniel Hazard =

American politician

Member of the U.S. House of Representatives from Rhode Island's at-large district
- In office March 4, 1819 – December 17, 1820
- Preceded by: James B. Mason
- Succeeded by: Job Durfee

Personal details
- Born: 1776 Newport, Rhode Island
- Died: December 17, 1820 (aged 43–44) Washington, D.C.
- Resting place: Congressional Cemetery
- Party: Democratic-Republican
- Education: Brown University

Nathaniel Hazard (1776 – December 17, 1820) was a U.S. representative from Rhode Island.

Born in Newport, Rhode Island, Hazard was graduated from Brown University in 1792. He served as a member of the Rhode Island House of Representatives and served as speaker.

Hazard was elected as a Republican to the Sixteenth Congress and served from March 4, 1819, until his death in Washington, D.C., on December 17, 1820. He was interred in the Congressional Cemetery.

Nathaniel wrote to Alexander Hamilton on a few occasions in New York where he brings to Hamilton's attention of the cities problems and concerns.

== See also ==
- List of members of the United States Congress who died in office (1790–1899)

U.S. House of Representatives
Preceded by James B. Mason	Member of the U.S. House of Representatives from Rhode Island's at-large congressional district 1819-1820	Succeeded by Job Durfee
