= Benjamin T. Eames =

American politician

Benjamin Tucker Eames
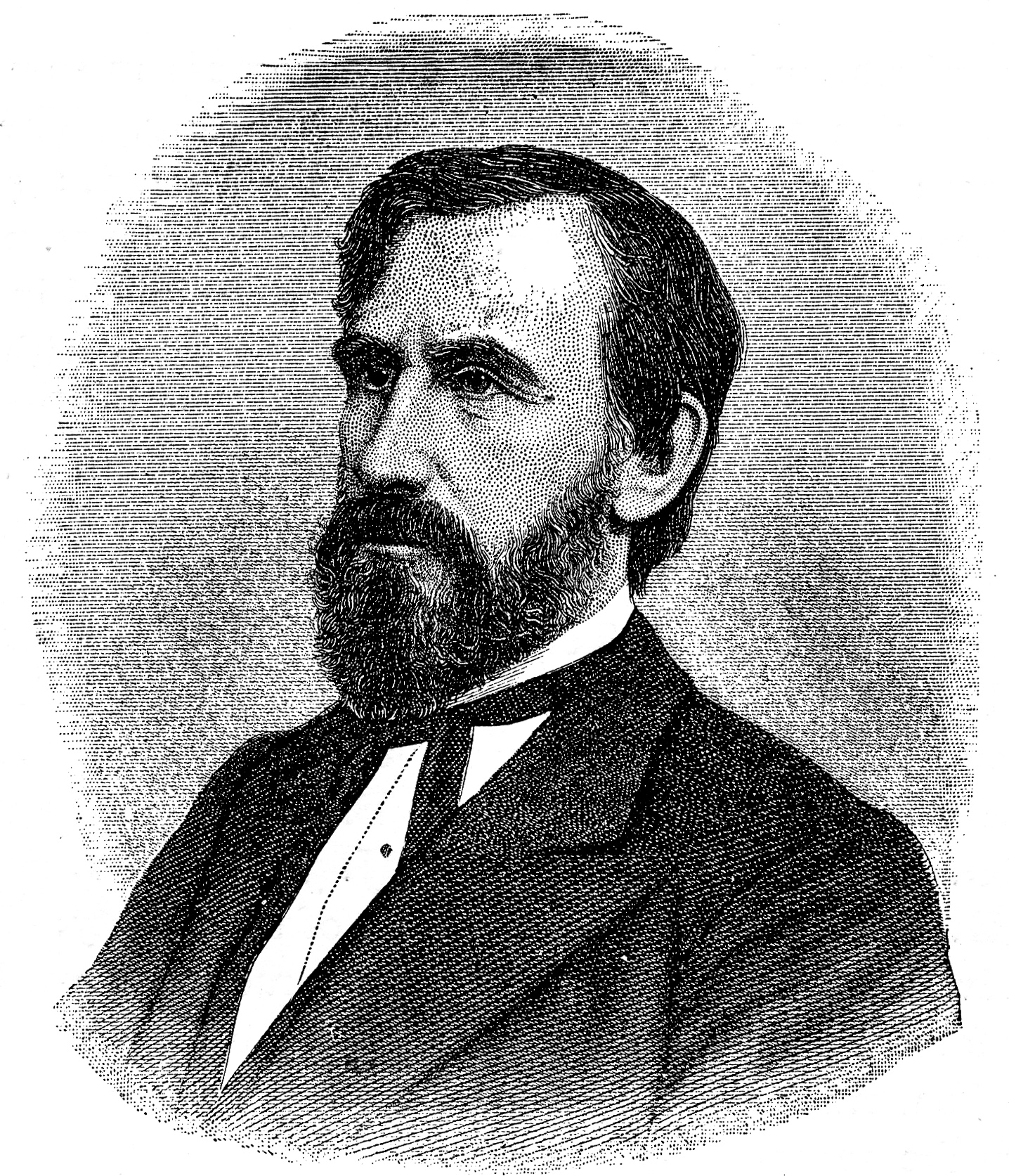

Member of the U.S. House of Representatives from Rhode Island's 1st district
- In office March 4, 1871 – March 3, 1879
- Preceded by: Thomas Jenckes
- Succeeded by: Nelson W. Aldrich

Member of the Rhode Island House of Representatives
- In office: 1859-1860; 1868-1869; 1879-1881

Member of the Rhode Island Senate
- In office: 1854-1857; 1863-1864; 1884-1885

Personal details
- Born: June 4, 1818 Dedham, Massachusetts, U.S.
- Died: October 6, 1901 (aged 83) East Greenwich, Rhode Island, U.S.
- Resting place: Swan Point Cemetery
- Party: Republican
- Education: Yale College
- Occupation: Lawyer

Benjamin Tucker Eames (June 4, 1818 – October 6, 1901) was a U.S. representative from Rhode Island.

Born in Dedham, Massachusetts, Eames attended the common schools of Providence, Rhode Island, and academies in Massachusetts and Connecticut. He was employed as a bookkeeper for several years. He graduated from Yale College in 1843, where he was a member of Skull and Bones. He engaged as a teacher in the academy at North Attleboro, studying law at the same time. He was admitted to the bar in 1845 and commenced practice in Providence, Rhode Island. He served as recording and reading clerk of the Rhode Island House of Representatives 1845–1850, and was a member of the Rhode Island Senate 1854–1857, 1863, and again in 1864. He was one of the commissioners on the revision of the public laws of the State of Rhode Island in 1857. He served in the Rhode Island House of Representatives in 1859, 1860, 1868, and 1869.

Eames was elected as a Republican to the Forty-second and to the three succeeding Congresses (March 4, 1871 – March 4, 1879). He served as chairman of the Committee on Private Land Claims (Forty-third Congress). He was not a candidate for renomination. He was again a member of the Rhode Island House of Representatives 1879–1881, and served again in the Rhode Island Senate in 1884 and 1885. He died in East Greenwich, Rhode Island, October 6, 1901. He was interred in Swan Point Cemetery in Providence, Rhode Island.

U.S. House of Representatives
Preceded by Thomas Jenckes	Member of the U.S. House of Representatives from Rhode Island's 1st congressional district 1871–1879	Succeeded by Nelson W. Aldrich
