= Latimer W. Ballou =

American politician (1812–1900)

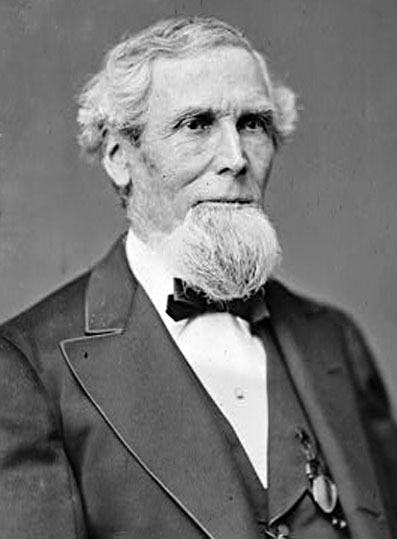
- Ballou, 1865–1880

Member of the U.S. House of Representatives from Rhode Island's 2nd district
- In office March 4, 1875 – March 3, 1881
- Preceded by: James M. Pendleton
- Succeeded by: Jonathan Chace

Personal details
- Born: March 1, 1812 Cumberland, Rhode Island, U.S.
- Died: May 9, 1900 (aged 88) Woonsocket, Rhode Island, U.S.

Latimer Whipple Ballou (March 1, 1812 – May 9, 1900) was a U.S. representative from Rhode Island.

== Biography ==
Latimer Whipple Ballou was born in Cumberland, Rhode Island on March 1, 1812. He attended the public schools and the local academies in his native town. He moved to Cambridge, Massachusetts, in 1828 and learned the art of printing at the University Press. He was instrumental in establishing the Cambridge Press in 1835 and continued in the printing business until 1842, when he moved to Woonsocket, Rhode Island. He engaged in banking in 1850. He was active in the organization of the Republican Party in 1856. He served as delegate to the Republican National Convention at Philadelphia in 1872.

Ballou was elected as a Republican to the Forty-fourth, Forty-fifth and Forty-sixth Congresses (March 4, 1875 – March 3, 1881). He declined to be a candidate for renomination in 1880. He engaged in his former business pursuits until his death in Woonsocket, Rhode Island, May 9, 1900. He was interred in Oak Hill Cemetery.

U.S. House of Representatives
Preceded by James M. Pendleton	Member of the U.S. House of Representatives from Rhode Island's 2nd congressional district 1875–1881	Succeeded by Jonathan Chace
