= Nathan F. Dixon III =

American politician (1847–1897)

Nathan Fellows Dixon III
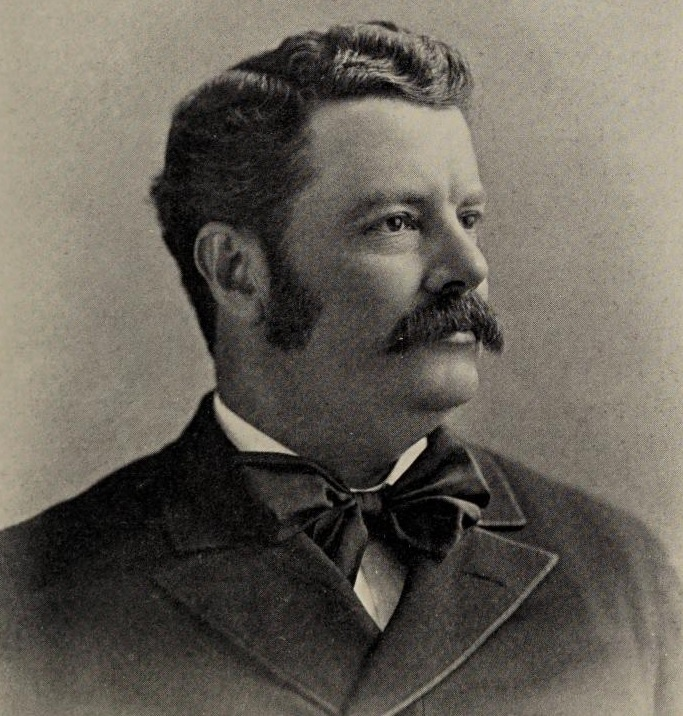
- From 1899's The Harvey Book

United States Senator from Rhode Island
- In office April 10, 1889 – March 3, 1895
- Preceded by: Jonathan Chace
- Succeeded by: George P. Wetmore

Member of the U.S. House of Representatives from Rhode Island's 2nd district
- In office February 12, 1885 – March 3, 1885
- Preceded by: Jonathan Chace
- Succeeded by: William Almy Pirce

Member of the Rhode Island Senate from Westerly
- In office 1886–1889
- Preceded by: Albert L. Chester
- Succeeded by: George H. Utter

United States Attorney for the District of Rhode Island
- In office March 1, 1877 – March 22, 1885
- Preceded by: John A. Gardner
- Succeeded by: David S. Baker Jr.

Personal details
- Born: August 28, 1847 Westerly, Rhode Island, US
- Died: November 8, 1897 (aged 50) Westerly, Rhode Island, US
- Resting place: River Bend Cemetery, Westerly, Rhode Island, US
- Party: Republican
- Spouse: Grace McClure (m. 1873)
- Education: Brown University; Albany Law School
- Profession: Attorney

Nathan Fellows Dixon III (August 28, 1847 – November 8, 1897) was a United States representative and Senator from Rhode Island.

== Early life ==
Dixon was born in Westerly, Rhode Island on August 28, 1847. He attended the local schools and Phillips Academy in Andover, Massachusetts. Dixon graduated from Brown University with a AB degree in 1869, studied law with his father, then completed his legal studies at Albany Law School (Albany, New York) in 1871. While at Brown, Dixon became a member of the Theta Delta Chi fraternity.

== Legal and business career ==
Dixon was admitted to the bar in 1871, commenced practice in Westerly, and grew his legal business to include Rhode Island, Connecticut, and New York. As a partner in the firm of Dixon & Perrin, Dixon became a noted corporate attorney and his clients included the New York, Providence and Boston Railroad. From 1877 to 1885 he was United States Attorney for the District of Rhode Island.

Dixon was also active in several businesses, including serving as president of the Dixon Granite Works and the Washington National Bank of Westerly. In addition, he served on the board of directors of several corporations, including the Pawcatuck Valley Railway and Providence & Stonington Steamship Company. Dixon also participated in Freemasonry, and was a member of the lodge in Westerly, as well Stonington's Palmer Chapter of the Royal Arch Masons and Westerly's commandery of the Knights Templar.

== Political career ==
Dixon was elected as a Republican to the Forty-eighth Congress to fill the vacancy caused by the resignation of Jonathan Chace and served from February 12 to March 3, 1885; he was not a candidate for re-nomination. Dixon was a member of the Rhode Island Senate from 1886 to 1889. He was elected to the U.S. Senate to fill the vacancy caused by the resignation of Jonathan Chace and served from April 10, 1889, to March 3, 1895; he was not a candidate for reelection. While in the Senate he was chairman of the Committee on Patents (52nd Congress).

== Death and burial ==
After leaving the Senate, Dixon resumed the practice of law and his business and banking interests, and maintained a farm on which he bred cattle as a hobby. In addition, he was a member of the state Board of Charities and Corrections, and a member of the commission created to revise the state constitution.

Dixon died in Westerly on November 8, 1897. He was buried at River Bend Cemetery in Westerly.

== Family ==
Nathan Fellows Dixon III was the son of Representative Nathan F. Dixon II and Harriet Palmer Swan Dixon. He was a grandson of Senator Nathan F. Dixon I. In 1873, he married Grace McClure of Albany, New York. They remained married until his death and had no children.

U.S. House of Representatives
Preceded by Jonathan Chace	Member of the U.S. House of Representatives from Rhode Island's 2nd congressional district February 12, 1885 – March 3, 1885	Succeeded by William Almy Price
U.S. Senate
Preceded by Jonathan Chace	U.S. senator (Class 2) from Rhode Island; April 10, 1889 – March 3, 1895; Served alongside: Nelson W. Aldrich	Succeeded by George P. Wetmore
