= Benjamin B. Thurston =

American politician (1804–1886)

Benjamin Babock Thurston

Member of the U.S. House of Representatives from Rhode Island's 2nd district
- In office March 4, 1851 – March 3, 1857
- Preceded by: Nathan F. Dixon II
- Succeeded by: William Daniel Brayton
- In office March 4, 1847 – March 3, 1849
- Preceded by: Lemuel H. Arnold
- Succeeded by: Nathan F. Dixon II

Member of the Rhode Island House of Representatives
- In office 1831-1837

Personal details
- Born: June 29, 1804 Hopkinton, Rhode Island, US
- Died: May 17, 1886 (aged 81) New London, Connecticut, US
- Party: Democratic
- Other political affiliations: Know Nothing Party

Benjamin Babock Thurston (June 29, 1804 – May 17, 1886) was a U.S. representative from Rhode Island.

Born in Hopkinton, Rhode Island, Thurston attended the common schools, and later engaged in mercantile pursuits. He served as member of the Rhode Island House of Representatives 1831–1837, and as Lieutenant Governor of Rhode Island from 1837 to 1838 serving under Governor John B. Francis.

Thurston was elected as a Democrat to the Thirtieth Congress (March 4, 1847 – March 3, 1849). He was an unsuccessful candidate for reelection in 1849 to the Thirty-first Congress.

Thurston was elected as a Democrat to the Thirty-second and Thirty-third Congresses and as a candidate of the American Party to the Thirty-fourth Congress (March 4, 1851 – March 3, 1857). He served as chairman of the Committee on Expenditures in the Department of the Treasury (Thirty-second Congress), Committee on Patents (Thirty-third Congress), Committee on Accounts (Thirty-fourth Congress). He was not a candidate for renomination in 1857.

After leaving Congress, Thurston moved to New London, Connecticut, where he served as member of the board of aldermen in 1862 and 1863. He served as member of the Connecticut House of Representatives in 1869 and 1870. He resumed mercantile pursuits. He died in New London, Connecticut, May 17, 1886. He was interred in Cedar Grove Cemetery.

== Sources ==
- United States Congress. "Benjamin B. Thurston (id: T000255)". Biographical Directory of the United States Congress.

Political offices
Preceded by Jeffrey Hazard	Lieutenant Governor of Rhode Island; 1837–1838	Succeeded by Joseph Childs
U.S. House of Representatives
Preceded by Lemuel H. Arnold	Member of the U.S. House of Representatives from Rhode Island's 2nd congressional district 1847–1849	Succeeded by Nathan F. Dixon II
Preceded by Nathan F. Dixon II	Member of the U.S. House of Representatives from Rhode Island's 2nd congressional district 1851–1857	Succeeded by William Daniel Brayton
