= Jonathan Chace =

American politician

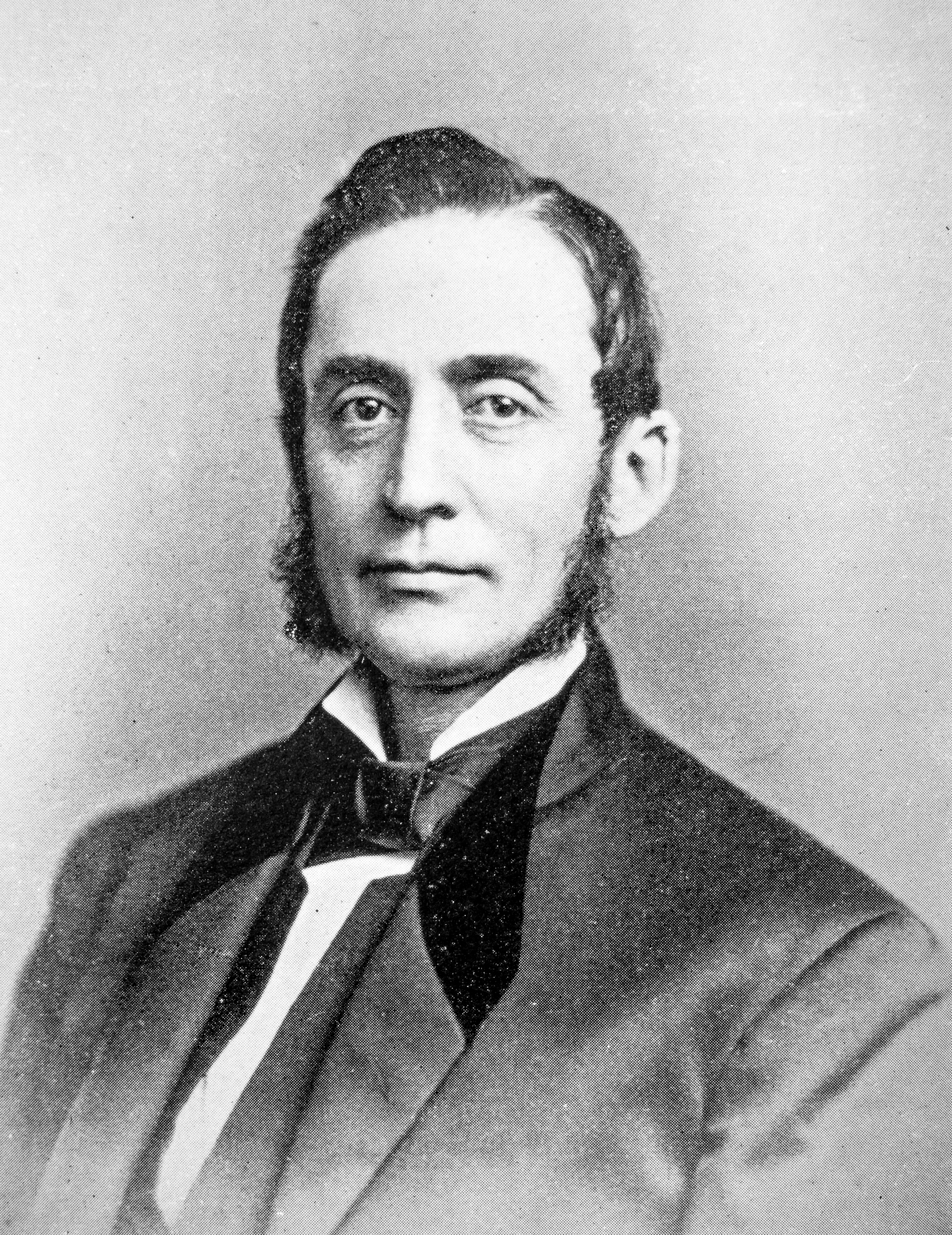

United States Senator from Rhode Island
- In office January 20, 1885 – April 9, 1889
- Preceded by: William P. Sheffield
- Succeeded by: Nathan F. Dixon, III

Member of the U.S. House of Representatives from Rhode Island's 2nd district
- In office March 4, 1881 – January 26, 1885
- Preceded by: Latimer Whipple Ballou
- Succeeded by: Nathan F. Dixon, III

Member of the Rhode Island Senate
- In office 1876-1877

Personal details
- Born: July 22, 1829 Fall River, Massachusetts, U.S.
- Died: June 30, 1917 (aged 87) Providence, Rhode Island, U.S.
- Resting place: North Burial Ground
- Party: Republican

Jonathan Chace (July 22, 1829 – June 30, 1917) was a United States representative and senator from Rhode Island.

== Biography ==
Born at Fall River, Massachusetts, the son of Harvey Chace and the grandson of Oliver Chace. In 1854, he married Jane C. Moon, and they had three children: Anna H., Elizabeth M. and Susan A. (the latter deceased). He was also the nephew of famed 19th century abolitionist Elizabeth Buffum Chace and had himself been active in the Underground Railroad during his time in Philadelphia, where he operated a dry goods store.

He attended the public schools and Friends' School at Providence. He moved to Central Falls, Rhode Island and engaged in cotton manufacturing; he was a member of the Rhode Island Senate in 1876-1877 and was elected as a Republican to the Forty-seventh and Forty-eighth Congresses and served from March 4, 1881, to January 26, 1885, when he resigned.

Chace was elected as a Republican to the U.S. Senate to fill the vacancy caused by the death of Henry B. Anthony; he was reelected in 1888 and served from January 20, 1885, to April 9, 1889, when he resigned. While in the Senate he was chairman of the Committee on Civil Service and Retrenchment (Fiftieth and Fifty-first Congresses), and sponsored a bill presaging the International Copyright Act of 1891, sometimes referred to as the Chace Act. He was president of the Phoenix National Bank of Providence, Rhode Island, and was interested in several manufacturing enterprises.

Chace died in Providence in 1917, and was interred in the North Burial Ground.

== See also ==
- Oliver Chace
- Elizabeth Buffum Chace

U.S. House of Representatives
Preceded by Latimer Whipple Ballou	Member of the U.S. House of Representatives from Rhode Island's 2nd congressional district 1881–1885	Succeeded by Nathan F. Dixon, III
U.S. Senate
Preceded by William P. Sheffield	United States Senator (Class 2) from Rhode Island; 1885–1889; Served alongside: Nelson W. Aldrich	Succeeded by Nathan F. Dixon, III
