= Robert Tiernan =

American politician (1929–2014)

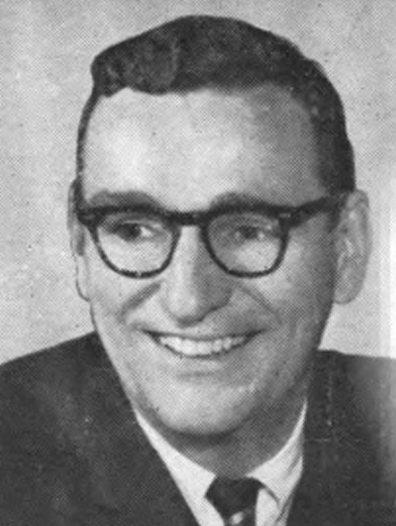

Member of the U.S. House of Representatives from Rhode Island's 2nd district
- In office March 28, 1967 – January 3, 1975
- Preceded by: John E. Fogarty
- Succeeded by: Edward Beard

Member of the Rhode Island State Senate
- In office 1960–1967

Personal details
- Born: February 24, 1929 Providence, Rhode Island
- Died: October 15, 2014 (aged 85) Providence, Rhode Island
- Party: Democratic
- Spouse: Dorothy A. Tiernan
- Children: Michael M. Tiernan; Robert O. Tiernan Jr. Christopher P. Tiernan
- Profession: Businessman politician

Robert Owens Tiernan (February 24, 1929 – October 15, 2014) was an American lawyer and politician from Rhode Island. He served in the Rhode Island State Senate and was a member of the United States House of Representatives.

== Early life ==
Tiernan was born in Providence, Rhode Island, and attended La Salle Academy. He earned his Bachelor of Arts from Providence College in 1953 and his Juris Doctor from Catholic University Law School in 1956. He was admitted to the bar in 1956 and began practicing law.

== Political career ==
He began his political career as a Democratic member of the Rhode Island State Senate in 1960 and served until 1967. In 1967, he was elected to the Ninetieth Congress by special election to fill the vacancy caused by the death of United States Representative John E. Fogarty. He was reelected to the Ninety-first, Ninety-second and Ninety-third Congresses, serving from March 28, 1967, to January 3, 1975. He was an unsuccessful candidate for renomination to the Ninety-fourth Congress in 1974.

From April 1975 to November 1981, he was a member of the Federal Election Commission. He served as chairman of the Commission in 1980, and after leaving the Commission he resumed the practice of law in Providence.

== Family life ==
Tiernan and his wife Dorothy A. Tiernan have three sons: Michael M. Tiernan, Robert O. Tiernan Jr., and Christopher P. Tiernan. His wife Dorothy died in 2001.

He was a resident of South Kingstown, Rhode Island, until his death on October 15, 2014, at the Philip Hulitar Inpatient Center in Providence, Rhode Island after a brief illness.

U.S. House of Representatives
Preceded by John E. Fogarty	Member of the U.S. House of Representatives from Rhode Island's 2nd congressional district 1967–1975	Succeeded by Edward Beard
