= Walter R. Stiness =

American politician (1854–1924)

Walter Russell Stiness
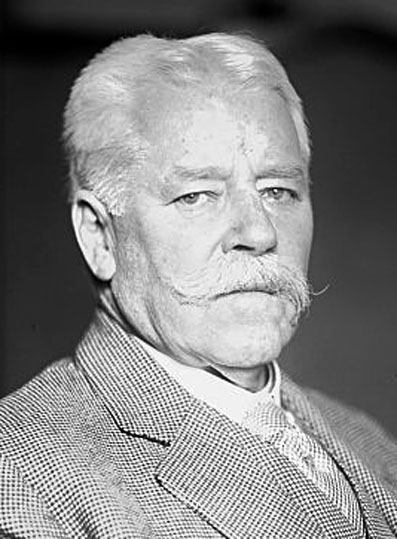

Member of the U.S. House of Representatives from Rhode Island's 2nd district
- In office March 4, 1915 – March 3, 1923
- Preceded by: Peter G. Gerry
- Succeeded by: Richard S. Aldrich

Member of the Rhode Island House of Representatives
- In office 1878–1881

Personal details
- Born: March 13, 1854 Smithfield, Rhode Island, U.S.
- Died: March 17, 1924 (aged 70) Warwick, Rhode Island, U.S.
- Resting place: Swan Point Cemetery
- Party: Republican
- Education: Boston University School of Law

Walter Russell Stiness (March 13, 1854 – March 17, 1924) was a U.S. Representative from Rhode Island.

Born in Smithfield, Rhode Island, Stiness attended the public schools and was a student at Brown University, Providence, Rhode Island, in 1873 and 1874. He served in the city council in 1875. He was graduated from Boston University School of Law in 1877. He was admitted to the bar the same year and commenced practice in Providence, Rhode Island. He served as member of the State house of representatives 1878–1881. He served as clerk of the justice court of Providence 1879–1885. He served as aide-de-camp on the staff of Gov. Augustus O. Bourn 1883–1885. State railroad commissioner 1888–1891. He served as assistant judge advocate general of Rhode Island 1888–1898. He served as judge advocate general 1898–1913. He served as member of the State senate 1904–1909. He served as chairman of the commission to revise the statutes of Rhode Island in 1909. United States attorney for the district of Rhode Island 1911–1914.

Stiness was elected as a Republican to the Sixty-fourth and to the three succeeding Congresses (March 4, 1915 – March 3, 1923). He was not a candidate for renomination in 1922. He lived in retirement in Warwick, Rhode Island, until his death there March 17, 1924. He was interred in Swan Point Cemetery, Providence, Rhode Island.

== Sources ==
- United States Congress. "Walter R. Stiness (id: S000927)". Biographical Directory of the United States Congress.

U.S. House of Representatives
Preceded by Peter G. Gerry	Member of the U.S. House of Representatives from Rhode Island's 2nd congressional district 1915–1923	Succeeded by Richard S. Aldrich
