= 12th Rhode Island Infantry Regiment =

- Active: October 18, 1862 to July 29, 1863
- Country: United States
- Allegiance: Union
- Branch: Infantry
- Engagements: Battle of Fredericksburg; Mud March

12th Rhode Island Infantry Regiment raised during the US Civil War saw service between Oct 1862 and Jul 1863.

== History ==
The 12th Rhode Island Infantry Regiment was organized at Providence and mustered for nine months from October 18, 1862. Left State for Washington, D. C., October 21. Attached to 1st Brigade, Casey's Division, Military District of Washington, to December, 1862. 1st Brigade, 2nd Division, 9th Army Corps, Army of the Potomac, to April, 1863. 1st Brigade, 2nd Division, Dept. Ohio, to May, 1863. 1st Brigade, 1st Division, 23rd Army Corps, Dept. Ohio, to July, 1863.

== Service ==
Camped at Arlington Heights and at Fairfax Seminary, Va., Defences of Washington, D. C., until December 1, 1862. Marched to Falmouth, Va., December 1–8. Battle of Fredericksburg, Va., December 12–15. Burnside's second Campaign, "Mud March," January 20–24, 1863. Moved to Newport News, Va., February 9, thence to Lexington, Ky., March 25–31. On duty at Lexington, Winchester, Boonsboro, Richmond, Paint Lick and Lancaster, Ky., until April 23. Moved to Crab Orchard April 23, and duty there until June 3. Marched from Nicholasville to Somerset June 3–9. On duty at Stigall's Ferry, Jamestown and guarded fords of the Cumberland River until July 5. Moved to Somerset July 5, thence to Crab Orchard, and started home July 11. On duty at Cincinnati, Ohio, July 15–19. Moved to Providence July 19–22. Finally mustered out July 29, 1863.

== Losses ==
Regiment lost during service 1 Officer and 11 Enlisted men killed and mortally wounded and 2 Officers and 45 Enlisted men by disease. Total 59.
