= 4th Rhode Island Infantry Regiment =

- Active: 1861 to October 15, 1864
- Country: United States
- Allegiance: Union
- Branch: Infantry
- Engagements: Battle of Roanoke Island; Battle of New Bern; Siege of Fort Macon; Battle of South Mountain; Battle of Antietam; Battle of Fredericksburg; Siege of Suffolk

Commanders
- Notable commanders: Isaac P. Rodman

4th Rhode Island Infantry Regiment was organized during the American Civil War from 1861 and 1864.

== History ==
Organized at Providence, 1861, the 4th Rhode Island Infantry Regiment left the state for Washington, D. C., October 2. At Camp Casey till November 28, and at Camp California till December 14. Mustered in October 30, 1861. Attached to Casey's Provisional Division, Army Potomac, October–November, 1861. Howard's Brigade, Sumner's Division, Army of the Potomac, to December, 1861. Parke's 3rd Brigade, Burnside's Expeditionary Corps, to April, 1862. 1st Brigade, 3rd Division, Dept. of North Carolina, to July, 1862. 2nd Brigade, 3rd Division, 9th Army Corps, Army Potomac, to January, 1863. 3rd Brigade, 3rd Division, 9th Army Corps, to April, 1863. 3rd Brigade, 2nd Division, 7th Army Corps, Dept. of Virginia, to July, 1863. 3rd Brigade, Getty's Division, at Portsmouth, Va., Dept. of Virginia and North Carolina, to January, 1864. 3rd Brigade, Heckman's Division, Portsmouth, Va., to March, 1864. Norfolk, Va., to April, 1864. District of St. Mary's Point, Lookout, Md., to July, 1864. 1st Brigade, 2nd Division, 9th Army Corps, Army Potomac, to October, 1864.

== Service ==
- At Edsall's Hill, Defences of Washington, D. C., December 14, 1861, to January 3, 1862.
- Moved to Annapolis, Md., January 3, 1862.
- Burnside's Expedition to Hatteras Inlet and Roanoke Island, N. C., January 7-February 8, 1862.
- Battle of Roanoke Island February 9.
- Duty at Roanoke Island till March 11.
- Advance on New Berne March 11–13.
- Battle of New Bern March 14.
- Siege of Fort Macon March 23-April 26.
- Bombardment and capture of Fort Macon April 25–26.
- Duty at Beaufort and New Berne till July.
- Moved to Newport News, Va., July 6–8, thence to Fredericksburg August 3–6, and duty there till August 31.
- Moved to Brook's Station, thence to Washington, D. C., August 31-September 3.
- Maryland Campaign September–October.
- Battles of South Mountain September 14, and Antietam September 16–17.
- Duty in Pleasant Valley, Md., till October 30.
- Advance to Falmouth, Va., October 30-November 19.
- Battle of Fredericksburg, Va., December 12–15.
- "Mud March" January 20–24, 1863.
- Moved to Newport News, Va., February 8, thence to Suffolk March 13.
- Siege of Suffolk April 12-May 4.
- Nansemond River May 4.
- Reconnaissance to the Chickahominy June 9–13.
- Dix's Peninsula Campaign June 24-July 8.
- Expedition from White House to South Anna River July 1–7.
- Duty at Portsmouth till March l, 1864, and at Norfolk till April 1.
- At Point Lookout, Md., guarding prisoners till July.
- Ordered to Petersburg, Va., July 16.
- Siege of Petersburg July to October.
- Mine Explosion, Petersburg, July 30.
- Weldon Railroad August 18–21.
- Poplar Springs Church September 29-October 2.
- Old members mustered out October 15, 1864. Veterans and Recruits consolidated with 7th Rhode Island Infantry.

== Losses ==
During the war the regiment lost 5 Officers and 68 Enlisted men killed and mortally wounded and 67 Enlisted men by disease; for a total of 140.

== Commanding officers ==
- Colonel Justus I. McCarthy - commission revoked
- Colonel Isaac P. Rodman - promoted Brigadier General
- Colonel William H.P. Steere

== Medal of Honor ==
- Sergeant James H. Burbank – Medal of Honor recipient for action at Blackwater on October 3, 1862

== Notable members ==
- Calixa Lavallée, a Canadian-born private and band musician in the regiment, later composed "O Canada," which became the national anthem of Canada.
- First Lieutenant Henry J. Spooner, a United States representative from Rhode Island.
