= Jonathan Arnold =

American politician (1741–1793)

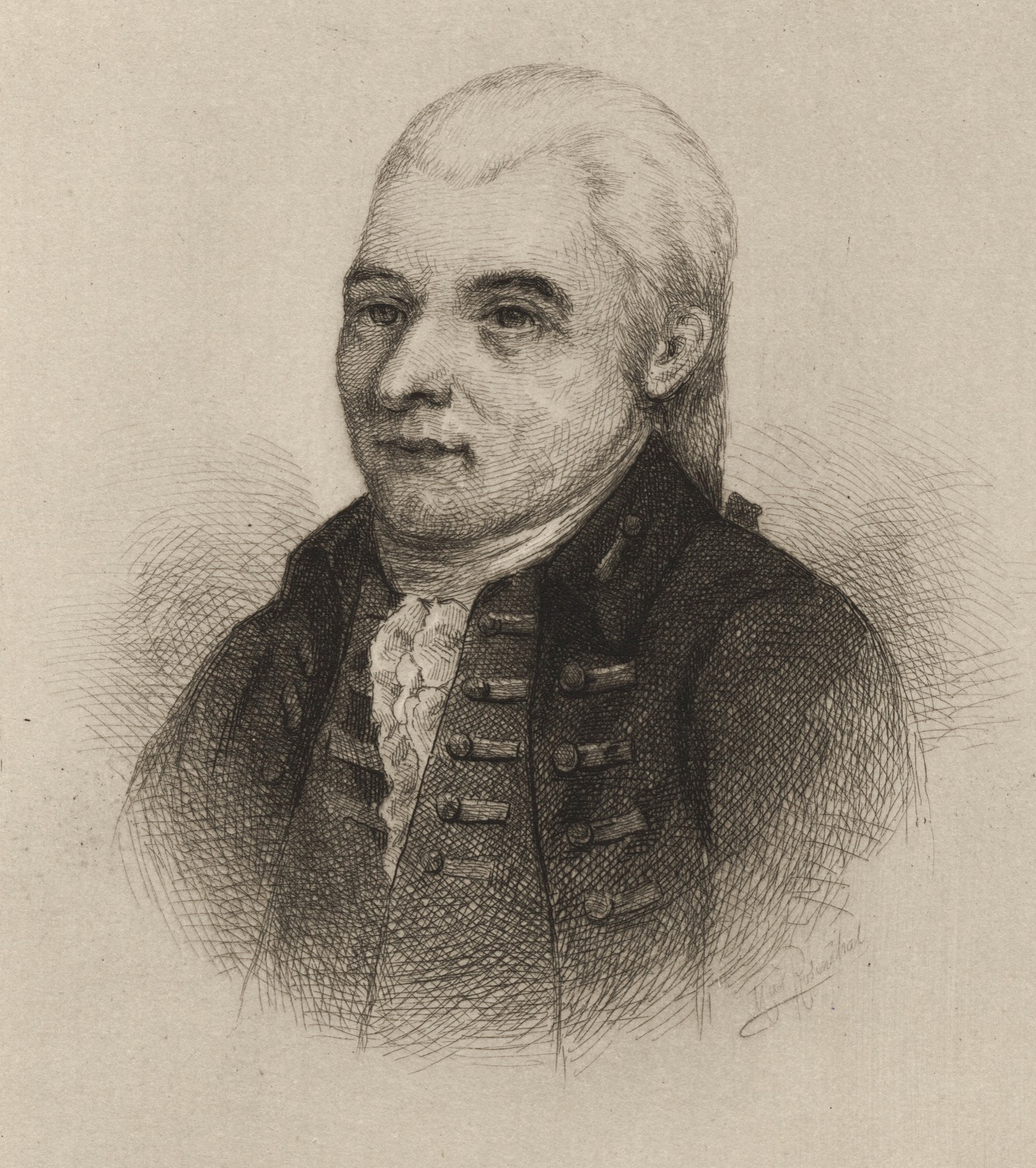
- Etching of Jonathan Arnold by Max Rosenthal

Member of the Vermont Governor's Council
- In office 1790–1793
- Preceded by: Peter Olcott
- Succeeded by: Paul Brigham

Chief Judge of the Orange County, Vermont Court
- In office 1792–1793
- Preceded by: Jacob Bayley
- Succeeded by: Israel Smith

Member of the Congress of the Confederation from Rhode Island
- In office 1782–1784 Serving with John Collins, Ezekiel Cornell, David Howell
- Preceded by: William Ellery, Ezekiel Cornell, Daniel Mowry Jr., James Mitchell Varnum
- Succeeded by: William Ellery, David Howell, Henry Marchant

Personal details
- Born: December 3, 1741 Gloucester, Rhode Island Colony
- Died: February 1, 1793 (aged 52) St. Johnsbury, Vermont
- Resting place: Mount Pleasant Cemetery, St. Johnsbury, Vermont
- Spouse(s): Marry Burr (m. 1763–1781, her death); Alice Crawford (1782–1790, her death); Cynthia Hastings (m. 1792–1793, his death)
- Children: 11 (including Lemuel Hastings Arnold)
- Relatives: Noah Davis (grandson); Richard Arnold (grandson); Theodore Francis Green (great-great-grandson)
- Occupation: Physician; statesman

Military service
- Allegiance: United States (Patriot)
- Branch/service: Continental Army
- Years of service: 1776–1781
- Rank: Surgeon
- Unit: Medical Corps
- Commands: Continental Army Hospital, Providence, Rhode Island

Jonathan Arnold (December 3, 1741 – February 1, 1793) was an American physician and statesman from New England. He was born in Gloucester, Rhode Island, served in the Continental Army as a surgeon, and directed the army hospital in Providence. He represented Rhode Island as a delegate to the Confederation Congress in 1782 and 1783. He moved to a farm in St. Johnsbury, Vermont in 1787, and later served as a judge.

== Early life ==
Jonathan Arnold was born in Gloucester, Rhode Island (Note: Some sources indicate Arnold was born in Providence.) on December 3, 1741 (Old Style December 14), the son of Josiah Arnold and Amy (Phillips) Arnold. He trained for a career in medicine and practiced as a physician in Providence. In 1774, he became a charter member of the Providence Grenadiers militia unit, and until 1776 he commanded a company with the rank of captain. In 1776, Arnold was elected to the Rhode Island General Assembly, where he authored the May Act that repealed the requirement for government officials and militia officers to swear an oath of allegiance to England.

At the start of the American Revolution, Arnold joined the Continental Army as a surgeon. During the war, he was head of the military hospital in Providence. He was elected as a Delegate to the Congress of the Confederation in 1782, and served until 1783. While he was a member of Congress, the body voted in secret to arrest Luke Knowlton and Samuel Wells of Brattleboro in the Vermont Republic on suspicion of communicating with the British in Canada. They fled before they could be detained, but returned to Brattleboro after the end of the Revolution. Arnold was accused of warning Knowlton and Wells prior to their arrests, which he denied, but fellow members of Congress including James Madison did not believe his denial.

== Later life ==
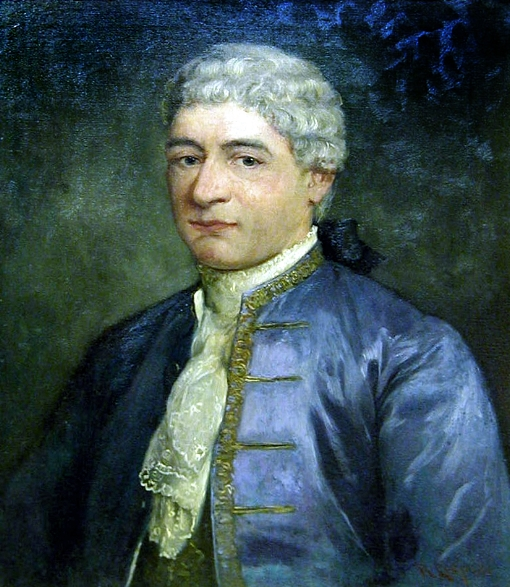
1898 Richard Creifelds portrait based on original miniature

In 1786, Arnold moved to Winchester, New Hampshire, where he continued to practice medicine. He subsequently became proprietor and the first settler of St. Johnsbury, Vermont, and served as St. Johnsbury's first town clerk. While living in Vermont, Arnold also obtained charters for the towns of Bestbury (now Lyndon), Burke, and Billymead (now Sutton). (Note: Several sources indicate that Arnold named Lyndon, Burke, and Billymead for his sons. Lyndon was named for his son Josias Lyndon Arnold, and Billymead for his son William C. Arnold, but Burke was named for Edmund Burke.)

After settling in Vermont, Arnold served on the governor's council from 1790 to 1793. He was a judge of the Orange County court beginning in 1792, and he remained on the bench until his death. While living in Rhode Island, Arnold's family had been given a slave, Ruth Farrow, as a gift. Arnold was a member of the Providence Society for Promoting the Abolition of Slavery, and freed Farrow, who continued to live with and work for members of the Arnold family until her death in 1841.

== Death and burial ==
Arnold died in St. Johnsbury on February 1, 1793. He was initially buried in the Arnold family plot in the town cemetery. When the cemetery's land was appropriated for a courthouse in 1856, Arnold was reburied at Mount Pleasant Cemetery in St. Johnsbury. Arnold Park in St. Johnsbury is located near the site of Arnold's former home, and is named for him.

== Family ==
In 1763, Arnold married Marry Burr (1743–1781). His second wife was Alice Crawford (1757–1790), whom he married in 1782. After the death of his second wife, in 1792 Arnold married Cynthia Hastings Ladd (1763–1838).

Arnold was the father of 11 children:

- Amy Arnold Deuel (1764–1843)
- Amaziah Arnold (1766–1767)
- Josias Lyndon Arnold (1768–1796)
- Polly Burr Arnold (1770–1772)
- William C. Arnold (1773–1813)
- Sarah (Sally) Arnold Burrill (1777–1814)
- Abigail Arnold Dow (1780–1824)
- John Crawford Arnold (1784–1784)
- Freelove Crawford Arnold (1788–1789)
- Freelove Crawford Arnold Davis (1790–1848)
- Lemuel Hastings Arnold (1792–1852)

Arnold's son Lemuel Hastings Arnold served in the United States House of Representatives and as Governor of Rhode Island. His grandson Noah Davis served in the United States House of Representatives. His grandson Richard Arnold was a career officer in the United States Army who served as a brigadier general of volunteers in the Union Army during the American Civil War and attained the rank of major general of both volunteers and the regular army by brevet. His great-great-grandson Theodore Francis Green served as Rhode Island's governor and as a United States Senator.
