= Isaac P. Rodman =

American politician

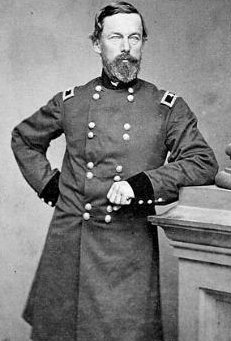
- Rodman, c. 1861-62
- Born: Isaac Peace Rodman; August 18, 1822; South Kingstown, Rhode Island
- Died: September 30, 1862 (aged 40); Sharpsburg, Maryland
- Burial place: Brigadier General Issac P. Rodman Lot, South Kingstown, Rhode Island
- Military career
- Allegiance: United States (Union)
- Branch: United States Army; Union Army
- Service years: 1861–1862
- Rank: Brigadier General
- Unit: 2nd Rhode Island Infantry Regiment
- Commands: 4th Rhode Island Infantry Regiment; 3rd Division, IX Corps
- Conflicts: American Civil War: First Battle of Bull Run; Battle of Roanoke Island; Battle of New Bern; Battle of Fort Macon; Battle of South Mountain; Battle of Antietam (DOW)

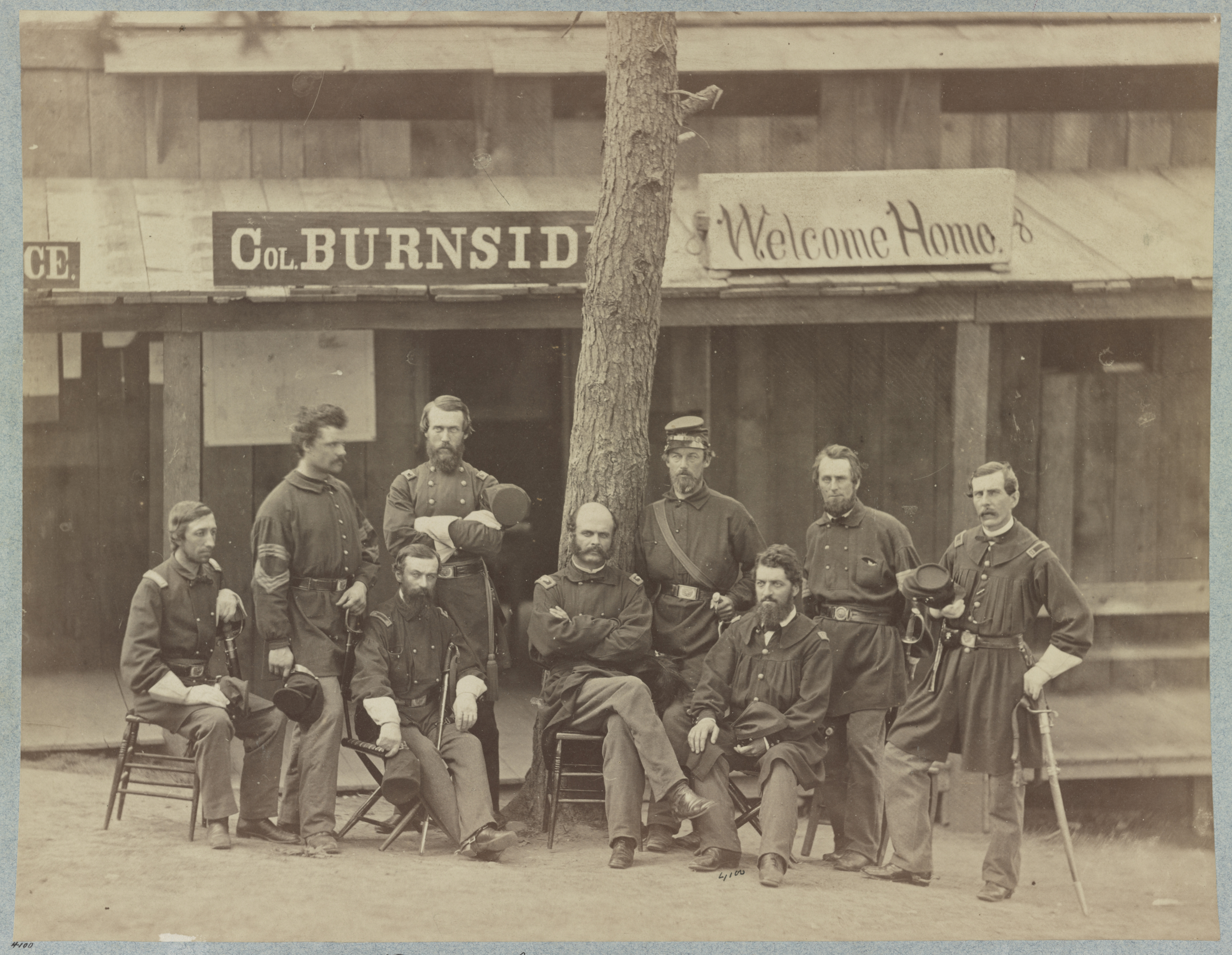
Rodman (leaning against tree) with Col. Ambrose E. Burnside and officers of the 1st Rhode Island

Isaac Peace Rodman (August 18, 1822 – September 30, 1862) was a Rhode Island banker, politician, and a Union Army brigadier general in the American Civil War, who was mortally wounded at the Battle of Antietam.

== Early life and career ==
Isaac Peace Rodman was born in South Kingstown, Rhode Island the son of Samuel Rodman and Mary Peckham. He was married to Sally Lyman Arnold, daughter of Rhode Island Governor Lemuel Hastings Arnold. His brother-in-law was future Civil War general Richard Arnold.

He entered into a partnership with his brother Rowland Gibson Rodman and his father Samuel Rodman, under the name S. Rodman & Sons. Isaac Rodman was for many years president of the town council of South Kingstown, a representative for several terms in the Rhode Island General Assembly, in the Rhode Island Senate. He was also a director in the Wakefield Bank and the Institution for Savings. As well as being a politician, businessman, and banker, Isaac Rodman was a devoted Christian, a teacher of a Bible study class, and a superintendent of a Sunday school.

== Civil War ==
At the start of the Civil War, Rodman was torn between the precepts of his religion and his loyalty to the Union, but unhesitatingly raised a group of local residents for the 2nd Rhode Island Infantry Regiment and was given the rank of captain. The regiment fought in the First Battle of Bull Run in the brigade of Brigadier General Ambrose Burnside and suffered heavy losses, including the regiment's colonel. Rodman was appointed as colonel of the new 4th Rhode Island Infantry Regiment by Rhode Island Governor William Sprague on October 3, 1861. He fought under Burnside in North Carolina in the Battle of Roanoke Island, and then at the Battle of New Bern, where he distinguished himself for his gallantry and was made a brigadier general on April 28, 1862. After the Battle of Fort Macon, he contracted typhoid fever and returned to South Kingstown.

General Burnside wrote to Rodman, convalescing at home, to inform him of a need for officers for an upcoming battle in the Maryland Campaign, opposing Confederate General Robert E. Lee's first invasion of the North. Still ailing and against the advice of his physician, he returned to the Army after only a few weeks. In the Battle of South Mountain he led the 3rd Division of the IX Corps to take Turner's Gap. During that assault, IX Corps commander Maj. Gen. Jesse L. Reno was killed and he was replaced by Jacob D. Cox. Three days later, in the Battle of Antietam, on September 17, 1862, Burnside's corps was ordered to strike the right flank of the Confederate army, on the heights to the south of Sharpsburg. The corps was held up attempting to cross the single, heavily defended, bridge across Antietam Creek in that sector (now known as Burnside Bridge) and Burnside sent Rodman's 3rd Division downstream to find a fording spot and flank the enemy defending the bridge. No one in the army had reconnoitered the proposed ford, two-thirds of a mile south of the bridge, and they found out too late that it was unusable due to its steep banks. Rodman's men spent three hours before finally finding and crossing Snavely's Ford two miles farther downstream at 1 p.m., by which time Burnside Bridge had finally been taken. The corps made good progress from that point in driving west towards Sharpsburg, but at 4:00 p.m. A. P. Hill's Light Division joined the battle, launching a spirited counterattack after a rapid forced march from Harpers Ferry. Sighting the approaching Confederates, Rodman knew his division, on the Union army's left flank, would take the brunt of their assault. Galloping across a cornfield to warn his brigade commanders, he was shot through the left lung, mortally wounded. He died thirteen days later in a field hospital at Sharpsburg.

In a funeral oration, Senator Henry B. Anthony said of Rodman:

Here lies the true type of the patriot soldier. Born and educated to peaceful pursuits, with no thirst for military distinction, with little taste or predilection for military life, he answered the earliest call of his country, and drew his sword in her defense. Entering the service in a subordinate capacity, he rose by merit alone to the high rank in which he fell; and when the fatal shot struck him, the captain of one year ago was in command of a division. His rapid promotion was influenced by no solicitations of his own. He never joined the crowd that throng the avenues of preferment. Patient, laborious, courageous, wholly devoted to his duties, he filled each place so well that his advancement to the next was a matter of course, and the promotion which he did not seek sought him. He was one of the best type of the American citizen; of thorough business training, of high integrity, with an abiding sense of the justice due to all, and influenced by deep religious convictions. In his native village he was by common consent the arbitrator of differences, the counselor and friend of all.

Isaac Rodman is buried in the Rodman family cemetery, Peace Dale, Rhode Island. Rodman's house was listed on the National Register of Historic Places listings in Washington County, Rhode Island on April 23, 1990.

== Dates of rank ==
- Captain, 2nd Rhode Island Infantry - 6 June 1861
- Resigned - 25 October 1861
- Colonel, 4th Rhode Island Infantry - 30 October 1861
- Brigadier General, Volunteers - 28 April 1862
- Died of wounds - 30 September 1862

== See also ==
- List of American Civil War generals (Union)
