= New Bern Battlefield Site =

- U.S. National Register of Historic Places
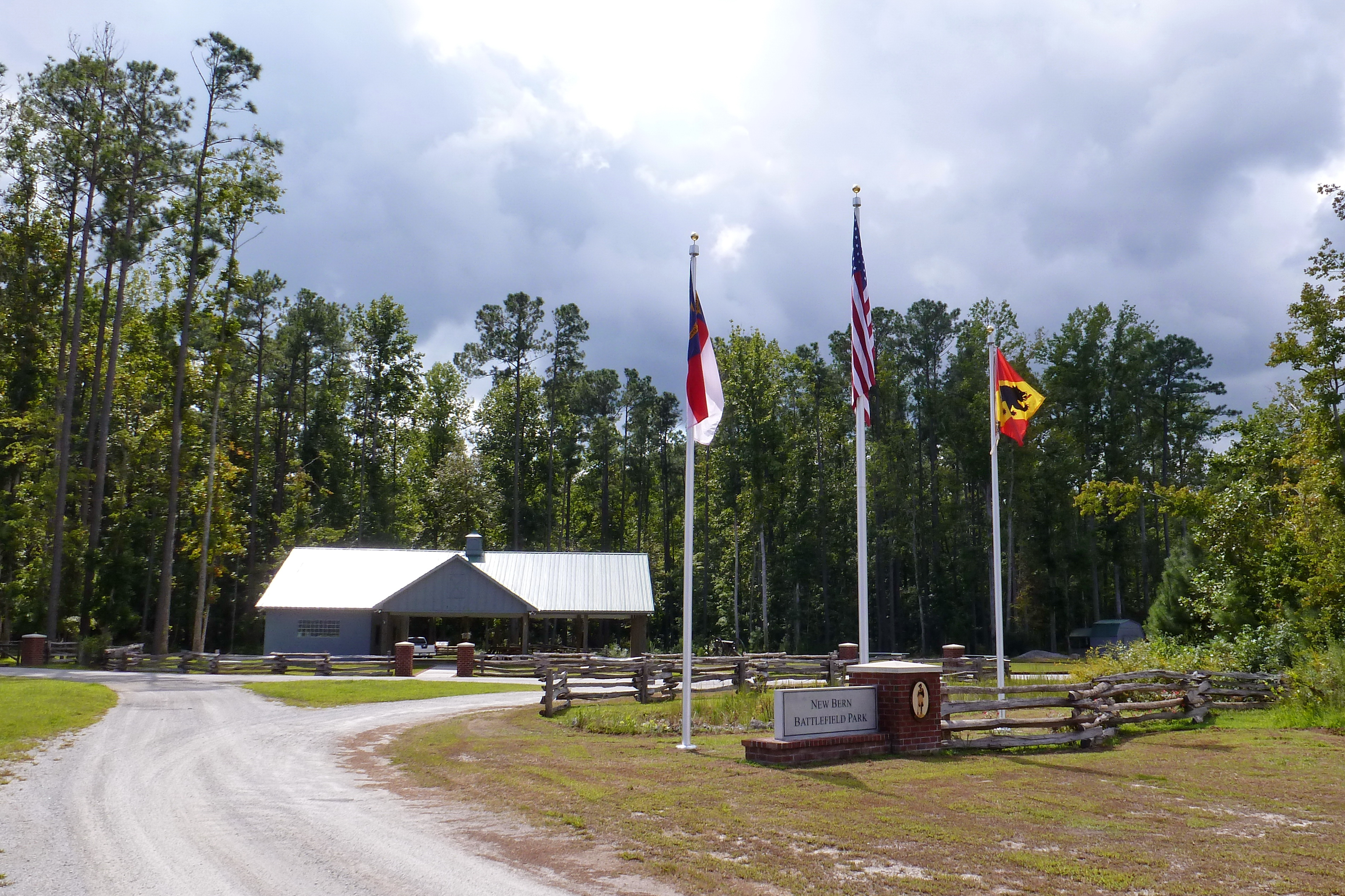
- New Bern Battlefield Site, September 2012

- Location within North Carolina Location within the United States
- Location: US 70 E., approx. 4.5 miles SE of New Bern, near New Bern, North Carolina
- Coordinates: 35°2′39″N 77°0′56″W
- Area: 99 acres (40 ha)
- Built: 1862
- NRHP reference No.: 01001129
- Added to NRHP: October 19, 2001

New Bern Battlefield Site is a historic site of the American Civil War Battle of New Bern located near New Bern, Craven County, North Carolina. The battle was fought on 14 March 1862. The New Bern Battlefield Site consists of two discontiguous sites.

The Site was listed on the National Register of Historic Places in 2001.

The New Bern Historical Society owns about 27 acres of the battlefield site and protects it as New Bern Battlefield Park, which includes a visitor center and monument. The Society offers guided tours of the park by appointment. Self-guided brochures are available from the Society's website. The American Battlefield Trust and its partners have acquired and preserved 25 acres (0.10 km^{2}) of the battlefield as of mid-2023.
