= James H. Burbank =

- Reinder Jilderts
- Born: January 5, 1838; Stavoren, Netherlands
- Died: March 15, 1911 (aged 73); Kansas
- Burial place: Miltonvale Cemetery, Miltonvale, Kansas
- Military career
- Allegiance: United States of America
- Branch: United States Army
- Service years: 1861 - 1864
- Rank: Sergeant
- Unit: 4th Regiment Rhode Island Volunteer Infantry
- Awards: Medal of Honor

Sergeant James H. Burbank (January 5, 1838 – February 15, 1911) was a Dutch soldier who fought in the American Civil War. Burbank received the United States' highest award for bravery during combat, the Medal of Honor, for his action at Blackwater near Franklin, Virginia, on 3 October 1862. He was honored with the award on 27 July 1896.

== Biography ==
Burbank was born as Reinder Jilderts in Stavoren, Netherlands, on 5 January 1838, and emigrated to the United States. He enlisted in the 1st Rhode Island Volunteers on 16 April 1861 at Providence, Rhode Island. He was promoted to second sergeant and later served as a non-commissioned first sergeant. Burbank served an 11-month stint with the Navy on detached service. It was during this service that he performed the act of gallantry that earned him the Medal of Honor. In October 1862, he was aboard the USS Commodore Perry at Blackwater River, near Franklin, Virginia. He served with outstanding bravery despite heavy fire and thirteen shots piercing his coat.

Following the war, Burbank married Mary A. Burns, who had emigrated from Glasgow, Scotland, and they resided in Rhode Island. He subsequently moved to Missouri and then to Kansas. Together, they had seven children.

== Medal of Honor citation ==
Gallantry in action while on detached service on board the gunboat Barney.

== See also ==
- List of American Civil War Medal of Honor recipients: A–F
