= Battle of New Bern =

Battle of the American Civil War

Coordinates: 35.0428°N 77.0148°W

- Part of the American Civil War
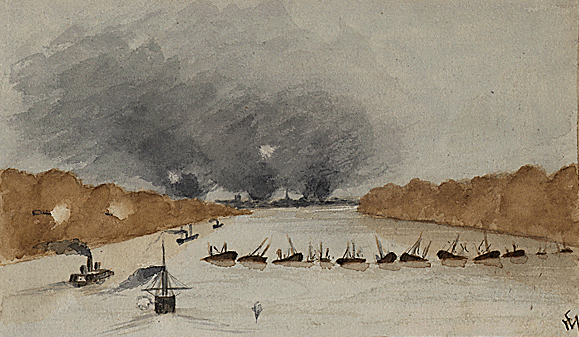
- The advance of the Gunboats up the river to New Berne, N. Carolina. Passing the Barricade by Herbert Eugene Valentine
Date	March 14, 1862
Location	Craven County, North Carolina
Result	Union victory

Belligerents
United States (Union)	Confederate States

Commanders and leaders
(United States) Ambrose Burnside (United States Navy) Stephen C. Rowan	(Confederate States of America) Lawrence O'B. Branch

Units involved
Coast Division; North Atlantic Blockading Squadron	1st Division, Department of North Carolina

Strength
13 infantry regiments (11,000); 14 gunboats	6 infantry regiments (4,000); 1 cavalry regiment

Casualties and losses
90 killed 380 wounded 1 missing	64 killed 101 wounded 413 men and nine cannons captured or missing

The Battle of New Bern (also known as the Battle of New Berne) was fought on March 14, 1862, near the city of New Bern, North Carolina, as part of the Burnside Expedition of the American Civil War. The US Army's Coast Division, led by Brigadier General Ambrose Burnside and accompanied by armed vessels from the North Atlantic Blockading Squadron, were opposed by an undermanned and badly trained Confederate force of North Carolina soldiers and militia led by Brigadier General Lawrence O'B. Branch. Although the defenders fought behind breastworks that had been set up before the battle, their line had a weak spot in its center that was exploited by the attacking Federal soldiers. When the center of the line was penetrated, many of the militia broke, forcing a general retreat of the entire Confederate force. General Branch was unable to regain control of his troops until they had retreated to Kinston, more than 30 miles (about 50 km) away. New Bern came under Federal control, and remained so for the rest of the war.

== Background ==
New Bern lies on the left (southwest) bank of the Neuse River, about 37 miles (60 km) above its exit into Pamlico Sound. The river is broad in this vicinity, and is deep enough that vessels that can navigate the sound can also ply the river. In the colonial era, the town was quite important as a seaport, but by the time of the Civil War Morehead City and Beaufort had largely supplanted it. Nevertheless, New Bern was still a significant military target, as the railroad (Atlantic and North Carolina Railroad) that connected the coast with the interior passed through the city. A short distance further up, at Goldsboro (spelled Goldsborough in the 19th century), the line crossed the Wilmington and Weldon Railroad, noted for keeping the Confederate Army of Northern Virginia supplied throughout the war. Thus, if New Bern were to fall into Federal hands, an important link in the supply chain of that army would be broken.

The land in this part of North Carolina is low and rather flat, and is sometimes marshy. In 1862, the solid land was mostly covered with open pine forest, although in places it was broken into low hills with deciduous forests, separated by ravines. It is crossed by many creeks that sometimes rise to the status of small rivers. One of these, the Trent River, separates New Bern from the land to its south. The slightly smaller Slocum's Creek, enters 16 miles (26 km) farther down the Neuse. It was to be the landing site for the attacking Federal forces.

The entire action, aside from the takeover of the city, was confined to the land between these two streams. The railroad ran on a system of berms and occasional cuts about a mile (1.6 km) inland from the river. It entered the city on a bridge over the Trent River. A county road passed over the same land, also connecting New Bern with Morehead City and Beaufort. In the vicinity of the battle, it lay between railroad and the river, but it crossed the railroad about a mile and a half (2 km) north of what would be the battlefield. The road continued to the northwest, crossing the Trent on a drawbridge some 4 miles (6.4 km) west of the city.

== Prelude ==
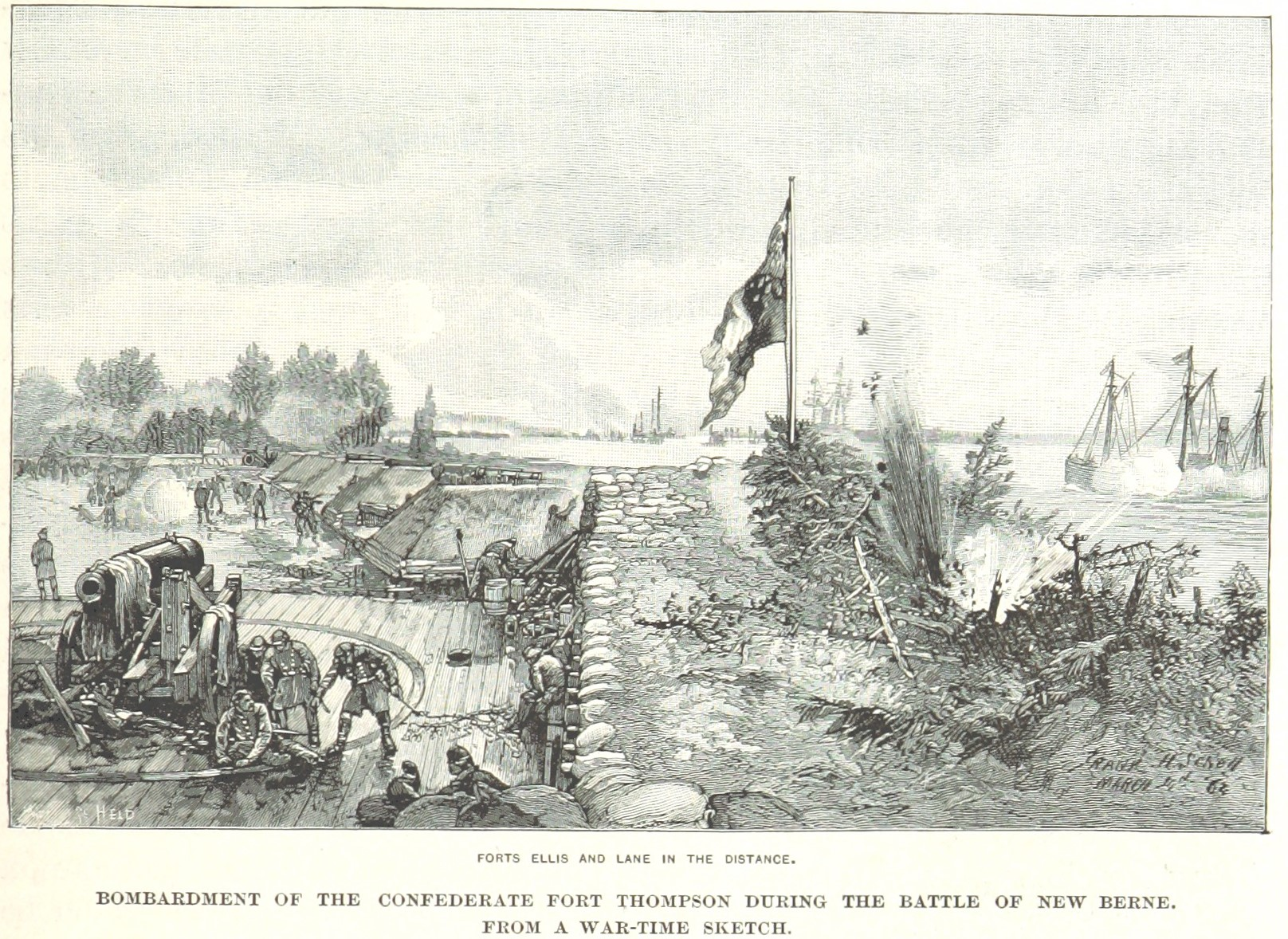
Bombardment of Fort Thompson, a war-time sketch by Francis H. Schell.

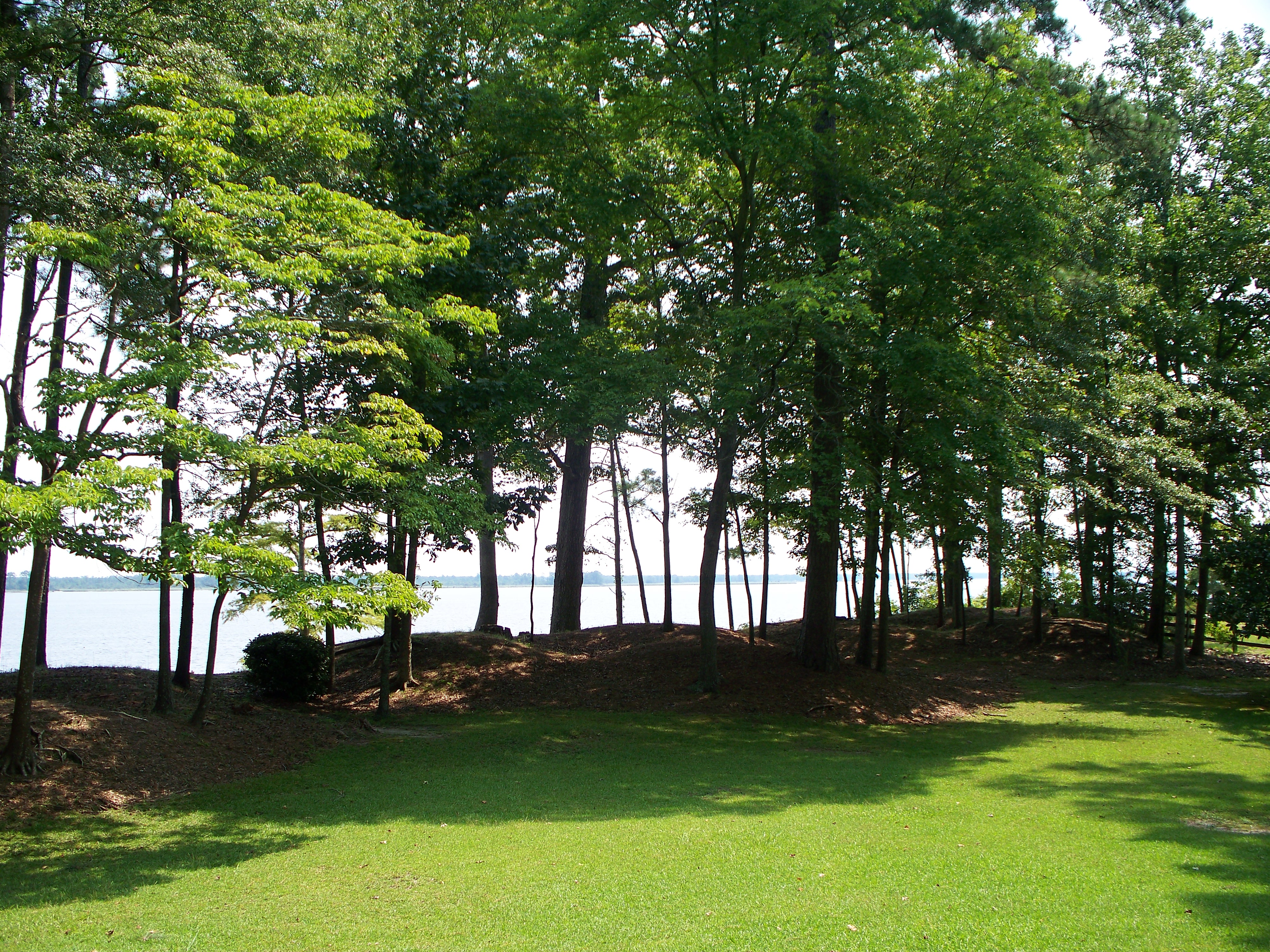
The present-day location of Fort Thompson. Only the earthenworks remain. The Neuse River can be seen in the background.

Following the secession of North Carolina from the Union, the defenses of the state were neglected by the Confederate government in Richmond. The War Department, directed at first by Secretary Leroy P. Walker and later by Judah P. Benjamin, used the state's best-trained and best-equipped troops to take part in the campaigns in Virginia, which were given a higher priority. They were seen as protecting the Confederate capital of Richmond. When Hatteras Island fell to Union forces in August 1861, only six regiments of infantry were available to defend the entire coast of the state.

By that time, the Confederacy had divided the coastal defense into separate districts for command purposes; the northern part, from near Cape Lookout to the Virginia border, was assigned to Brig. Gen. Daniel H. Hill, who set up the defensive lines around New Bern. South of the city, across the Trent River, he had built two primary lines. First was a system of breastworks named the "Croatan Works," near Otter Creek and extending inland as far as the railroad. Six miles (10 km) closer to the city was another substantial line anchored on the river by Fort Thompson. The fort held 13 guns, three of which bore on landward approaches. Hill ordered construction of a series of batteries along the river to defend against attack by naval forces. The Confederates blocked the river with two barriers. The first, a mile and a half (2.4 km) below Fort Thompson, consisted of a double row of piles cut off below the water, capped with iron, and backed by a row of 30 torpedoes (present-day mines). Each torpedo contained about 200 pounds (100 kg) of powder. The second was opposite Fort Thompson and consisted of a row of hulks and chevaux de frise, which would force ships to pass under the guns of the fort.

Hill hoped that he would be given sufficient manpower to fill his lines, but he was transferred to service in Virginia before the hoped-for additional troops arrived. Shortly after he was succeeded by Brig. Gen. Lawrence O'B. Branch, the district was divided again. Branch's command extended from Cape Lookout north only to the limits of Pamlico Sound. From there to the Virginia border and beyond was assigned to Brig. Gen. Benjamin Huger, whose primary concern was the defense of Norfolk and environs. This meant in particular that Roanoke Island, between Croatan Sound and Roanoke Sound just north of Pamlico Sound, was not included in Branch's command.

Roanoke Island fell to a combined operation of the Union Army's Coast Division, under Brig. Gen. Ambrose E. Burnside, and a Union gunboat flotilla assembled from the North Atlantic Blockading Squadron, under Flag Officer Louis M Goldsborough, on February 7–8, 1862. That battle was rapidly followed up by the gunboats alone, who wiped out the Confederate Navy's Mosquito Fleet in an assault on Elizabeth City. Shortly afterward, Goldsborough had to leave the sounds for duties at Hampton Roads, and immediate command of the ships he left behind fell to Commander Stephen C. Rowan. As a result of the battles, Union forces could move at will in Albemarle and Pamlico Sounds. Every city and town accessible to those sounds hence became vulnerable to attack. The most important was New Bern, and Burnside soon resolved to take it.

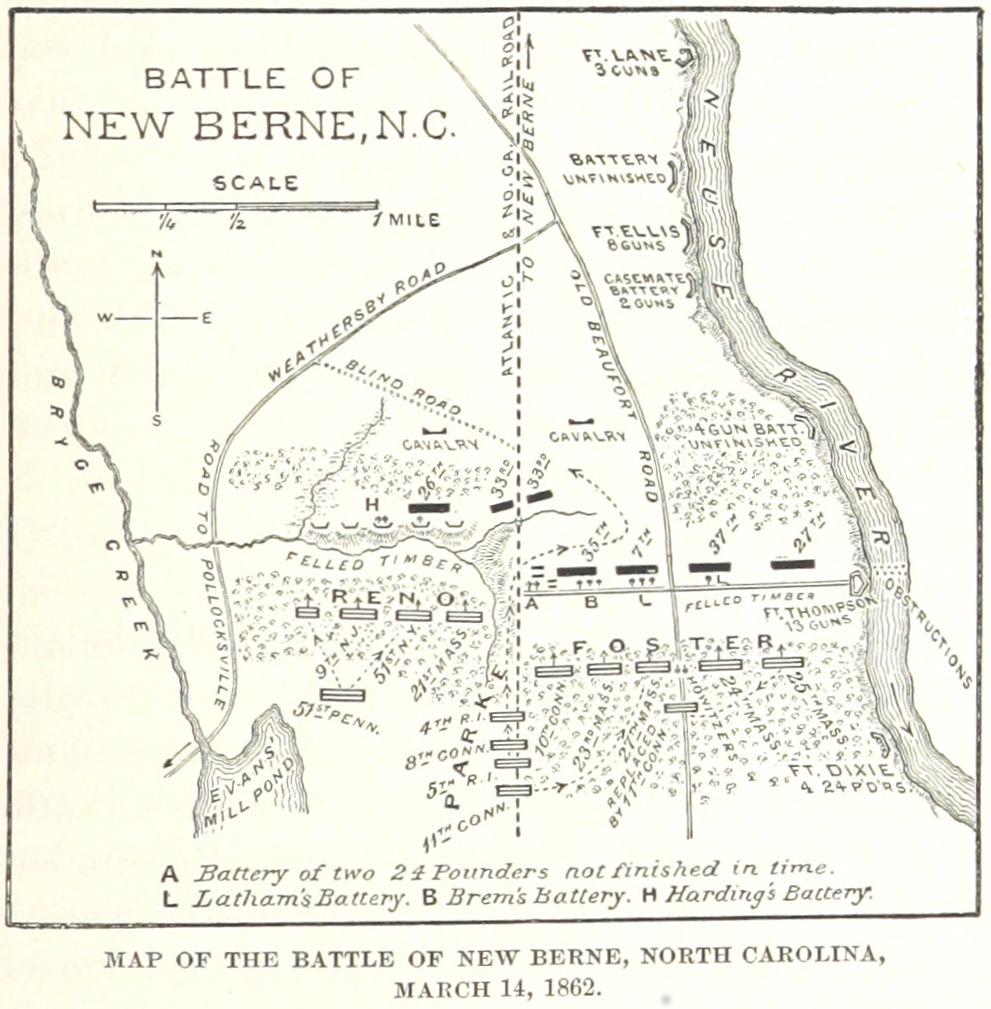
A map of the battlefield, based on one prepared for General Branch

The importance of New Bern was no more obvious to Burnside than it was to the Confederate authorities in Richmond, but they did little to secure it. Although more than a month passed after Roanoke Island fell before Burnside could mount an attack on the city, the local command received no reinforcements. One of General Branch's aides estimated that the lines would need at least 6,130 men to hold them, but he had only about 4,000 at his disposal, a number often reduced by sickness. Furthermore, many of the men were poorly armed militiamen. The disparity between necessity and reality persuaded Branch to draw his lines in, abandoning some of the strong breastworks erected by his predecessor. The principal defense would be the line based on Fort Thompson.

The Fort Thompson line that had been set up by General Hill extended only from the river to the railroad. They ended on the right in a brickyard that would figure prominently in the fighting. Because the land farther to the right was fairly firm and would allow his position to be flanked, General Branch decided to extend the line beyond the railroad and end it in a swamp. This just about doubled the length of the defensive line. He made a major blunder in laying out the line, however. In haste to complete the extension and faced with an exasperating shortage of labor, he decided to use a small creek as a natural part of the line. This creek intersected the railroad at a point some 150 yards (135 meters) up from the brickyard. The line of breastworks therefore had a dogleg in its center.

== Opposing forces ==
=== Confederate ===
The confederate defenses included 4000 men behind temporary defenses. The confederate defenders were common infantry, cavalry, and artillery from North Carolina. They were led by Brig. Gen. Lawrence Branch. The Confederate defenders armed themselves with ten cannons from two artillery batteries. Additional confederate defenses included river obstructions in the Neuse river. Forts including Lane, Ellis, Allen, Thompson, and Dixie served as defenses to protect the area. Two entrenchments were also dug as defenses along the land routes of the West Bank. The Confederates suffered 68 deaths, 116 wounded, and 425 captured or missing. Out of all the cannons, only two were saved. All the confederate soldiers lost their equipment during the battle.

== Battle ==
=== Advance ===
The soldiers of the Coast Division clambered into their transports at Roanoke Island on March 11, 1862, and got under way early the next morning, accompanied by 14 Navy gunboats and one gunboat of their own. One of the Navy vessels was detached to guard the mouth of the Pamlico River, where it was incorrectly rumored that the Rebels were preparing two ships to cut off transports that might become separated from Navy protection. The main force traversed Pamlico Sound, entered the Neuse River, and anchored near the mouth of Slocum's Creek at dusk. The fleet that traveled up the Neuse River was full of infantry who left their ships and setup south of confederate soldiers at Fort Thompson. These confederate soldiers consisted of 4000 men who were behind temporary defenses. Branch was aware of their presence, and immediately ordered his forces to take up defensive positions. He sent Col. James Sinclair's 35th North Carolina Infantry to the landing at Otter Creek, in front of the Croatan work, with instructions to oppose enemy landings at that site. Colonel Zebulon Vance's 26th North Carolina was ordered into the Croatan work. Other units guarded the river upstream, and reserves were assembled at the intersection of the railroad and the Beaufort road. All units were instructed that if they were forced from their positions, they should fall back on the Fort Thompson line.

At dawn on March 13, the Federal troops began to disembark. A small Rebel unit trying to contest the landing was quickly driven away by fire from the gunboats, as Col. Sinclair interpreted his orders to defend against a landing at Otter Creek narrowly. Burnside spent the morning getting men and equipment ashore. With the infantry came six boat (Navy) howitzers and two Army howitzers. Because of the weather, he decided to land his other artillery closer to the enemy lines, but dense fog soon closed in, and he could not communicate with the fleet. His remaining guns were not landed.

A little after noon the Union soldiers began to move toward the Confederate lines, and at about the same time the rains began. The road was soon turned into mud, and the mere act of walking required great exertion. The gunners with the howitzers accompanying the infantry soon were exhausted trying to move their pieces, so a regiment of infantry (51st Pennsylvania) were detailed to help them. Many of those foot soldiers long remembered this as the most arduous part of the battle.

As the soldiers made their slow progress, the gunboats kept a short distance ahead, shelling places where Rebels might be waiting. Col. R. P. Campbell, in command of the Confederate right wing, interpreted the naval gunfire as preliminary to another landing that would take the Croatan work in reverse, so he ordered a general pullback to the Fort Thompson line. Thus, when the Federal army came upon the first Confederate breastworks, they found them abandoned.

The Coast Division soon resumed its march. Leaving the Croatan work, First (Foster's) Brigade moved on the right, following the county road, while Second (Reno's) Brigade followed the railroad on the left. Third (Parke's) Brigade followed after the First. They continued until they came in contact with enemy pickets, about a mile and a half (2 km) away from the Fort Thompson line held by the Rebels. Daylight having been exhausted, Burnside ordered a halt and had the brigades bivouac in the order of their march: First Brigade on the right near the road, Second Brigade on the left near the railroad, and Third Brigade to the rear of the First. The howitzers did not arrive until 0300 the next morning.

=== The fight ===
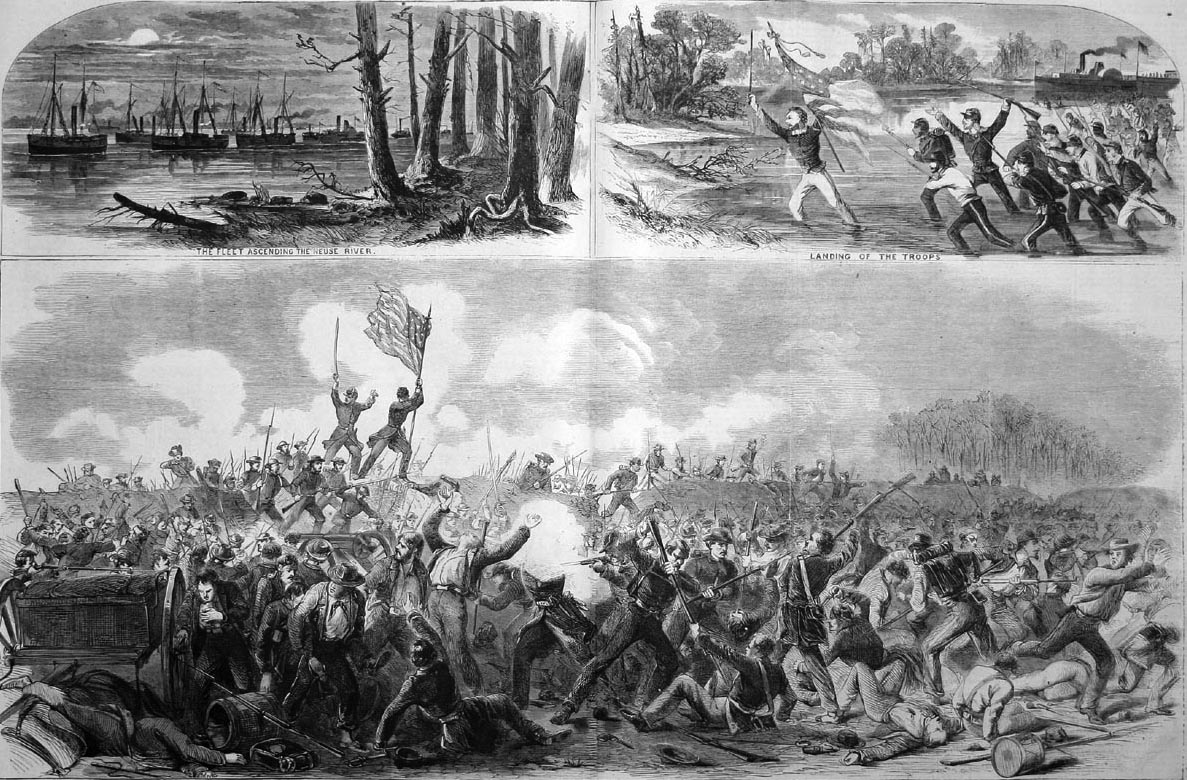
Battle of New Bern as illustrated in Harper's Weekly. 5 April 1862

The field was covered by a dense fog on the morning of March 14. Burnside ordered his forces to form and advance on the Rebel works. The Yankees did not have complete information concerning their opponents' disposition at this time; so far as they knew, the Confederate line extended only from the river to the brickyard. In keeping with this belief, Burnside ordered the First Brigade to engage the enemy left, while the Second Brigade would try to turn their right, at the brickyard. The eight howitzers were deployed across the county road. Third Brigade was held as a reserve. The Army also got some dubious support from the gunboats under Commander Stephen C. Rowan, who shelled the Rebel positions although they were hidden by intervening forests. This gunfire greatly disturbed the North Carolinians, but it was inaccurate enough that Burnside eventually asked Rowan to change direction.

Meanwhile, on the other side, General Branch had put his regiments into the line. From his left, at Fort Thompson, to the brickyard on his right, were the 27th, 37th, 7th, and 35th North Carolina regiments. His reserve was the 33rd Regiment. The right flank of the 35th was anchored in a brickyard kiln that was loopholed for artillery. The entire line beyond the railroad was occupied by a single regiment, the 26th North Carolina, plus a few companies of cavalry. The gap in his line created by the dogleg at the railroad was covered only by his weakest unit, a militia battalion with only two weeks of training, and armed with shotguns and hunting rifles. To give them additional support, he ordered up a two-gun battery of 24-pounders to the kiln, but they were not mounted when they came under attack. The First Brigade of the Union Army opposed them from the river to the railroad; right to left, the units were the 25th, 24th, 27th, and 23rd Massachusetts, and the 10th Connecticut. The Beaufort Road ran through the center of this line, and here General Foster placed the howitzers that had been dragged along.

On the Federal left, General Reno, still unaware of the extension of the enemy lines beyond the railroad, ordered a part of the 21st Massachusetts to charge the brick kiln, while the 9th New Jersey and the 51st New York would engage the enemy in support. The 51st Pennsylvania was held in reserve. The charge was successful at first, but they then found themselves under fire from the whole line and were forced to pull back.

Burnside at this time ordered his reserve, the Third Brigade, into the line to support Reno's Second Brigade. The 4th Rhode Island replaced the 21st Massachusetts, which had used up its ammunition. While trading places, Colonel Isaac P. Rodman of the 4th Rhode Island was told by Lieutenant Colonel William S. Clark of the 21st Massachusetts that he thought that another attack on the brick kiln would be successful. Rodman sent a courier to General Parke informing him that he was taking responsibility, then formed his regiment and ordered them to charge. Armed with better knowledge of the enemy, this charge was successful. The 4th Rhode Island captured nine brass field pieces, and found themselves in the rear of the Rebel entrenchments.

At this point, the Confederate line broke. The rupture started when the inexperienced militiamen fled and exposed the units on both of their flanks. Branch ordered his reserves to plug the gap, but they did not arrive in time. As the line was rolled up on both wings, each regimental commander in succession pulled his unit back to escape being slaughtered. General Branch ordered a retreat, which soon became a rout. The fleeing North Carolinians dashed across the bridge over the Trent River into New Bern, then burned the bridge so precipitately that some of their compatriots were left behind and were captured. They also burned a fire raft in the river, which soon drifted against the railroad bridge and destroyed it.

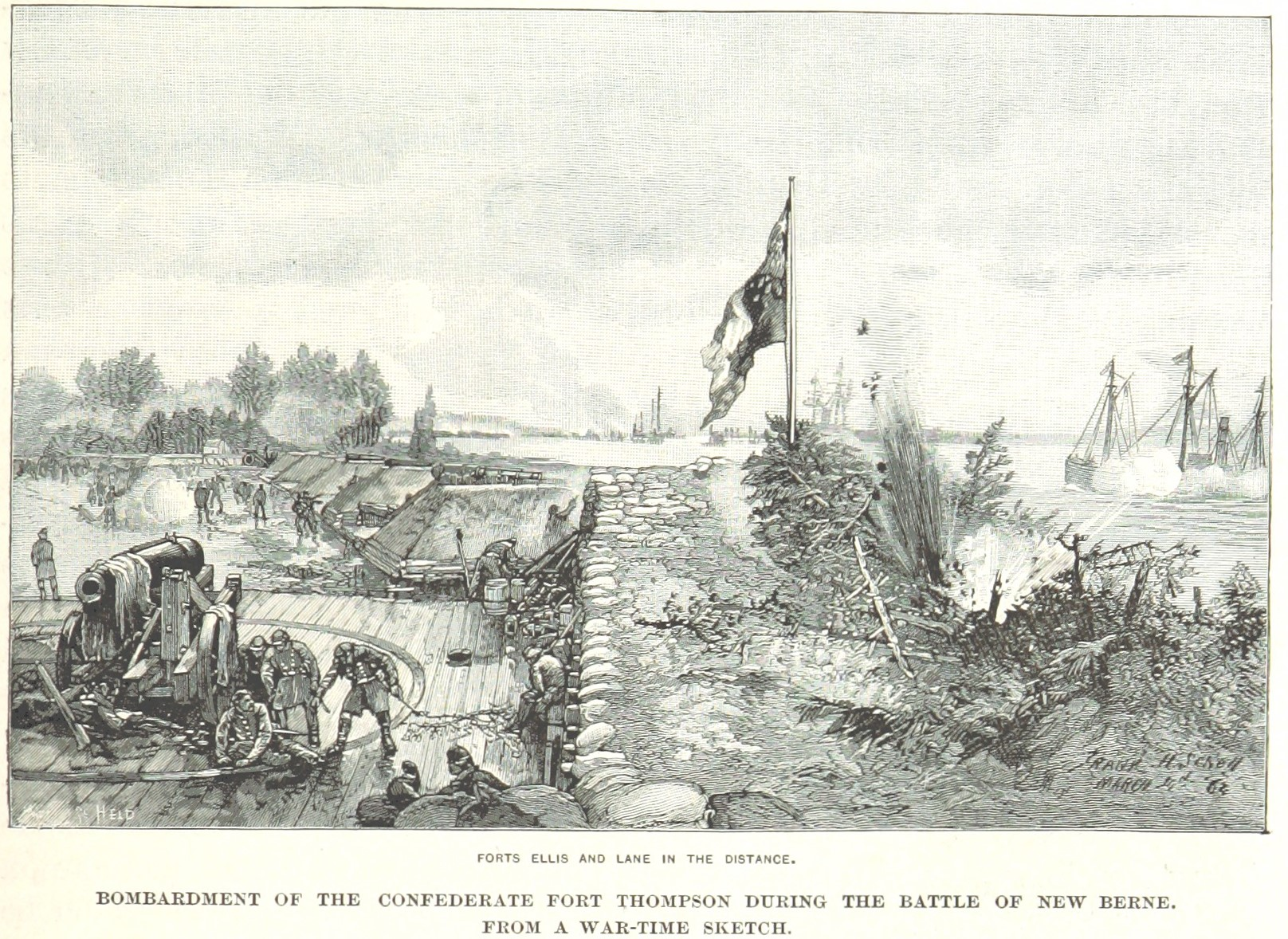
The Union ships bombard Fort Thompson

While the battle was in progress, Commander Rowan's ships had moved up the river to assist. They received only minor damage in passing the lower barrier, and then positioned themselves to shell Fort Thompson. When the fort was abandoned, they immediately passed the second barrier and moved on to New Bern. Because Branch's order to retreat included all of the Confederate river batteries, their guns were spiked and they were abandoned to the fleet. At the city, the fleet shelled the retreating Confederate troops, denying them the opportunity to regroup. The retreating units could not reform until they had fled all the way to Kinston. With both bridges destroyed, Burnside's soldiers had to be ferried across the river by the gunboats.

Branch had lost 64 killed, 101 wounded, and 413 captured or missing, compared to Burnside's 90 killed, 380 wounded, and a single man captured.

== Aftermath ==
New Bern fell and was occupied. It remained in control of the Union Army for the rest of the war. Immediately following the battle, Burnside turned his attention to his next important objective, getting control of the port at Beaufort, which was defended by Fort Macon. The Rebels did not defend Morehead City, which was occupied immediately by the Yankees, or Beaufort, which was taken on 25 March. The siege of Fort Macon began at that time. As the Union captured New Bern, it meant a turning point for union control of the coast of North Carolina. The New Bern region was an important victory for the union as it created more space for camps, housing, and employment for refugees. Confederate forces launched three attempts to recapture the town without success.

== Battlefield preservation ==
The battlefield is preserved today as the New Bern Battlefield Site. The American Battlefield Trust and its partners, including the New Bern Historical Society, have acquired and preserved 25 acres (0.10 km^{2}) of the battlefield site as of mid-2023.

== See also ==
- Burnside's North Carolina Expedition
- Battle of New Bern (1864), Confederate attempt to retake New Bern in February 1864.
- New Bern Battlefield Site, listed on the National Register of Historic Places

== Notes ==
Abbreviations used in these notes:

ORA (Official records, armies): War of the Rebellion: A Compilation of the Official Records of the Union and Confederate Armies.
ORN (Official records, navies): Official Records of the Union and Confederate Navies in the War of the Rebellion.
