= Gen. Isaac Peace Rodman House =

Historic house in Rhode Island, United States

- U.S. National Register of Historic Places
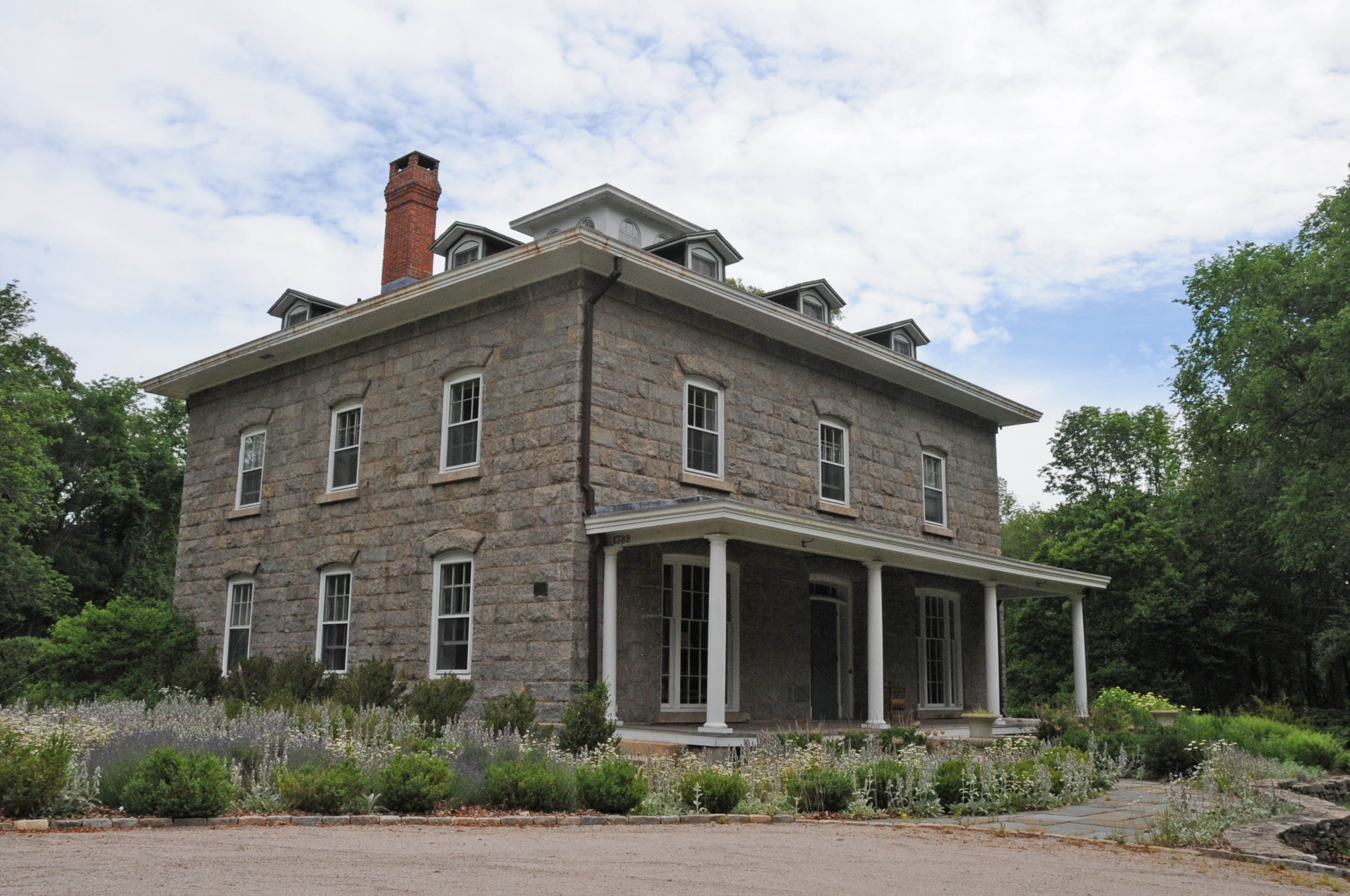

- Location within Rhode Island Location within the United States
- Location: 1789 Kingstown Road, South Kingstown, Rhode Island
- Coordinates: 41°27′58″N 71°30′35″W
- Area: 5.5 acres (2.2 ha)
- Built: 1855
- Architectural style: Mid 19th Century Revival, Italianate
- NRHP reference No.: 90000596
- Added to NRHP: April 23, 1990

The Gen. Isaac Peace Rodman House is an historic house in South Kingstown, Rhode Island. It is a 2 1/2-story granite structure built in 1855 by Isaac P. Rodman, a prominent politician and businessman who served as a general in the Union Army during the American Civil War. In addition to its association with Rodman, the house is notable as an excellent early Italianate design based on the published works of Andrew Jackson Downing, and its attractively landscaped grounds.

The house was listed on the National Register of Historic Places in 1990.

== See also ==
- National Register of Historic Places listings in Washington County, Rhode Island
