= Lemuel H. Arnold =

American politician

Lemuel Hastings Arnold
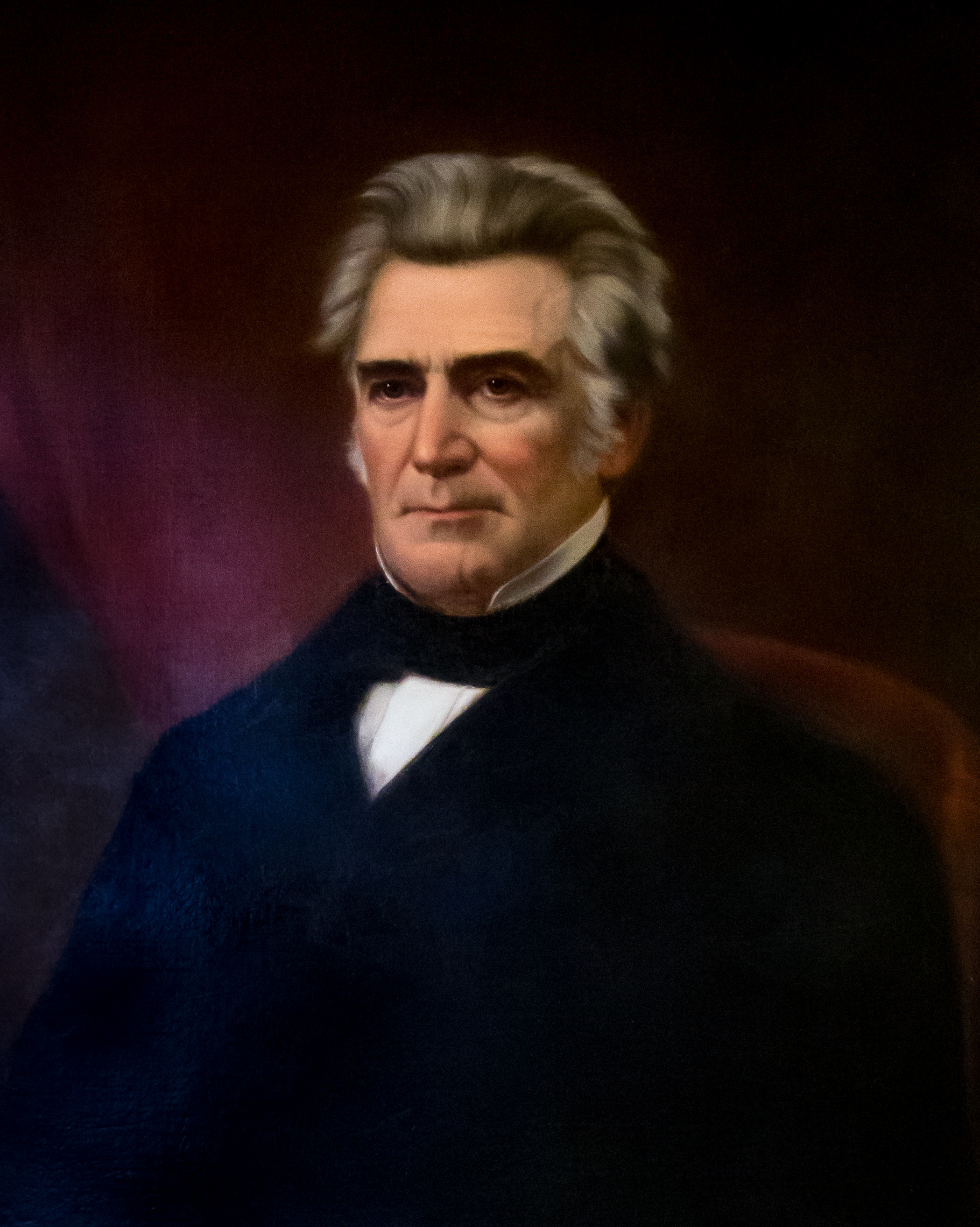
- Official Rhode Island State House portrait by James Sullivan Lincoln

12th Governor of Rhode Island
- In office May 4, 1831 – May 1, 1833
- Lieutenant: Charles Collins
- Preceded by: James Fenner
- Succeeded by: John Brown Francis

Member of the U.S. House of Representatives from Rhode Island's 2nd district
- In office March 4, 1845 – March 3, 1847
- Preceded by: Elisha R. Potter
- Succeeded by: Benjamin Babock Thurston

Member of the Rhode Island House of Representatives
- In office 1826–1831

Personal details
- Born: January 29, 1792 St. Johnsbury, Vermont, U.S.
- Died: June 27, 1852 (aged 60) South Kingstown, Rhode Island, U.S.
- Resting place: Swan Point Cemetery, Providence, Rhode Island
- Party: Whig
- Spouse(s): Sally Lyman Arnold; Catherine Shannard Arnold
- Relations: Jonathan Arnold; Theodore F. Green; Isaac P. Rodman
- Children: Richard Arnold; Sally Lyman Arnold
- Education: Dartmouth College
- Profession: Law

Lemuel Hastings Arnold (January 29, 1792 – June 27, 1852) was an American politician from the U.S. state of Rhode Island. A Whig, he served as the 12th governor of the State of Rhode Island and a member of the U.S. House of Representatives.

== Early life ==
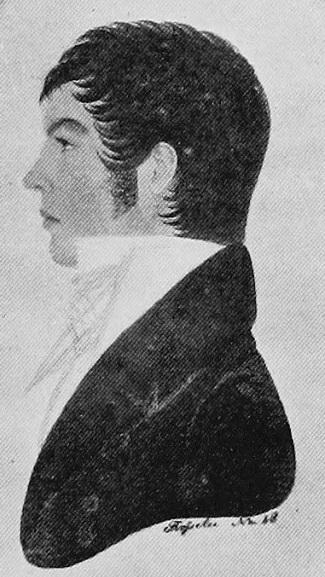
Portrait of Arnold at about the time of his Dartmouth College graduation

Arnold was born in St. Johnsbury, Vermont, the son of Congress of the Confederation delegate Jonathan Arnold and Cynthia (Hastings) Arnold. His father died soon after his birth, and Arnold's mother moved the family to Rhode Island. He attended the local schools and graduated from Dartmouth College in 1811. Arnold then studied law and was admitted to the bar in 1814. He began the practice of law in Providence, Rhode Island, and practiced law there for seven years before becoming involved in manufacturing.

== Career ==
He began his political career as a member of the Rhode Island House of Representatives, serving in the State House from 1826 to 1831. In 1831, he was elected Governor of the State of Rhode Island, and served as governor from 1831 to 1833. Arnold also served as a member of the Rhode Island Executive Council during the Dorr Rebellion from 1842 to 1843.

Following an unsuccessful attempt for a seat in the United States Senate in 1845, he was elected to the United States House of Representatives as a member of the Whig Party and served one term from 1845 to 1847.

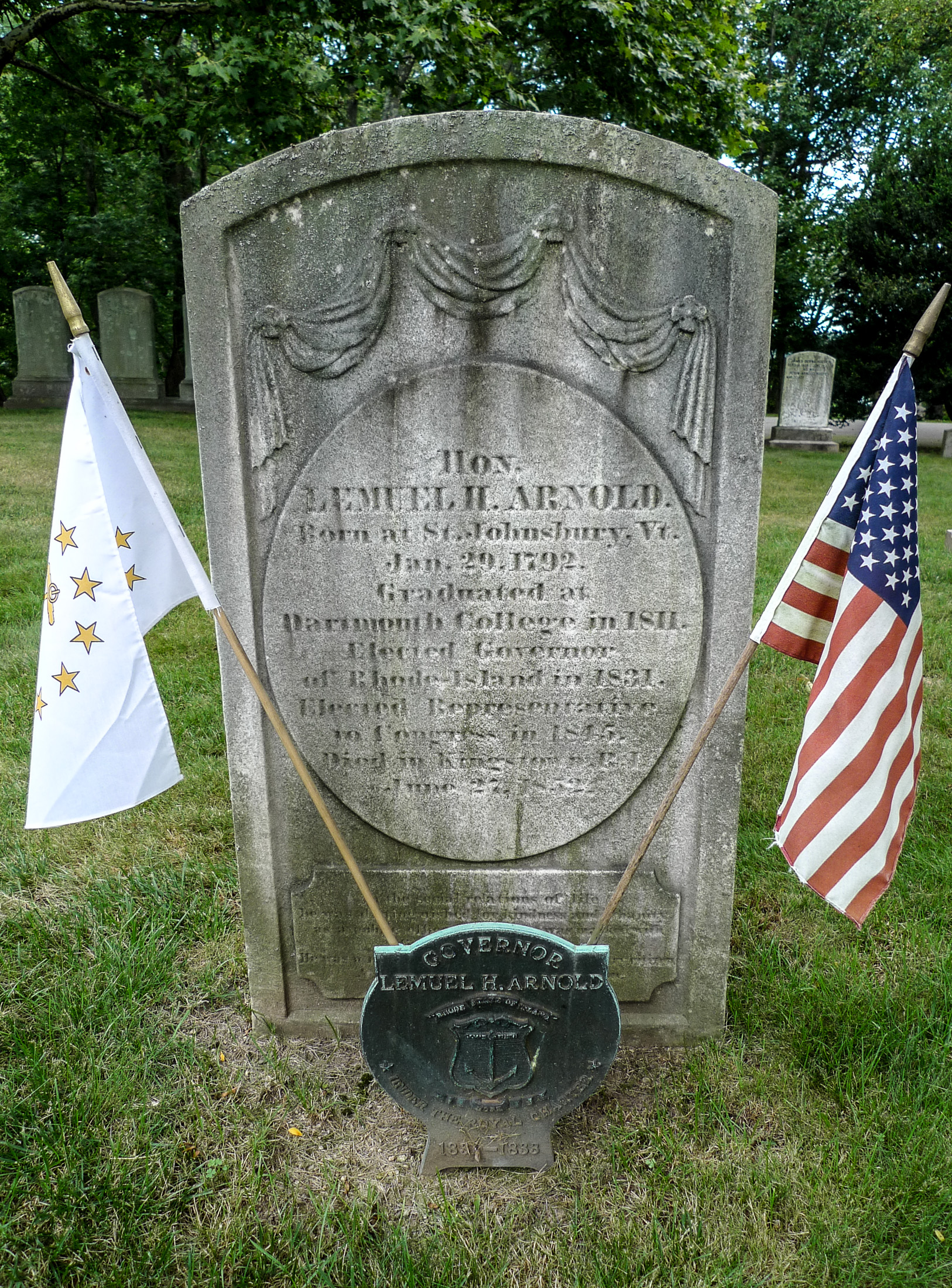
Grave of Lemuel Arnold at Swan Point Cemetery, Rhode Island

After leaving politics, he practiced law in South Kingstown, Rhode Island, until his death on June 27, 1852. He is interred in Swan Point Cemetery in Providence.

== Family life ==
Arnold was the great-great-uncle of U.S. Senator Theodore F. Green.

Arnold married Sally Lyman, and they had nine children. Their son, Richard Arnold, was a brigadier general in the Union Army during the Civil War. Their daughter, Sally Lyman Arnold, was married to Union Brig. Gen. Isaac P. Rodman, who was mortally wounded at the Battle of Antietam. After his wife Sally's death, Arnold married Catherine Shannard.

Party political offices
First	National Republican nominee for Governor of Rhode Island; 1831, 1832	Succeeded by None
Political offices
Preceded by James Fenner	Governor of Rhode Island; 1831–1833	Succeeded by John Brown Francis
U.S. House of Representatives
Preceded by Elisha R. Potter	Member of the U.S. House of Representatives from Rhode Island's 2nd congressional district 1845–1847	Succeeded by Benjamin Babock Thurston
