= Henry J. Spooner =

American politician

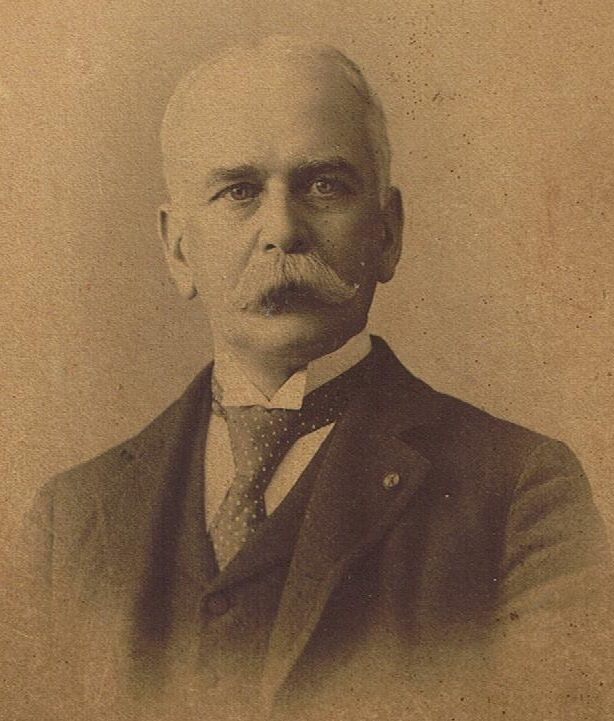

Member of the U.S. House of Representatives from Rhode Island's 1st district
- In office December 5, 1881 – March 3, 1891
- Preceded by: Nelson W. Aldrich
- Succeeded by: Oscar Lapham

Member of the Rhode Island House of Representatives
- In office 1875-1881

Personal details
- Born: August 6, 1839 Providence, Rhode Island, U.S.
- Died: February 9, 1918 (aged 78) Providence, Rhode Island, U.S.
- Resting place: Swan Point Cemetery
- Party: Republican
- Education: Brown University

Military service
- Allegiance: (United States) United States; Union
- Branch/service: United States Army; Union Army
- Years of service: 1862 – 1865
- Rank: Second Lieutenant
- Unit: 4th Rhode Island Infantry
- Battles/wars: American Civil War

Henry Joshua Spooner (August 6, 1839 – February 9, 1918) was a United States representative from Rhode Island.

== Early life ==
Born in Providence, Rhode Island, Spooner attended the common schools and graduated from Brown University in 1860. During his undergraduate career Spooner became a member of Theta Delta Chi. After graduation, he studied law.

== Civil War service ==
Spooner entered the Union Army in 1862 as second lieutenant in the 4th Rhode Island Infantry Regiment. He later served as the regiment's adjutant with the rank of first lieutenant. He served in the Army of the Potomac and the Army of the James, mostly in the XVIII Corps. Later, he was elected a companion of the Massachusetts Commandery of the Military Order of the Loyal Legion of the United States.

== Law career ==
After the end of the Civil War, Spooner was admitted to the bar in 1865 and commenced practice in Providence. In 1847, Spooner joined future Providence mayor Augustus S. Miller in partnership in a law firm, which later included Arthur J. Brown.

== Political career ==
He became the commander of the department of Rhode Island, Grand Army of the Republic, in 1877, before joining the political ranks as member of the Rhode Island House of Representatives from 1875 to 1881. During his career in the state house, Spooner served as speaker 1879–1881.

In 1881 he was elected as a Republican to the 47th United States Congress to fill the vacancy caused by the resignation of Nelson W. Aldrich and he was reelected to the Forty-eighth and to the three succeeding Congresses and served from December 5, 1881, to March 3, 1891. While in Congress, Spooner served as chairman of United States House Committee on Accounts during the 51st United States Congress. In 1890, Spooner was an unsuccessful candidate for reelection to Congress.

After a 12 year political hiatus, he returned to the Rhode Island State House of Representatives in 1902. He also resumed the practice of law in Providence. Spooner died in that city February 9, 1918, and was interred at Swan Point Cemetery.

U.S. House of Representatives
Preceded by Nelson W. Aldrich	Member of the U.S. House of Representatives from Rhode Island's 1st congressional district December 5, 1881 – March 3, 1891	Succeeded by Oscar Lapham
