= Richard Arnold (general) =

U.S. Army officer

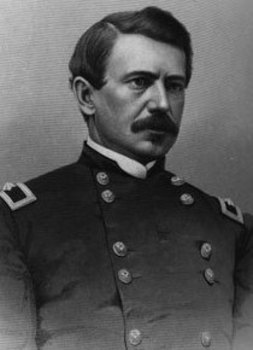
- Major General Richard Arnold
- Born: April 12, 1828; Providence, Rhode Island, U.S.
- Died: November 8, 1882 (aged 54); New York City, New York, U.S.
- Burial place: Swan Point Cemetery, Providence, Rhode Island
- Relatives: Isaac P. Rodman (brother-in-law)
- Military career
- Allegiance: United States of America; Union
- Branch: United States Army; Union Army
- Service years: 1850–1882
- Rank: Brigadier General; Brevet Major General
- Conflicts: American Civil War; First Battle of Bull Run; Seven Days Battles; Siege of Port Hudson; Red River Campaign; Mobile Campaign

Richard Arnold (April 12, 1828 – November 8, 1882) was a career U.S. Army officer who served as a brigadier general in the Union forces during the American Civil War. His artillery helped force the surrender of two important Confederate towns, including Mobile, Alabama.

== Early life and background ==
Arnold was the son of Rhode Island governor and United States congressman Lemuel Arnold, was born in Providence, Rhode Island, in 1828, graduated from the United States Military Academy in 1850. His classmates included Eugene A. Carr and Cuvier Grover, who would serve alongside him in the Trans-Mississippi Theater during the Civil War. His antebellum service included various routine posts in Florida, California, and the Pacific Northwest. Arnold was promoted to captain in the Regular Army and became an aide-de-camp to Major General John E. Wool.

== Civil war ==
Shortly after the start of the Civil War, Arnold commanded Battery D of the 2nd U.S. Artillery at the First Battle of Bull Run, and was forced to abandon his guns during the ensuing Union rout. In 1862, he served in various staff positions with the Army of the Potomac, including as a division artillery chief and Assistant Inspector General for the VI Corps.

After the Seven Days Battles, he received a commission as a brigadier general of the volunteers and was transferred to the Department of the Gulf, where he was assigned as Chief of Artillery. He served in this capacity for two years, except for a two-month temporary stint as Chief of Cavalry after Brig. Gen. Albert L. Lee was relieved from duty during the Red River Campaign. At the Siege of Port Hudson, Arnold directed the siege artillery that precipitated the surrender of the fort and town. He later commanded the artillery that would compel the surrender of Mobile, Alabama. He received a brevet promotion to major general dating from March 1865.

== Postbellum career ==
After the war, he reverted to his regular army rank of captain and served in a variety of posts with the 5th U.S. Artillery. He was elevated to major in 1875. In 1882, while stationed on Governor's Island in New York City, he received a promotion to lieutenant colonel, but died five days later. He was buried in Swan Point Cemetery in Providence.

== Family ==
Arnold's brother-in-law, Union Brig. Gen. Isaac P. Rodman, was mortally wounded at the Battle of Antietam.

In 1849, Arnold built Myrtle Grove Plantation in Richmond Hill, Georgia, as a wedding gift for his daughter.

== Legacy ==
The World War II mine planter USS Dick Arnold was named in the general's honor. Ten sailors were killed when the Dick sprang a leak during a storm off Portsmouth, New Hampshire, and sank in January 1942.

== See also ==
- List of American Civil War generals (Union)
