= Daniel Mowry Jr. =

American politician

Daniel Mowry Jr. (August 27, 1729 – July 6, 1806) was an American cooper and farmer from Smithfield, Rhode Island. He served as a delegate for Rhode Island in the Continental Congress from 1780 to 1782.

== Family and early life ==
Daniel Jr. was the son of Captain Daniel (1697–1787) and Mary Steere (c. 1700 – 1776) Mowry. His family had been and remained prominent in Smithfield for a number of years. Besides his father, the family included farmers, militia leaders, and tavern keepers. Young Daniel learned a trade as a barrel maker, entered commerce, and later opened a tavern of his own. He never attended school, but his parents taught him to read at an early age.

Daniel Jr. married three times, first to Anne Phillips (1724 - Sep. 18, 1753) on 27 Aug 1747, then on Aug. 19, 1756 to Amey Arnold (1736-1758), widow of Thomas Arnold, and the third time to Catherine Steere, (Jun. 30, 1749 to April 4, 1827), daughter of Anthony and Rachel Steere. He had a total of six children.

== Public service ==
Mowry began public service in 1760 as the town clerk. He represented Providence County in the colony's General Assembly for many years, and he became an active supporter of revolutionary activities. He was first elected in 1766 and served until 1779. During the Revolutionary War he served in the local militia, first as a Captain and later a Major in Peleg Arnold's Battalion.

For many years he had also served as a Justice of the Peace in Smithfield, and from 1776 he served as a judge in the county's court of Common Pleas. He was named by the Rhode Island assembly to represent to state in the Continental Congress in 1780. He returned home in 1782 and engaged in farming for the rest of his life.

He served in the general assembly most of the time from May, 1766, until he was elected judge of the court of common pleas in October, 1776. Reelected judge in 1777, 78, 79, 80. In May, 1776 he was a member of the general assembly when it passed the famous Independence Act just two months before the Declaration of Independence by congress. In May, 1780 with James M. Varnum, Ezekiel Cornell and John Collins he was chosen representative from the state in congress and he served for a year refusing reelection .

In 1774 he was appointed a census taker and had the same appointment in 1776, when he was on a committee to superintend the erection of fortifications and at the same time was given the duty of moving to the Battery at Fox Point certain ordnance. The next year he was on a committee to number all those capable of bearing arms, and in 1779 on a committee to estimate the taxable property in the state.

For twenty years he was town clerk.

== Death ==
Mowry died at home in Smithfield and was buried in a family plot.
