= Francis H. Schell =

American artist

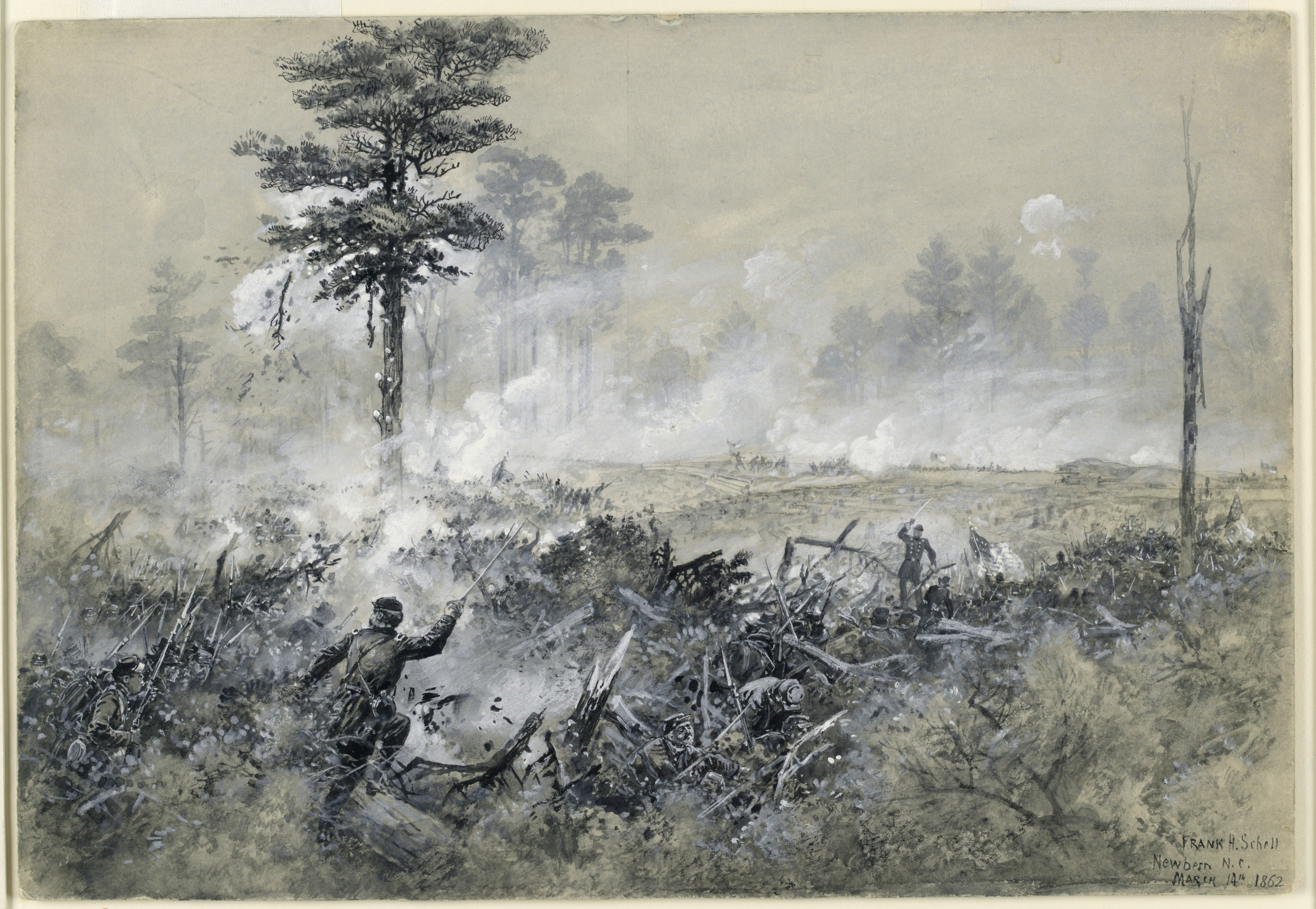
Assault of the Union Troops Upon Fort Thompson, Near New Bearne, ca. 1862 by Francis H. Schell

Francis H. Schell (1834–1909) was an American artist, illustrator, and lithographer, active in Philadelphia and New York. Many of his works appeared in Frank Leslie's Illustrated Newspaper, where he headed the art department, the Century, and several other publications.
