= The Peking Express =

2023 book by James M. Zimmerman

- Author: James Zimmerman
- Language: English
- Genre: History, Non-fiction
- Published: 2023
- Publisher: PublicAffairs
- Publication place: United States

The Peking Express: The Bandits Who Stole a Train, Stunned the West, and Broke the Republic of China by James M. Zimmerman is a non-fiction book published in 2023 about the Lincheng Outrage of 1923. The book features accounts and tells the story from the perspectives of individuals such as John Powell, Lucy Aldrich, Giuseppe Musso, and Sun Meiyao.

== Reception ==
The book was praised for being well researched and captivating.

== See also ==
- Midnight in Peking
- Lincheng Outrage
- Murder on the Orient Express
