= Peking Express (disambiguation) =

Peking Express is a Dutch/Flemish reality game show.

Peking Express may also refer to:

- Peking Express (film), 1951 film starring Joseph Cotten, Corinne Calvet and Edmund Gwenn
  - Shanghai Express (film), 1932 film remade in 1951 as Peking Express
