= Night Plane from Chungking =

1942 film by Ralph Murphy

- Theatrical release poster
- Directed by: Ralph Murphy
- Written by: Lester Cole; Earl Fenton; Theodore Reeves; Sidney Biddell (adaptation); Harry Hervey (story)
- Produced by: Michael Kraike; Walter MacEwen
- Starring: Robert Preston; Ellen Drew; Otto Kruger; Stephen Geray
- Cinematography: Theodor Sparkuhl
- Edited by: Ellsworth Hoagland
- Music by: Gerard Carbonara
- Distributed by: Paramount Pictures
- Release date: May 31, 1943 (New York City)
- Running time: 69 minutes
- Country: United States
- Language: English

Night Plane from Chungking (also known as China Pass and Sky Over China) is a 1943 American war film released by Paramount Pictures, directed by Ralph Murphy, and produced by Michael Kraike and Walter MacEwen from a screenplay by Lester Cole, Earl Fenton and Theodore Reeves, adapted by Sidney Biddell from the 1931 story by Harry Hervey. The film stars Robert Preston and Ellen Drew, with Otto Kruger and Stephen Geray.

Night Plane from Chungking was a remake of Paramount's earlier film Shanghai Express (1932). The film was remade as Peking Express (1951).

== Plot ==
In 1942, during the Japanese invasion of China, due to the carelessness of one of the passengers, Albert Pasavy (Otto Kruger), draws attention from Japanese bombers overhead, to a bus travelling to India along a muddy road. The Japanese bomb the road, hitting a munitions truck carrying Chinese troops. The Chinese officer in charge, demands his wounded be put on the bus and brought to a secret air field. Among the stranded passengers met by U.S. pilot Nick Stanton (Robert Preston), are a beautiful Red Cross nurse, Ann Richards (Ellen Drew), and her traveling companion, Madame Wu (Soo Yong), who is on a secret diplomatic mission. There is also Countess Olga Karagin (Tamara Geva), who is caught spying.

Nick and his co-pilot, Captain Po (Victor Sen Yung), are ordered to fly the remainder of the passengers out to safety in India, but the transport aircraft is intercepted by Japanese fighter aircraft and shot down. Nick makes an emergency landing in a jungle. Over the radio, Nick learns that Olga has committed suicide, but the spy was trying to get top-secret information to her superior, who is still among the passengers.

Another of the passengers, Doctor Van der Linden (Stephen Geray), goes missing, but returns with food he claims comes from a nearby monastery. The doctor leads everyone on a long hike to the monastery, only to reveal there that he is a Nazi collaborator working with the Japanese. He demands to know where Olga is, not knowing she is dead. All the survivors are captured and held at the monastery.

It is up to Nick to try to come up with an escape plan. He convinces Van Der Linden to allow Po to repair the aircraft and to allow the hostages to be exchanged for Olga. A coded message is sent to Nick's headquarters, but the Nazi soon finds out that Olga is already dead. After Pasavy betrays the others and is coldly shot, Nick kills Van der Linden. With Japanese troops in pursuit, Major Raoul Brissac (Ernest Dorian) sacrifices himself to save the others by pulling the pin on a grenade, killing himself along with the Japanese. Nick, Po, Ann and Madame Wu then fly to safety. Having fallen in love, Nick and Ann vow to reunite after the war.

== Cast ==
- Robert Preston as Captain Nick Stanton
- Ellen Drew as Ann Richards
- Stephen Geray as Doctor Ven Der Lieden
- Otto Kruger as Albert Pasavy
- Victor Sen Yung as Captain Po
- Tamara Geva as Countess Olga Karagin
- Soo Yong as Madame Wu
- Ernest Dorian as Major Raoul Brissac
- Angel Cruz as Japanese soldier
- Allen Jung as Lieutenant Tang
- Leonard Strong as Lieutenant Karuma
- Lee Tung Foo as Bus driver

== Production ==
Principal photography on Night Plane from Chungking took place from mid-August to September 11, 1942.

== Reception ==
In his review for The New York Times, Thomas Pryor noted that Night Plane from Chungking made an attempt to be topical. "For this is another in the growing list of Hollywood melodramatic exercises in which the war is dragged in simply to give an old story formula a semblance of freshness. In this case Paramount even stretched a point in labeling the film 'Night Plane From Chungking', for it is by the merest of coincidences that the characters get aboard a transport plane on their way to the Indian frontier, and at that they are quickly shot down by a squadron of Japs."

Film historian Alun Evans in Brassey's Guide to War Films, considered Night Plane from Chungking "just another variant on 'Shanghair Expres', this time in the air."
