= USS Herreshoff No. 309 =

Patrol vessel of the United States Navy

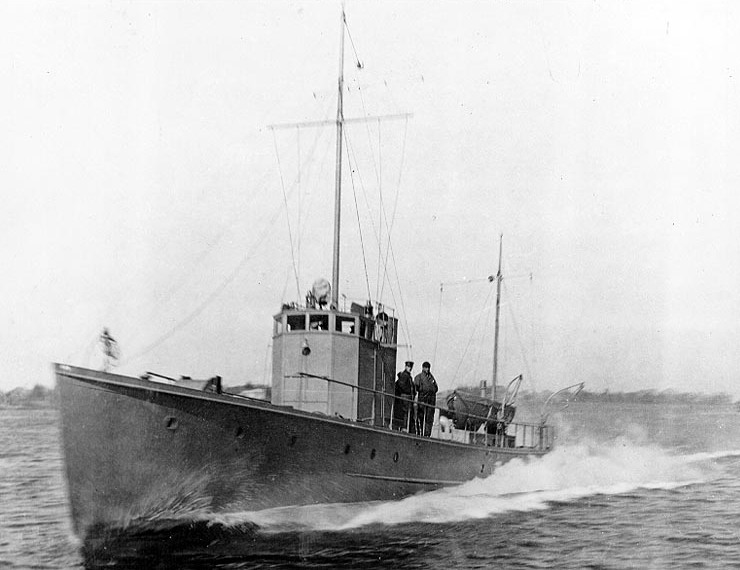
- USS Herreshoff No. 309 (SP-1218) on sea trials off Rhode Island in 1917.

History

United States
- Name: USS Herreshoff No. 309
- Namesake: Previous name retained
- Builder: Herreshoff Manufacturing Company, Bristol, Rhode Island
- Completed: 1917
- Acquired: 26 October 1917
- Commissioned: 15 November 1917
- Fate: Returned to owner 31 December 1918
- Notes: Operated as private motorboat Herreshoff No. 309 1917 and from 1919

General characteristics
- Type: Patrol vessel
- Displacement: 25 tons
- Length: 80 ft (24 m)
- Beam: 12 ft 6 in (3.81 m)
- Draft: 3 ft 6 in (1.07 m)
- Speed: 17 knots
- Armament: 1 × 3-pounder gun; 1 × 1-pounder gun

USS Herreshoff No. 309 (SP-1218), also written Herreshoff #309, was a United States Navy patrol vessel in commission from 1917 to 1918.

Herreshoff No. 309 was built as a private motorboat of the same name in 1917 by the Herreshoff Manufacturing Company at Bristol, Rhode Island, for Winthrop W. Aldrich of Newport, Rhode Island. She was designed and built with the intention that Aldrich would make her available to the U.S. Navy for war service. Accordingly, the U.S. Navy leased her from Aldrich in 1917 for use as a section patrol boat during World War I. Aldrich delivered her to the Navy on 26 October 1917 and she was commissioned as USS Herreshoff No. 309 (SP-1218) on 15 November 1917.

Assigned to the 2nd Naval District in southern New England and based at Newport, Herreshoff No. 309 served on patrol duties in Rhode Island waters, both in Long Island Sound off Block Island and in Narragansett Bay, for the rest of World War I.

The Navy returned Herreshoff No. 309 to Aldrich on 31 December 1918.

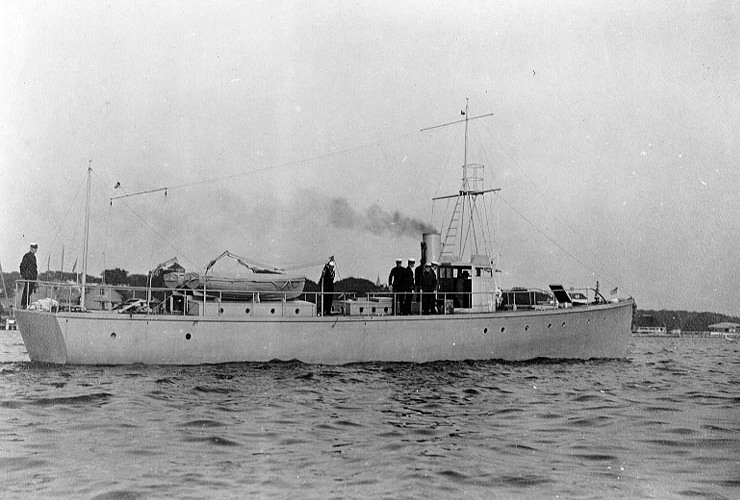
USS Herreshoff No. 309 (SP-1218) sometime in 1917 or 1918.
