= Winthrop W. Aldrich =

American banker and financier (1885–1974)

His Excellency Winthrop W. Aldrich GBE
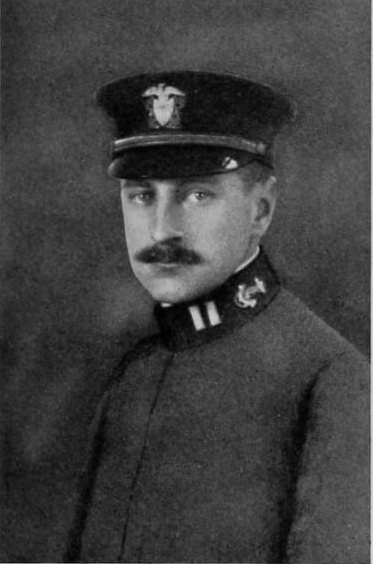
- Aldrich during World War I

49th United States Ambassador to the United Kingdom
- In office February 2, 1953 – February 1, 1957
- President: Dwight D. Eisenhower
- Preceded by: Walter S. Gifford
- Succeeded by: John Hay Whitney

Personal details
- Born: Winthrop Williams Aldrich; November 2, 1885 Providence, Rhode Island, U.S.
- Died: February 25, 1974 (aged 88) New York City, U.S.
- Spouse: Harriet Alexander
- Children: 5
- Parents: Nelson W. Aldrich; Abby Pearce Chapman
- Relatives: Lucy Aldrich (sister); Abby Aldrich Rockefeller (sister); Richard S. Aldrich (brother)
- Education: Harvard University
- Occupation: Banker

Winthrop Williams Aldrich GBE (November 2, 1885 – February 25, 1974) was an American banker and financier, scion of a prominent and powerful political family, and U.S. Ambassador to the United Kingdom.

== Early years ==
Aldrich was born in Rhode Island in 1885, to Rhode Island Senator Nelson W. Aldrich and the former Abigail Pearce Truman Chapman. He attended Harvard University, receiving a bachelor's degree in 1907 and a J.D. degree in 1910. Among his ten siblings was brother Richard S. Aldrich, who served in Congress from 1923 to 1933, and sisters Lucy Aldrich, an art collector, and Abby Aldrich, who became the wife of financier and philanthropist John D. Rockefeller Jr.

== Career ==
During the First World War Aldrich had built, at his own expense, the patrol boat USS Herreshoff No. 309 which was leased by Aldrich to the U.S. Navy and patrolled the waters off of Rhode Island from November 15, 1917, to December 31, 1918, when it was returned to Aldrich.

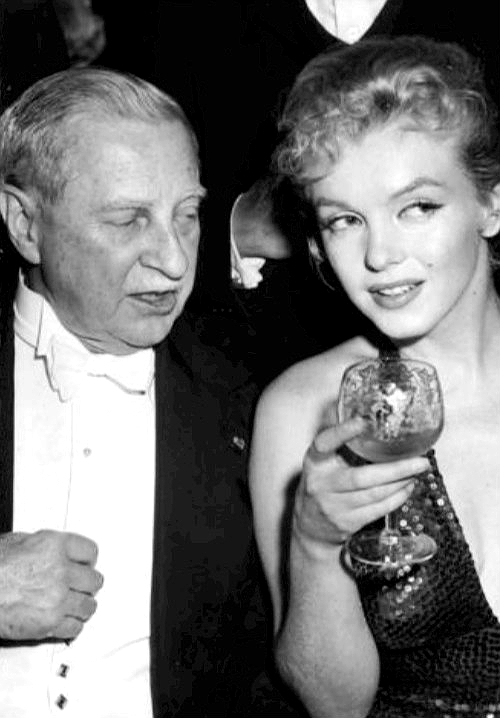
Aldrich with Marilyn Monroe, 1957

Aldrich had been commissioned a lieutenant (junior grade) in the Naval Reserve and was called to active duty on April 8, 1917, and was assigned to the Naval Training Station in Newport, Rhode Island. He transferred to the USS Niagara (SP-136) in September and was assigned as the ship's navigator. He was reassigned to the USS New Orleans (CL-22) in June 1918 and served on convoy duty. He was promoted to lieutenant on June 1 of the same year and, after the armistice, was released from active duty in December.

=== Business career ===
Aldrich served as president and chairman of the board of Chase National Bank from 1930 to 1953. He served as commodore of the New York Yacht Club from 1932 to 1934. In 1946, his nephew David Rockefeller joined Chase National Bank and would later become the chairman. During and after World War II, as president of the British War Relief Society and the National War Fund Inc., he supported relief efforts and financial assistance to the United Kingdom and Europe. For this work he received the King's Medal for Service in the Cause of Freedom and in 1947 was invested by King George VI as an honorary Knight Grand Cross of the British Empire (GBE).

=== U.S. Ambassador to the U.K. ===
On February 2, 1953, he was appointed the US Ambassador to the United Kingdom under President Dwight D. Eisenhower. He presented his credentials on February 20, 1953, and remained in London while Winston Churchill was Prime Minister and Queen Elizabeth II was the reigning monarch, until his mission was terminated on February 1, 1957. He belonged to and served on the boards of many charitable organizations.

== Personal life ==
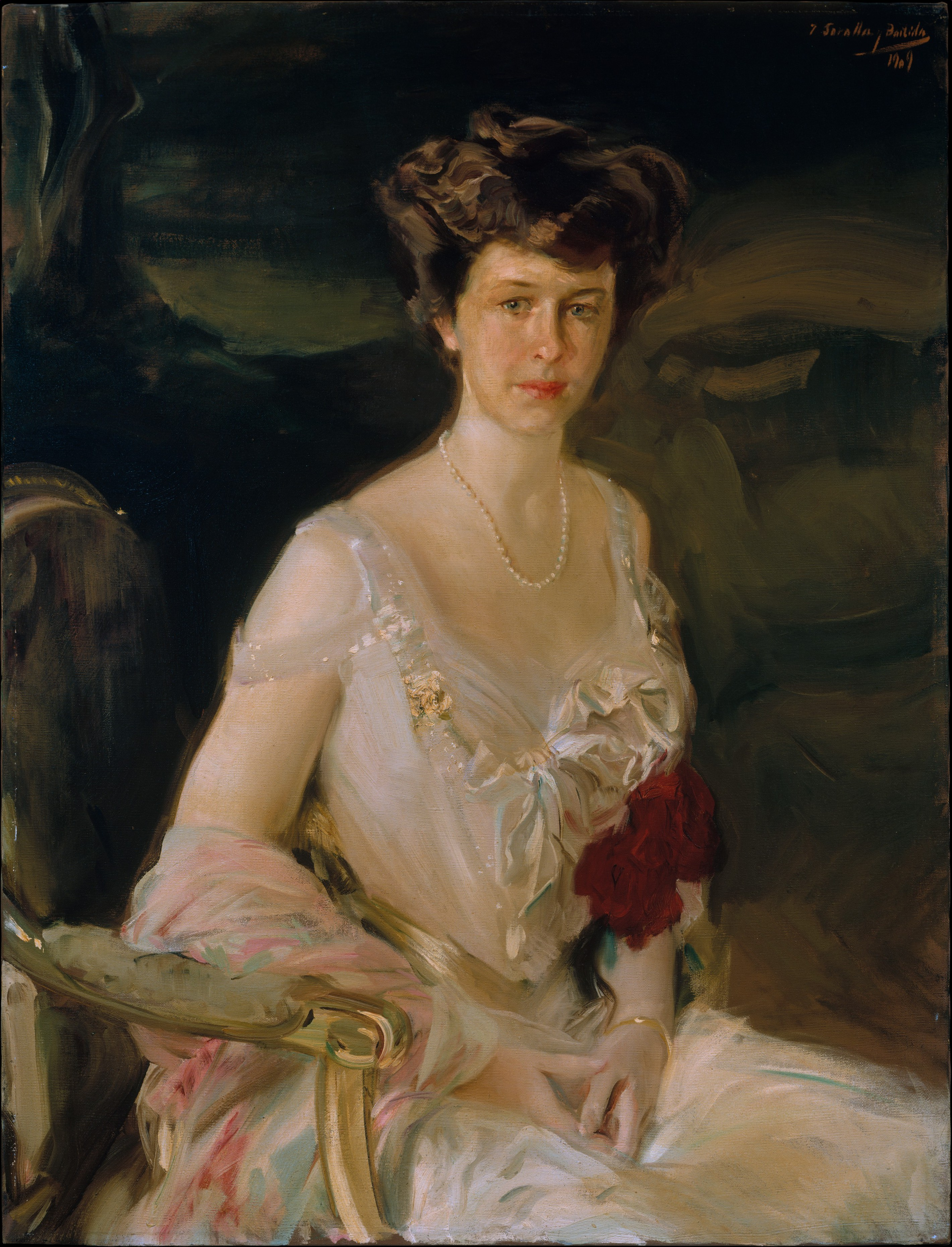
Portrait of his wife, Harriet Alexander, in 1909 before their marriage, by Joaquín Sorolla.

In 1916, Aldrich was married to Harriet Alexander at the Fifth Avenue Presbyterian Church. Guests at their wedding included "representatives of the Astor, Fish, Harriman, Rockefeller, Crocker, Webb, Rhinelander, Cutting, Vanderbilt, Bacon and other well-known families." Harriet was the eldest daughter of Harriet (née Crocker) Alexander and Charles Beatty Alexander of New York City and Tuxedo Park, New York and the granddaughter of railroad executive Charles Crocker. Her younger sisters were Jannetta and Mary Crocker Alexander, who married Sheldon Whitehouse in 1920. Together, they were the parents of:

- Mary Aldrich (b. 1921), who married Robert Homans, a lawyer with the San Francisco law firm of Morrison, Holloway, Schuman & Clark.
- Harriet Aldrich (1922–2014), who married Dr. Edgar A. Bering Jr.
- Lucy Truman Aldrich, who married David Wetmore Devens, a son Arthur Lithgow Devens III, in 1945. They divorced and she remarried to her first cousin, George Davenport Aldrich, in 1971. After his death, she married lawyer Francis Hooks Burr in 1979.
- Alexander "Sam" Aldrich (1928–2017), who married Elizabeth Hollins Elliott and, later, Phyllis Williamson and served as the Commissioner of the Office of Parks and Recreation of New York State.
- Elizabeth Brewster "Liberty" Aldrich, who married J. Woodward Redmond in 1946.

He was an amateur musician and an artist whose specialty was watercolor seascapes. As a yachtsman he was navigator, under skipper Harold S. Vanderbilt, of the 1930 America's Cup J Class defender Enterprise. He built a 40-room manor on 108 acres in Brookville on Long Island.

Aldrich died at his home, 960 Fifth Avenue in New York City, on February 25, 1974.

=== Honors ===
In 1947, he was appointed an honorary Knight Grand Cross of the Order of the British Empire by King George VI. This entitled him to use the postnominal letters GBE, but not to the prenominal title "Sir" as he was not a British subject.

He was a member of the New York Young Republican Club and the exclusive and prestigious Pilgrims Society.

Business positions
Preceded by Albert H. Wiggin	Chase CEO; 1930–1953	Succeeded by John J. McCloy
