= Lincheng Outrage =

The Lincheng Outrage, also known as the Lincheng Incident (Chinese: 临城劫车案; pinyin: Lín chéng jié chē àn), refers to the seizure of the luxury "Blue Express" train traveling between Shanghai and Beijing and the taking of over 300 hostages by bandits near the town of Lincheng County (present-day Xuecheng District, Zaozhuang), Shandong Province, China on the night of May 5–6, 1923.

== Attack and hostage-taking ==
On May 5, 1923, twelve hundred bandits, mostly former soldiers under General Zhang Jingyao who followed Shandong warlord Sun Meiyao (孙美瑶) after their discharge from the military, attacked and then derailed the "Blue Express" near the town of Lincheng (Xuecheng) on the Tianjin-Pukou Railway in Shandong Province close to the Jiangsu-Shandong border. The bandits looted the train and killed a number of Chinese passengers as well as a British subject, Joseph Rothman after he refused to surrender his valuables. They took 300 passengers hostage, including 25 westerners, most of whom were Americans. British, French, Italian, German, and Danish nationals were also among those captured. The hostages were forced on a 10-day march to the bandits' mountain base at Paotzeku. Some of the more prominent hostages included Lucy Aldrich, eldest daughter of U.S. Senator Nelson W. Aldrich of Rhode Island and sister-in-law of John D. Rockefeller Jr., J. B. Powell, editor of China Weekly Review, and Commodore Guiseppe Musso, a wealthy and influential Italian who was the chief attorney in the Shanghai French Concession.

The women were released within a couple of days of the kidnapping, while the remaining male hostages were held for over a month as negotiations led by the U.S. Minister to China Dr. Jacob Gould Schurman and American China hand Roy Scott Anderson took place. The bandits demanded as ransom the removal of Chinese government troops from Shandong, an official pardon for the kidnappers, reinstatement or enrollment into the army for those among the bandits who wished it, and guarantees by six foreign powers that the demands would be met. Ultimately the Shanghai Green Gang leader Du Yuesheng secured the release of the remaining hostages on June 12, 1923 with an $85,000 ransom ($1.6 million in today's prices).

== Aftermath ==
Many of the bandits were accepted into the military and Sun Meiyao and other leaders received military commissions. Within six months, most of the bandits accepted into the military were machine-gunned and their chief, Sun Meiyao, was executed at the Zhongxing coal mine for suspected ongoing ties to local bandits.

Four Chinese officials named in foreign sanctions were removed from their posts, including the Military Governor of Shan Dong, Tian Zhong Yu. At the same time, the President elevated Tian to Fu Jiang Jun, or College of Marshals. As this was a contradiction of the demands made by diplomatic bodies, the Chinese Minister for Foreign Affairs Wellington Koo submitted his resignation in protest. A publication was subsequently made in the newspaper which clarified that the promotion actually preceded the resignation and Koo withdrew his resignation.

The capture of the "Blue Express" created an international sensation and symbolized for many the collapse of legitimacy of the Chinese government. Following the incident, foreign governments pressured the Chinese to increase security along railway lines. Expatriate communities in China feared the episode signaled a new "Boxer Rebellion" and put into question the stability of the Chinese government. As a result, foreign powers urged that railway security be placed under foreign control. The Chinese government resisted, instead placing the railway system under military control and creating a special railway guard under the command of General Tang Zaili. Armed guards were placed on every train. Foreign powers also used the incident to place financial pressure on the fragile Chinese government, demanding indemnities and compensation for medical expenses for foreign hostages and repayment of lost earnings.

== Legacy ==
=== Similar attacks ===
In 1932 Manchuria was plagued by a large series of similar luxury trains attacks with great similarities.

=== Popular media ===
The Lincheng Outrage provided the inspiration for the 1932 Marlene Dietrich film Shanghai Express. It also was the subject of The Peking Express.
