= Harry Hervey =

American screenwriter (1900–1951)

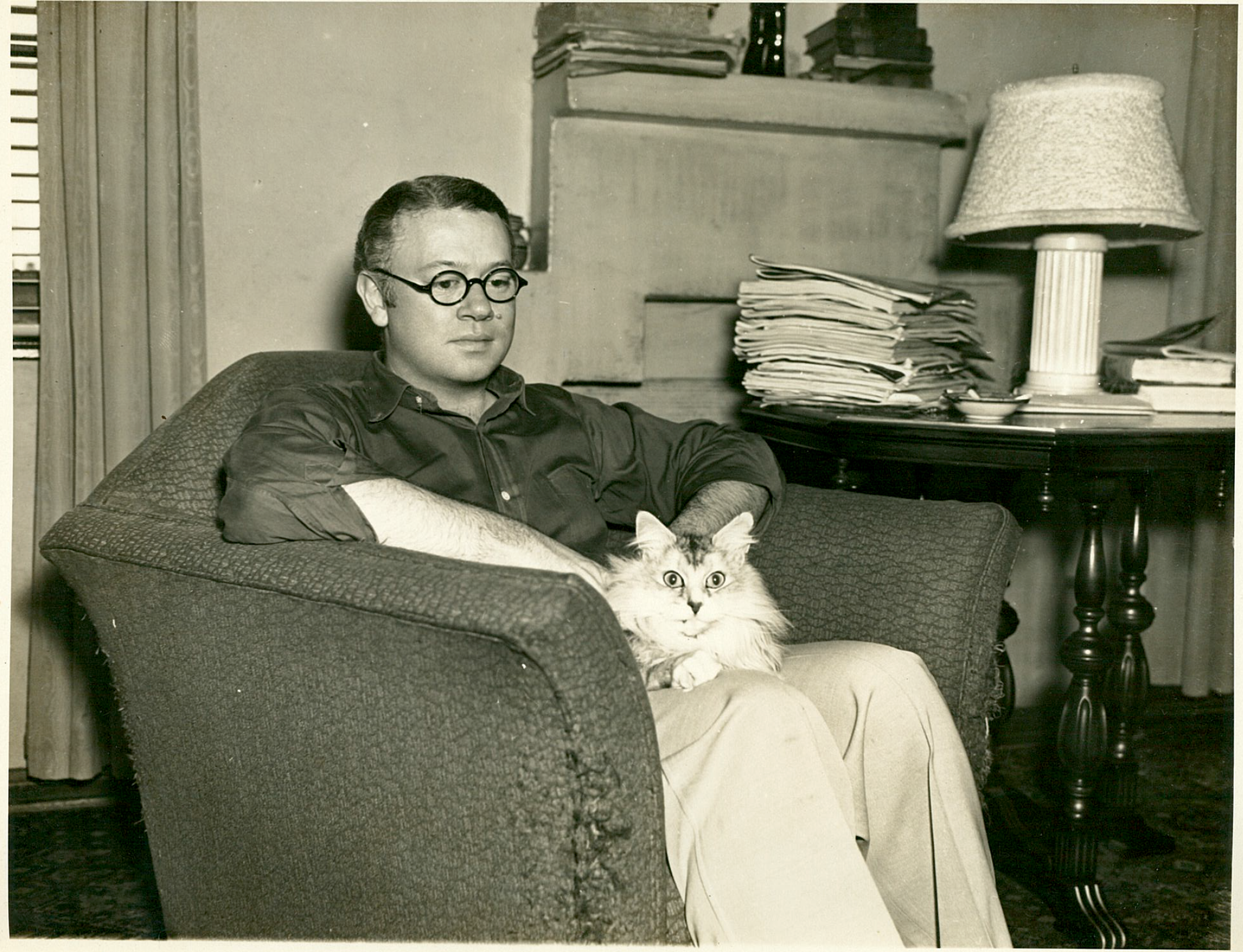
Harry Hervey, ca. 1933

Harry Hervey (November 5, 1900 – August 12, 1951) was one of the most highly sought screenplay writers of the first half of the 20th century, praised by critics of literature, stage and screen.

== Early life ==
Harry Hervey was born on November 5, 1900, in Beaumont, Texas, the son of Harry Clay and Jane Louise Hervey. His father managed small hotels, and therefore the family traveled a lot: Mobile, Tallahassee, Pensacola.

In 1916 Hervey entered Sewannee Military Academy in Tennessee for three years and did the last year of high school at the Georgia Military Academy in Atlanta.

== Career ==
Harry Hervey, at the age of 16, sold an adventurous story to a magazine. He continued to publish more stories to the pulp fiction magazine, Black Mask. After school, Hervey became a reporter for the Atlanta Constitution. He then was a clerk for the Texas Oil Company. His first novel was Caravans By Night, A Romance of India (1922). In 1923 he worked as cruise director, travelling around Asia. Before leaving, Hervey visited his mother, who was managing the DeSoto Hotel, and met Carleton A. Hildreth. They remained together for almost thirty years, until Hervey's death in 1951. In 1925 he undertook a literary expedition to Indochina for Cosmopolitan Book Corporation and McCall's Magazine, accompanied by Hildreth. They searched the lost Khmer city in the jungles of Southeast Asia.

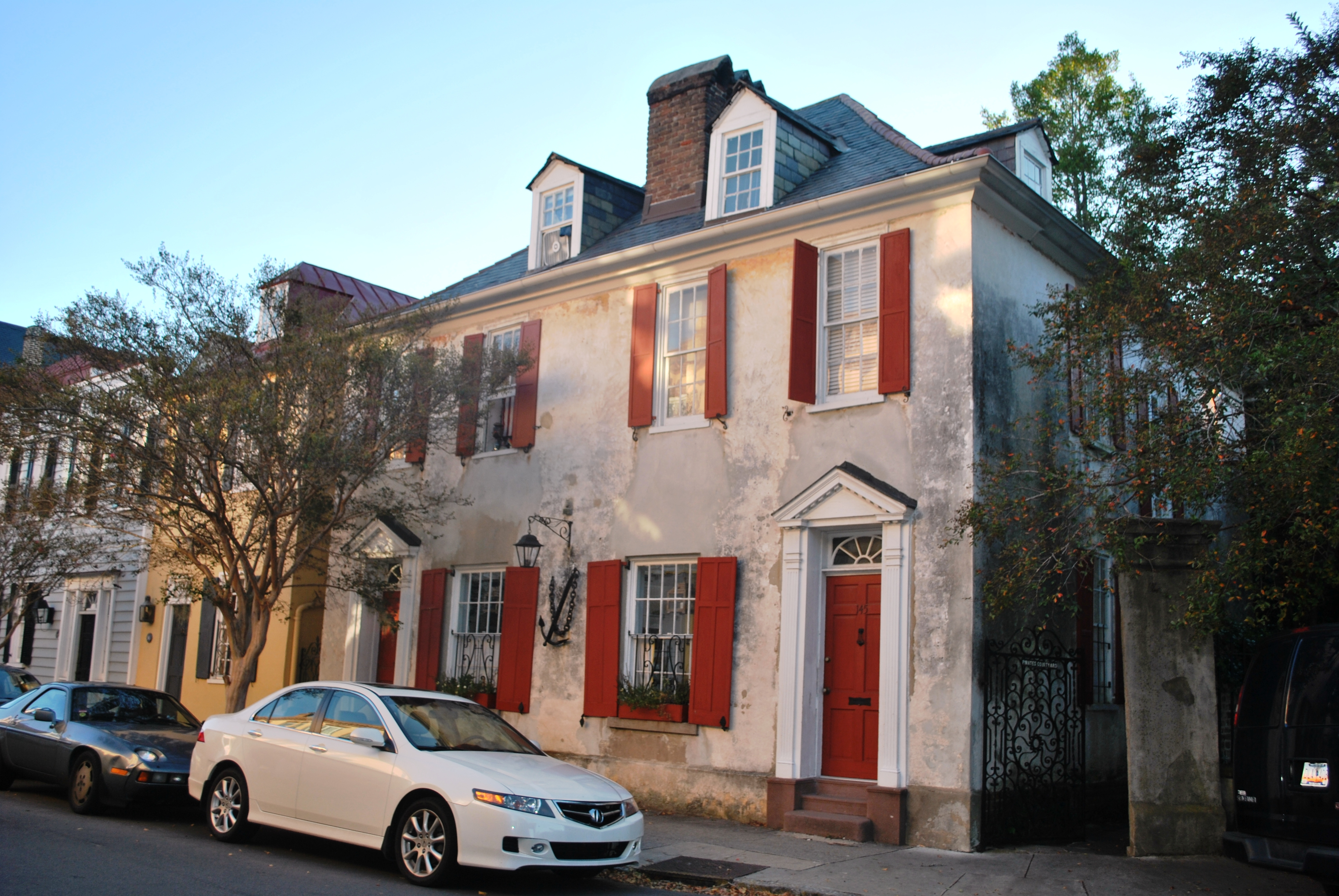
Pirate Houses, Charleston

After the trip to Indochina, Hervey moved to Savannah and lived at the DeSoto Hotel with his mother and Hildreth. In 1926 they moved to Charleston, at 89 East Bay St., one of the Rainbow Row Houses. From 1926 to 1932, they spent the summers in New York City and the winters in Charleston or Savannah.

Together with Hildreth, adapted Congai – Mistress of Indochine (1928) as a play, produced by Sam H. Harris with Valerie Bergere, Devil dance, a play in three acts (1927), Pico Iyer in the foreword to Congai said "Hervey opened the door to the way we would be seeing Indochina—on the page and in our heads—well into the 21st century…even in his wildest moments Hervey caught something true that those of us more than twice his age can only bow before."

In Charleston, South Carolina, Hervey wrote a Jazz Age inspired novel based on the city. The novel was named Red Ending and had gay subtext throughout. The book was published right before the stock market crash in 1929.

The Iron Widow was originally a play as well, but the producers were afraid of the homosexual content of the story; unsuccessful in seeing it produced, Hervey rewrote it as a novel in 1931. During the Great Depression they lost the Rainbow Row House and moved to the 141-145 Church Street, named "Pirate Houses".

In 1931 Paramount Pictures asked Hervey to adapt an old movie, The Cheat, for Tallulah Bankhead; the villain was Japanese, and by that time Hervey was considered an authority in Asian themes. Hervey and Hildreth moved to Hollywood, California, where Hervey worked as screenwriter. He wrote Shanghai Express starring Marlene Dietrich. In 1938 Hervey moved back to Savannah.

By 1951 Hervey's fame, finances and health faded. He died on August 12, 1951, from throat cancer. Hildreth died on March 12, 1977, and is buried at Bonaventure Cemetery, Savannah, Georgia, with Hervey.

In 2013 "King Cobra – Mekong Adventures in French Indochina" was republished, and one year later, in 2014, "Congai – Mistress of Indochine", both with a foreword by Pico Iyer.

== Books ==
- Caravans By Night, A Romance of India (1922), The Century Co, (New York)
- The Black Parrot, A Tale of the Golden Chersonese (1923), The Century Co, (New York)
- Where Strange Gods Call, Pages Out Of The East (1924), The Century Co, (New York)
- Ethan Quest: His saga (1925), Cosmopolitan Book Co (New York)
- Devil dance, a play in three acts (1927)
- Congai, Mistress of Indochine (1928, republished 2014)
- Travels in French Indo-China (1928), Thornton Butterworth, (London)
- King Cobra, Mekong Adventures in French Indochina (1928, republished 2013)
- Red Ending (1929), Horace Liveright (New York)
- The Iron Widow (1931, republished as She-Devil), Horace Liveright (New York)
- The Damned Don’t Cry (1939), The Greystone Press (New York)
- School for eternity (1941), G. P. Putnam's Sons (New York)
- The Veiled Fountain (1941), G. P. Putnam's Sons (New York)
- Barracoon (1950), G. P. Putnam's Sons (New York),

== Screenplays ==
- The Devil Dancer (1927)
- The Cheat (1931)
- Prestige (1932)
- Shanghai Express (1932) (story "Sky Over China")
- The Wiser Sex (1932)
- Devil and the Deep (1932)
- A Passport to Hell (1932) (story Burnt Offering)
- The Devil's in Love (1933) (story Consul of the Damned)
- His Greatest Gamble (1934)
- A Son Comes Home (1936)
- Road to Singapore (1940)
- So's Your Aunt Emma (1942) (story Aunt Emma Paints the Town)
- Night Plane from Chungking (1943) (aka China Pass and Sky Over China, remake of Shanghai Express)
- Saigon (1948)
- Peking Express (1951) (remake of Shanghai Express)

== Legacy ==
The Carleton Hildreth and Harry Hervey papers are hosted by the Georgia Historical Society, Savannah, Georgia.
