= Valerie Bergere =

American stage actress (1867-1938)

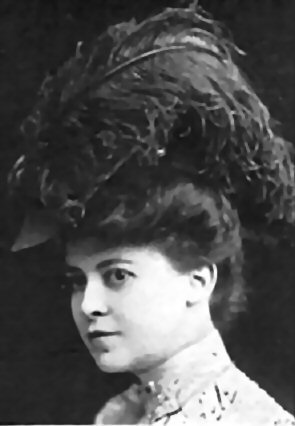
- The Actors' Birthday Book, 1908
- Born: Valerie Zenobia de Beaumont Lieb; February 8, 1867; Metz, Second French Empire
- Died: September 16, 1938 (aged 71); Hollywood, California, U.S.
- Occupation: Actress
- Spouses: Jack Farrell (divorced); Napoleon Edward Daignault (m. 1908, divorced) Herbert Warren (m. 1917)

Valerie Bergere (born Valerie Zenobia de Beaumont Lieb, February 8, 1867 – September 16, 1938) was a French-born American actress who had a near fifty-year career in theatre and cinema. She began in the chorus of a touring opera company before acting in repertory theatre productions for nearly a decade. Bergere rose to play leading roles, but found her true success in vaudeville where for some seventeen years she remained one of the top draws in variety theatre. Over her later years Bergere also took on character roles in some twenty Broadway and Hollywood productions.

== Early life ==
Valerie Zenobia de Beaumont Lieb was born in Metz, Alsace-Lorraine. As Valerie Bergere, she began her theatrical career in about 1890 after a brief stint with a San Francisco newspaper. Bergere first appeared on stage with her sister Leona as a chorus singer with the Conried Opera Company and later as an actress in German-language theatre productions.

== Career ==
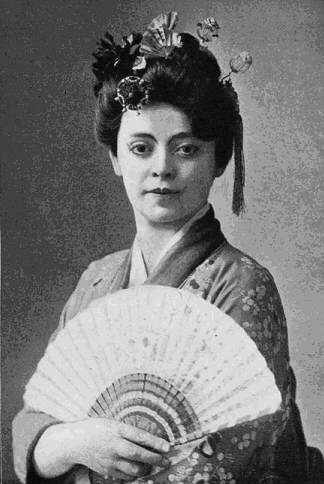
As Cho-Cho-San in David Belasco's Madame Butterfly (1900–01)

In 1892 she made her English-language debut with a stock company in San Francisco, California, as Dora Vane in Harbor Lights, a melodrama by George Robert Sims and Henry Alfred Pettitt. The following year Bergere created the part of Mrs. Russell Ritchie in The Journalist, a play first presented in Eau Claire, Wisconsin. Bergere next played ingénue parts with Maud Granger in tours of California and the Pacific Northwest. She was Blanch Livingston opposite Steve Brodie at the Fourteenth Street Theatre in the Robert Neilson Stephens 1894 play On the Bowery. In 1895 Bergere played Jen in Stephens’ A White Rat, and starred as the French adventurer Marie Vernet in On the Mississippi.

Over the season of 1897–98 Bergere was a member of the stock company affiliated with the Girard Avenue Theatre in Philadelphia, where she played Henrietta in The Two Orphans, adapted for the American stage by N. Hart Jackson and Albert Marshman Palmer from the original 1874 French play Les Deux Orphalines by Adolphe d'Ennery and Eugène Cormon; Mrs. Rawlston, in James L. Ford’s Jim the Penman; Suzanne, in The Masked Ball; adapted by Clyde Fitch from the original French by Alexandre Bisson and Fabrice Carré; Miriam, in The Butterflies; and the title role in an adaptation of Carmen. Bergere closed out the decade as a leading lady with the Dearborn Stock Company in Chicago.

At New York's Grand Opera House on November 26, 1900, Bergere played Cora, the hosiery model, in David Belasco's comedy Naughty Anthony, and the tragic Cho-Cho-San in the show's featured attraction, Madame Butterfly. The roles were originally played earlier in the year in New York and London by Blanche Bates. During this run Bergere’s popularity as Madame Butterfly was due in part to Belasco’s efforts in helping her become a more versatile actress.

Even before Madame Butterfly, she had held a long-time interest in all things Japanese and would go on to play similar roles in the future. For the season 1901–02 Bergere played leading roles with the Columbia Stock Company in Brooklyn, New York.

On September 21, 1903, at the Broad Street Theatre, Philadelphia, Pennsylvania, Bergere starred in The Red Mouse, a play in five acts adapted by H.J.W. Dam from the novel by William Hamilton Osborne.

Bergere began her long vaudeville career in 1902 with Percy G. Williams, an owner-manager who, according to Frank Cullen, author of Vaudeville Old and New, was considered the Belasco of vaudeville. During the following 17 years she produced, directed and acted in some 25 sketches and served as manager for a number of other vaudeville acts.

Bergere first toured in Billie's First Love (1902) and then subsequent in productions such as Jimmie's Experiment (1903); His Japanese Wife (1904); The Chorus Girl in The Land of Nod (1905); A Bowery Camille (1906); The Morning After the Play (1907); A Prairie Flower (1908); The Lion Tamer (1908); The Sultan's Favorite (1909); Two Women (1911); She Wanted Affection (1911); Judgment(1912); Boston Baked Beans (1913); Room 44 (1914); Locks at Panama (1915); and Little Cherry Blossom (1916). Over the remainder of her career Bergere would divide her time between vaudeville appearances and character work in cinema and on the legitimate stage.

During the season of 1928–29 Bergere was Thao in the Harry Hervey and Carleton A. Hildreth play Congai that had a run of 135 performances at the Sam H. Harris Theater. Bergere was part of the cast of Tomorrow's Harvest, which played at the 49th Street Theatre in December 1934. Her last Broadway play was Moon Over Mulberry by Nicholas Cosentino. Moon Over Mulberry, in which Bergere portrayed Lucia Morelloe, ran for 330 performances between September 1935 and May 1936 at the Lyceum Theatre and later the Mansfield Theatre. In 1937 she played Bette Davis’ maid in the film It's Love I'm After with Leslie Howard and Olivia de Havilland.

== Personal life ==
Sometime around the turn of the 20th century Bergere married Jack Farrell, a former professional baseball player turned vaudevillian. The marriage was dissolved a short time later by mutual consent. In July 1908 the press reported that Berger had married Napoleon Edward Daignault, an aspiring opera singer known on the vaudeville stage as N. Dano. The two had appeared together in A Bowery Camille. Soon after their wedding in Paris, Daignault returned to Italy to resume his musical studies.

In late September 1917 she married Herbert Warren, her long-time leading man. At the time of their marriage Warren was embarking on a new career in Hollywood as a scenario writer. Bergere and her husband were devout Christian Scientists and remained active in the church for many years.

In 1901, Bergere was reported to be the first actor to use a voice recording device as an acting aid. The paper called this technique the Bergerean Method.

== Death ==
Bergere died in Hollywood, aged 71. Her husband died two years later in Manhattan.
