= Carleton A. Hildreth =

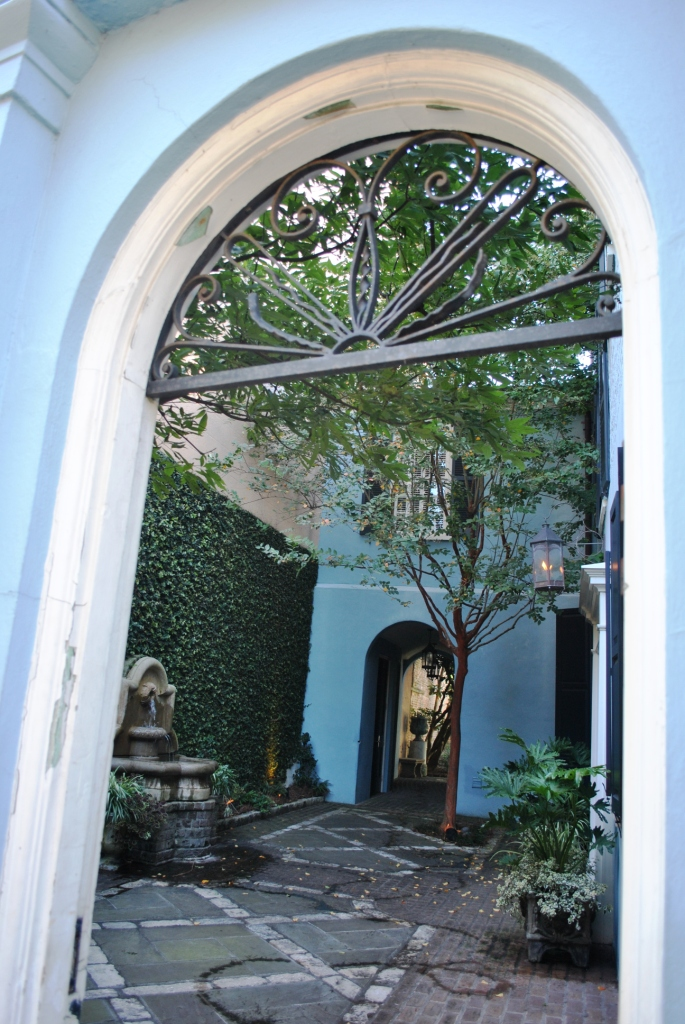
89 East Bay St., Rainbow Row House, Charleston

Carleton A. Hildreth (February 25, 1908 – March 12, 1977) was an actor, writer, researcher, and copy editor.

== Early life ==
Carleton A. Hildreth was born on February 25, 1908.

== Career ==
He was an actor, writer, researcher, and copy editor. His last employment was as proofreader for the Savannah Morning News.

After meeting Harry Hervey, Hildreth typed and researched many of his partner's novels and travel books.

Together they co-wrote plays and screenplays, like Congai (1928) (produced by Sam H. Harris with Valerie Bergere), Devil dance, a play in three acts (1927), Barracoon (1931), The Iron Widow (1931) and Black Orchid. He acted in at least one of their productions on Broadway. He also acted in We all do (1927) and Diana (1929).

After Hervey's death, Hildreth went back to work as proofreader.

== Personal life ==
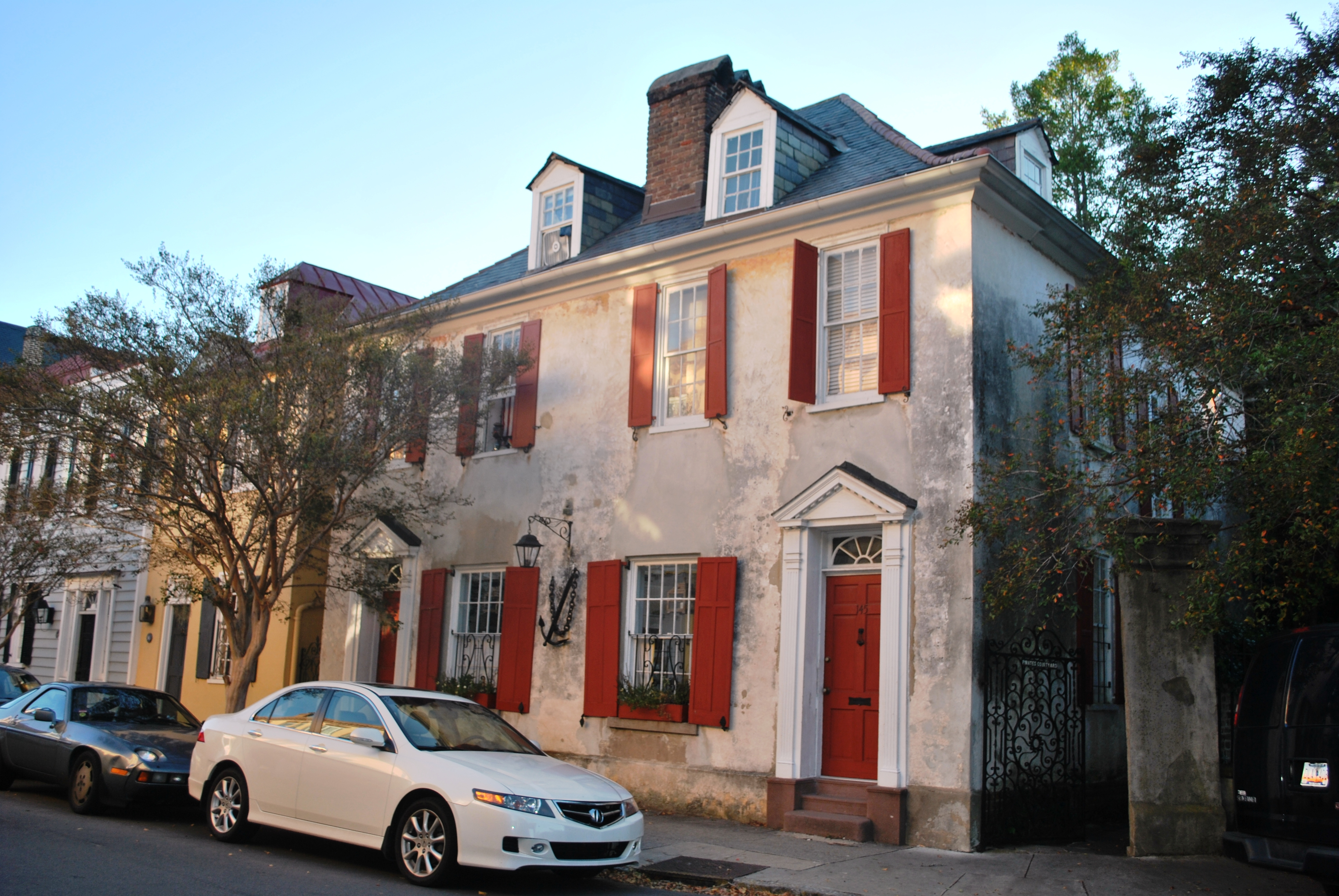
Pirate Houses, Charleston

He lived in Savannah, Georgia.

In the 1920s Hildreth met Harry Hervey (1900-1951). They remained together for almost thirty years, until Hervey's death in 1951. At the beginning of the 1920s they lived in Charleston, at 89 East Bay St., one of the Rainbow Row Houses. In the mid 1920s they traveled together in Southeast Asia and Orient. During the Great Depression they lost the Rainbow Row House and moved to the 141-145 Church Street, named "Pirate Houses". After that they moved to Hollywood, California, where Hervey worked as screenwriter.

Hildreth died on March 12, 1977, and is buried at Bonaventure Cemetery, Savannah, Georgia, alongside his mother, Mary Mclendon Hildreth. Also Hervey is buried in the same cemetery.

== Legacy ==
The Carleton Hildreth and Harry Hervey papers are hosted by the Georgia Historical Society, Savannah, Georgia.
