= National War Fund =

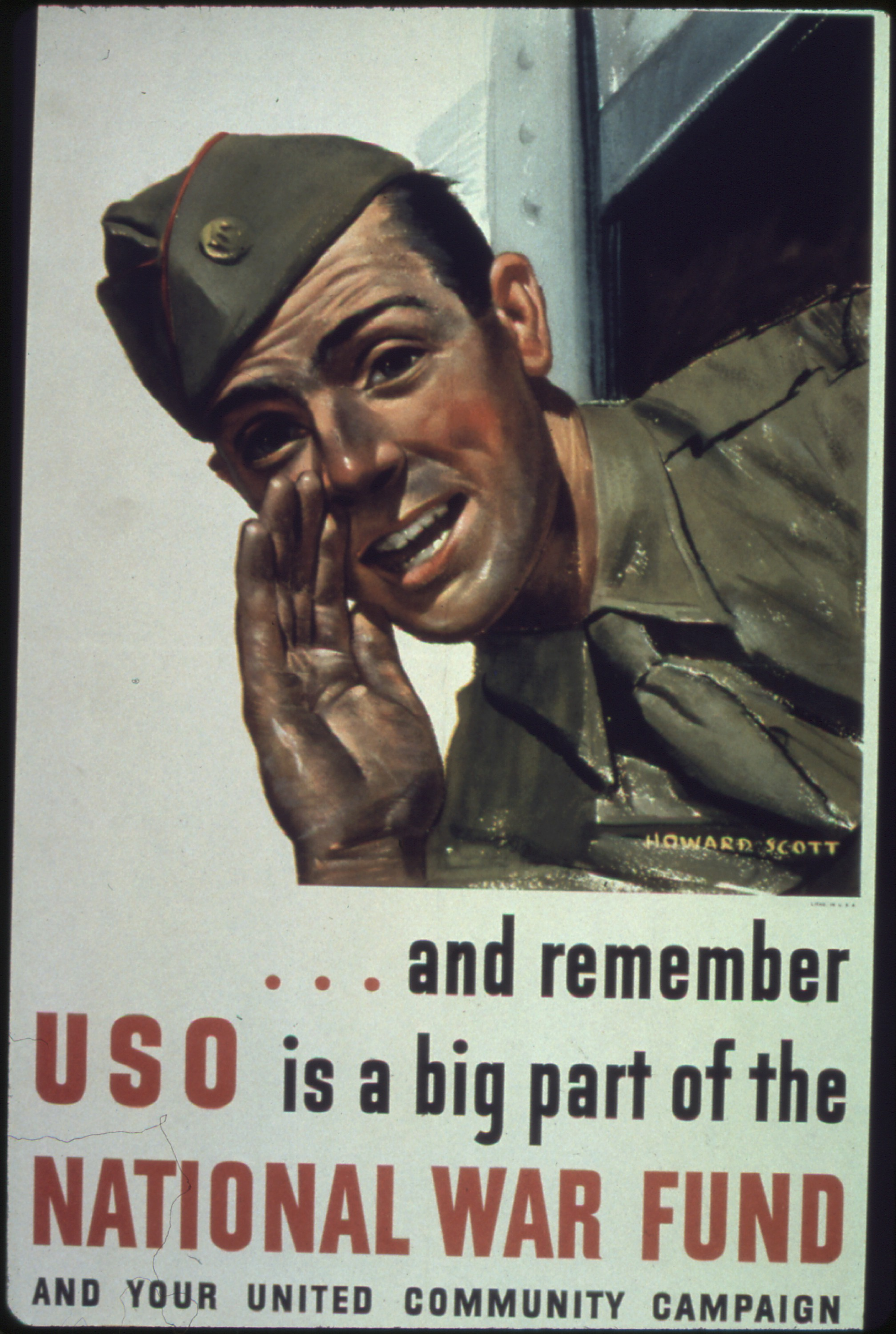

The National War Fund was the joint financing of war appeals during World War II for the United Service Organizations (USO), United Seamen's Service, and about twenty other overseas relief programs. The National War Fund operated from 1943 to 1947.

== Background ==
Beginning in September 1939 when Germany attacked Poland, 596 foreign relief agencies raised $597,621,366. On July 25, 1942, Franklin D. Roosevelt signed Executive Order 9206, moving foreign relief from the State Department to the President's War Relief Control Board.^{:3-4}

In 1942, the Community Chests and then the American Red Cross asked the American Federation of Labor and the Congress of Industrial Organizations to have common instead of independent relief campaigns.^{:97} As WWII heated up, local goals multiplied as income tax, wages, and employment surged.^{:98}

== Founding ==
The fund was started in February 1943. It was headed by Winthrop W. Aldrich, who was chairman of the board of directors at Chase National Bank and who had previously been president of the British War Relief Society. The idea of the fund came from the President's War Relief Control Board. The purpose of the fund was to help win the war^{:13} and avoid the confusion, duplication of effort, and rivalries that had occurred among foreign relief fundraising. In particular, American citizens were getting annoyed at constantly hearing requests for donations from a bewildering number of sources. The fund only admitted one agency for any given overseas country or function, and forbade member organizations from doing drives of their own.

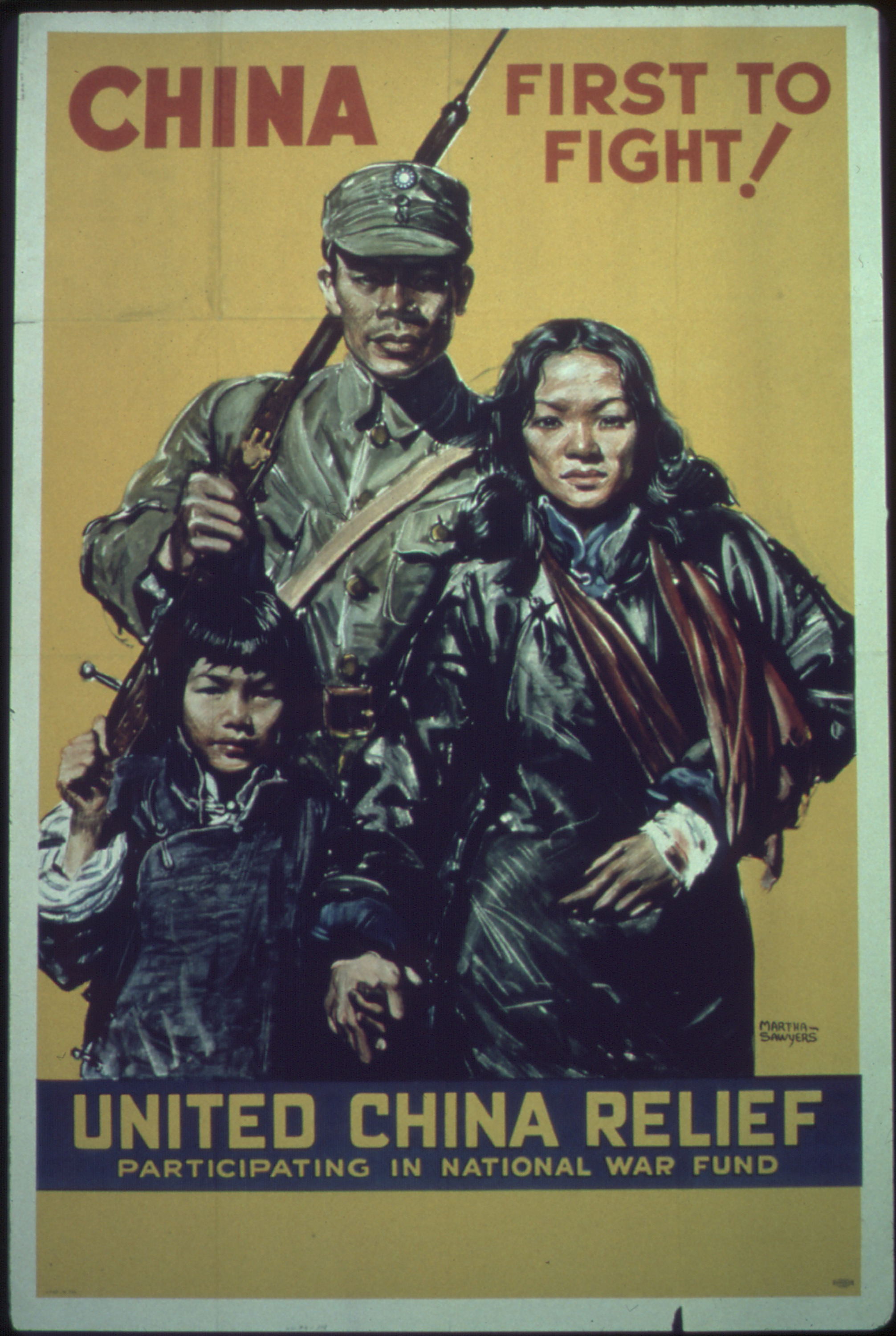

President Franklin D. Roosevelt opened the first National War Fund drive with a radio address on October 5, 1943. Roosevelt said of the new fund, "It is a philanthropic federation with three simple aims: first, to determine the nature and the extent of the war-related needs; second, to see that everybody has a chance to contribute to the funds required; and third, to channel the sums raised for its member agencies wherever American help is currently most needed—to raise enough and on time."

== Fundraising ==
Need for relief was almost unlimited with the USO alone needing at least $60 million. The initial policy was to raise as much as feasible, set at $125 million nationally.^{:17} Initial financing for the National War Fund began with a syndicated loan of $17.5 million from 76 banks, preparing bank boards in all sections of the country to champion the National War Fund.^{:27-28}

State quotas were set as a percentage of the national goal by averaging a prior Community Chest study, USO contributions, and E bond purchases.^{:105} States added at least 5% margin for losses to their quota before dividing into county and local quotas.^{:108} National War Fund subdivisions were organized in all forty-eight states, as well as in the territories of Hawaii, Alaska, Puerto Rico, the U.S. Virgin Islands, and the Panama Canal Zone.

The fund raised monies from 43,000 local communities overall, a reach that represented a significant broadening of the American philanthropic effort. In about a thousand locations, the work was done by the local Community Chest organization, with Rochester, New York, being one such instance.

The Fund resulted in an all time record for federated fund-raising.^{:64} Two different figures are seen for how much money was raised through the National War Fund. The larger, $750 million, is for the overall amount, of which more than half was Community Chest money. The amount raised for the specific war-related agencies tied to the National War Fund itself, such as the USO, the United Seaman's Service, and the foreign relief agencies, was around $325 million. Of these, the USO received the most outlays from the fund, around $175 million. Administrative, fund-raising, and publicity expenses were just 0.8%.^{:109}

Bob Hope donated royalties on his book I Never Left Home worth over $155,000, making him the largest individual contributor besides John D. Rockefeller, Jr.^{:66-67}

== Marketing ==
The most effective speakers were agency representatives recently returned from abroad.^{:43} Nearly everything that could be was localized. Leaflets left a space for naming the local community campaign.^{:41} A button, pin, or sticker showed one had given.^{:40} 32 million window stickers were produced in 1945.^{:44}

In its final year, the Fund materials on the radio made an estimated 850,780,000 listener impressions. Each year a 10 min motion picture was shown in 13,000 motion picture houses.^{:42} If the Fund publicity were run commercially it would have cost an estimated $30 million, versus a net cost of less than $1 million.^{:43-4}

== Agencies ==
Some 19 national and 12 local service organizations pooled their efforts during the war and during its immediate aftermath, when overseas relief needs were still quite pressing. Only causes that all Americans could be asked to support were included.^{:9} Agencies were only selected for inclusion with the National War Fund after being certified by the President's War Relief Control Board.^{:7} The State Department and American Red Cross examined their program and budget, checking for export licenses, duplication, and diplomatic, military, and economic clearance. Agencies negotiated federating or combining, with 13 agencies joining as the British War Relief Society.^{:8} Private money would not be spent if public funds applied.^{:14} Funds were disbursed without regard to race, creed, or political affiliation^{:9} and all agency programs and budgets were publicly available.^{:16}

The American Social Hygiene Association ran educational activities for armed forces and war workers fighting prostitution and venereal disease.^{:78-79}

Agencies provided an estimated 40,894,000 lbs food, 99,400,000 lbs clothing, and 67,216,000 lbs medical and other supplies.^{:79} Among the many supplies sent to Belgium were needle and thread, sewing machines, and shoe mending tools. Supplies to Britain included 316 ambulances and 1,000 mobile feeding kitchens.^{:80} Specialized food and medicine for malnutrition were sent to France. X-ray equipment sent to Czechoslovakia allowed the entire population to be examined for tuberculosis.^{:82} Artificial limbs and training were provided for disabled Greek veterans.^{:83} Thousands of Norwegian prisoners of war in Germany got shoes.^{:85} 5,000 volunteer sewing groups remade a million garments for the Philippine climate.^{:86} Russian War Relief sent a vast quantity of household items, contributing to Allied victory and fostering understanding between the countries’ peoples by using friendly nonpolitical aid.^{:88}

== Liquidation ==
While most agencies foresaw operations continuing in 1947 and beyond, Community Chests agreed conducting a war appeal in 1946 would not be feasible.^{:112} The National War Fund ended at the start of 1947, with the constituent organizations going their own ways. At the end of that year, a history of the fund was published by its general manager, Harold J. Seymour. The fund was formally liquidated in April 1948.

The fund has generally been considered to have been successful in fulfilling its aims. Scholar Merle Curti wrote, "The story of the National War Fund is important in American philanthropy."

Total Agency Disbursements^{:70-71}
Belgian War Relief Society	$2,219,299.63
British War Relief Society	$5,944,033.18
Bundles for Britain	$108,775.19
Catholic Welfare Conference, National	$10,963,666.42
China, United Service to	$32,534,140.86
Czechoslovakia, American Relief for	$2,254,706.98
Denmark Relief, America	$254,457.28
European Children, U.S. Committee for the Care of	$373,705.20
Field Service, American	$680,191.97
France, American Aid to	$6,718,153.95
Greek War Relief Association	$8,172,181.96
Holland, American Relief for	$3,637,699.03
Italy, American Relief for	$5,692,309.50
Lithuanian Relief Fund, United	$812,870.88
Luxembourg, Friends of	$300,507.07
Near East Foundation	$814,101.34
Norway, American Relief for	$2,527,637.95
Philippine War Relief	$1,584,694.62
Poland, American Relief for	$6,880,382.81
Prisoners Aid Committee, YMCA, War	$9,749,162.42
Prisoners Aid, Inc., War	$12,794.65
Refugee Relief Trustees	$4,980,629.11
Russian War Relief	$16,028,952.67
Seamen’s Service, United	$12,755,477.65
Social Hygiene Association, American	$948,529.43
World Emergency & War Victims Fund, YWCA	$1,661,973.11
World Student Service Fund	$240,163.04
Yugoslav Relief Fund, United	$3,158,317.73
Total agencies w/o USO	$142,009,515.63
USO	$175,575,959.24
Total agencies	$317,585,474.87
Headquarters and Campaign Expense	$2,142,867.07
Expense of Labor Campaign Committees	$1,145,737.10
Liquidation Expense and Contingencies	$528,121.00
Total	$321,402,200.04
