= Sun Meiyao =

Chinese bandit leader

Sun Meiyao (simplified Chinese: 孙美瑶; traditional Chinese: 孫美瑤; pinyin: Sūn Měiyáo; 1898 - 19 December 1923) leader of the Shandong Autonomous Army (山東自治軍: pinyin; Shāndōng zìzhì jūn), also known as the Shandong Outlaws (山東響馬), a group of bandits operating in Jiangsu, Anhui, and Shandong provinces in the early 1920s. He is most famous for leading his bandits in the seizure and robbery of the "Blue Express" train near the town of Lincheng on 6 May 1923, and taking over 300 hostages, including 30 westerners. The incident, which became known as the Lincheng Outrage, embarrassed China's fragile republican government, forcing it to respond to demands of western governments that it increase security along the country's extensive rail network and pay compensation and indemnities to western hostages.

== Early life ==
Sun Meiyao was born in 1898 in Zaozhuang, Shandong province to a well off family. On 15 July 1922 he inherited the leadership of the Shandong Autonomous Army after his older brother Sun Meizhu (1883-1922) was captured in combat with government troops and shot. Sun Meizhu, a renowned scholar in the Shandong area, founded the group in 1920 to protect against constant persecution from warlord generals and China's central government as well as the general lawlessness that prevailed at the time. The army was one of many such bandit groups made up of itinerant discharged and expelled soldiers, in this case mostly former soldiers under Zhang Jingyao, that operated in areas outside of the control of China's central republican government. They supported themselves by plundering the local countryside, robbery, and hostage taking. Explaining his motives Sun said "...we have hitherto been law abiding citizens, and that we have no desire to become robbers; but in this troubled era of unreliable government we find ourselves compelled to take risks in order to obtain redress for our grievances"

== Lincheng Outrage ==
In the early hours of 6 May 1923, Sun's twelve hundred bandits attacked and then derailed the "Blue Express" near the town of Lincheng (Xuecheng) on the Tianjin-Pukou Railway in Hebei Province close to the Jiangsu-Shandong border. The bandits looted the train and killed a number of Chinese passengers as well as a British subject, Joseph Rothman after he refused to surrender his valuables. They took 300 passengers hostage, including 30 westerners, most of whom were Americans, but also included British, French, Italian, German, and Danish nationals, and forced them on a 10-day march to their mountain base at Baodugu. Some of the more prominent hostages included Lucy Aldrich, eldest daughter of U.S. Senator Nelson W. Aldrich of Rhode Island and sister-in-law of John D. Rockefeller Jr. J. B. Powell, editor of China Weekly Review, and Commodore Guiseppe Musso, a wealthy and influential Italian who was the chief attorney in the Shanghai French Concession.

Sun led negotiations with intermediaries that included he U.S. Minister to China Dr. Jacob Gould Schurman and American China hand Roy Scott Anderson. Sun's demand included the removal of government troops from Shandong, an official pardon for the kidnappers, reinstatement or enrollment into the army for those among the bandits who wished it, and guarantees by six foreign powers that the demands would be met. As a gesture of good faith, the women were released within a couple of days of the kidnapping, while the remaining male hostages were held for over a month as negotiations dragged on. Ultimately the Shanghai Green Gang leader Du Yuesheng secured the release of the remaining hostages on June 12, 1923 with an $85,000 ransom along with the Chinese government's agreement to accept bandits who wanted it into the military. Many bandits understood the dangers of joining the military and declined. Sun Meiyao and other leaders even received military commissions.

== Death ==
Over the next six months, the bandits who were inducted into the military were refused weapons and pay, and encouraged to live off the surrounding countryside. Most were killed before the end of the year. Sun was executed six months later on December 19, 1923 at the Zhongxing coal mine by General Zhang Peiyuan, on orders of the new Shandong governor Zheng Shiqi, who had accused Sun of failing to turn over guns and ammunition captured from bandits and of illicitly communicating with the bandit Lao Yangren with the intention of returning to banditry.
