= Richard S. Aldrich =

American politician (1884–1941)

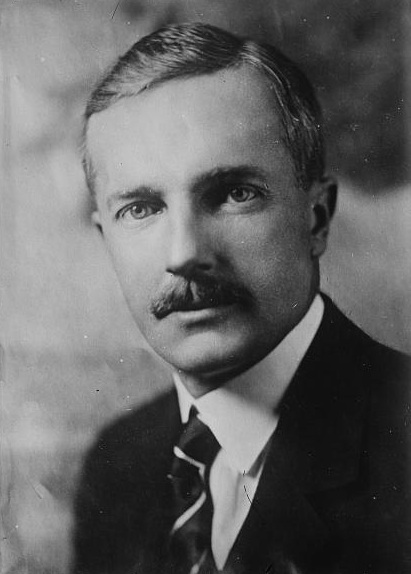

Member of the U.S. House of Representatives from Rhode Island's 2nd district
- In office March 4, 1923 – March 3, 1933
- Preceded by: Walter Russell Stiness
- Succeeded by: John Matthew O'Connell

Member of the Rhode Island Senate
- In office 1916–1918

Member of the Rhode Island House of Representatives
- In office 1914–1916

Personal details
- Born: Richard Steere Aldrich; February 29, 1884 Washington, D.C., U.S.
- Died: December 25, 1941 (aged 57) Providence, Rhode Island, U.S.
- Resting place: Swan Point Cemetery; Providence, Rhode Island
- Party: Republican
- Spouse: Janet Innis White
- Children: 1
- Parents: Nelson W. Aldrich; Abby Pearce Chapman
- Relatives: Lucy Aldrich (sister); Abby Aldrich Rockefeller (sister); Winthrop W. Aldrich (brother)
- Education: Yale; Harvard Law School
- Occupation: Attorney, politician

Richard Steere Aldrich (February 29, 1884 – December 25, 1941) was an American politician. He was a Republican member of the U.S. House of Representatives, and served in the Rhode Island State Senate and the Rhode Island House of Representatives.

== Early life and education ==
Aldrich was born in Washington, D.C., where his father, Nelson W. Aldrich, was serving in Congress. He was raised in Providence, Rhode Island and attended the public schools. He graduated from Hope Street High School in Providence in 1902, from Yale University in 1906, and from Harvard Law School in 1909.

In 1911, he was admitted to the bar and began the practice of law in New York City. He returned to Providence in 1913, and continued practicing law.

== Political career ==
He moved to Warwick, Rhode Island and became involved in politics and was a member of the Rhode Island House of Representatives from 1914 to 1916, and served in the Rhode Island Senate from 1916 to 1918. In July 1923 he became a member of the Rhode Island Society of the Sons of the American Revolution.

Aldrich was elected as a Republican candidate to the Sixty-eighth Congress and to the four succeeding Congresses, serving from March 4, 1923, to March 3, 1933. He was not a candidate for renomination in 1932. While in Congress, he spoke out against the Immigration Act of 1924, that limited the annual number of immigrants who could be admitted from any country.

After leaving Congress, he resumed his legal career in Providence until his death there on December 25, 1941. He is interred in Swan Point Cemetery in Providence.

== Family prominence ==
Aldrich was born into a family descended from John Winthrop, William Wickenden, Roger Williams and John Steere.

He was the son of Nelson W. Aldrich and Abby Pearce Chapman. His father was a leader of the Republican Party in the Senate, where he served from 1881 to 1911.

His sister Abigail Greene "Abby" Aldrich was a philanthropist who married financer and philanthropist John Davison Rockefeller Jr., and their second son Nelson Aldrich Rockefeller was a four-term Governor of New York who campaigned for the Republican presidential nomination in 1960, 1964, and 1968, and was named Vice President of the United States under President Gerald Ford by the Congress in 1974.

His brother was Winthrop Williams Aldrich, who served as chairman of the Chase National Bank. His nephew David Rockefeller would eventually become the chairman.

== Personal life ==
Aldrich married Janet Innis White on April 30, 1921. Their son was also named Richard Steere Aldrich.

U.S. House of Representatives
Preceded by Walter Russell Stiness	Member of the U.S. House of Representatives from Rhode Island's 2nd congressional district 1923–1933	Succeeded by John Matthew O'Connell
