= Shanghai Express (film) =

1932 American film

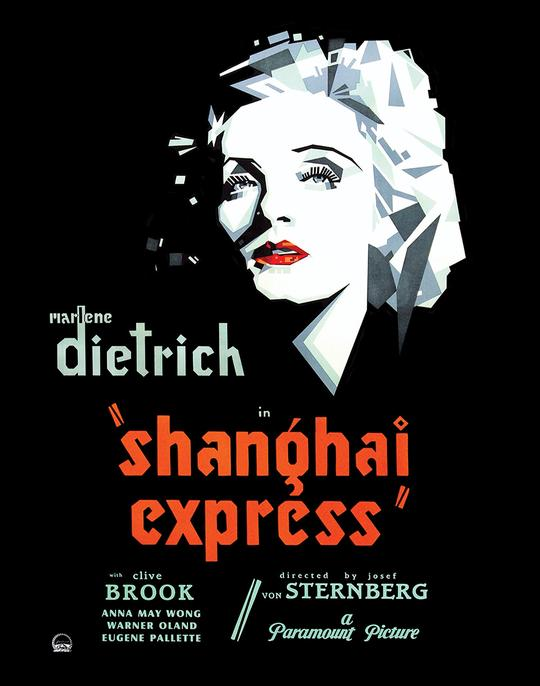
- Original theatrical poster
- Directed by: Josef von Sternberg
- Screenplay by: Jules Furthman
- Based on: "Sky Over China" (also known as "China Pass") by Harry Hervey
- Produced by: Adolph Zukor
- Starring: Marlene Dietrich; Clive Brook; Anna May Wong; Warner Oland
- Cinematography: Lee Garmes
- Edited by: Frank Sullivan
- Music by: W. Franke Harling; Rudolph G. Kopp
- Distributed by: Paramount Pictures
- Release date: February 12, 1932
- Running time: 80 minutes
- Country: United States
- Language: English
- Box office: $1.5 million (worldwide rentals)

Shanghai Express is a 1932 American pre-Code film about a group of train passengers held hostage by a warlord during the Chinese Civil War. It was directed by Josef von Sternberg and stars Marlene Dietrich, Clive Brook, Anna May Wong and Warner Oland. The screenplay was written by Jules Furthman based on a 1931 short story by Harry Hervey. Shanghai Express was the fourth of seven films that Sternberg and Dietrich created together.

The film was released during the midst of the Great Depression. It was remade as Night Plane from Chungking (1943) and Peking Express (1951).

== Plot ==
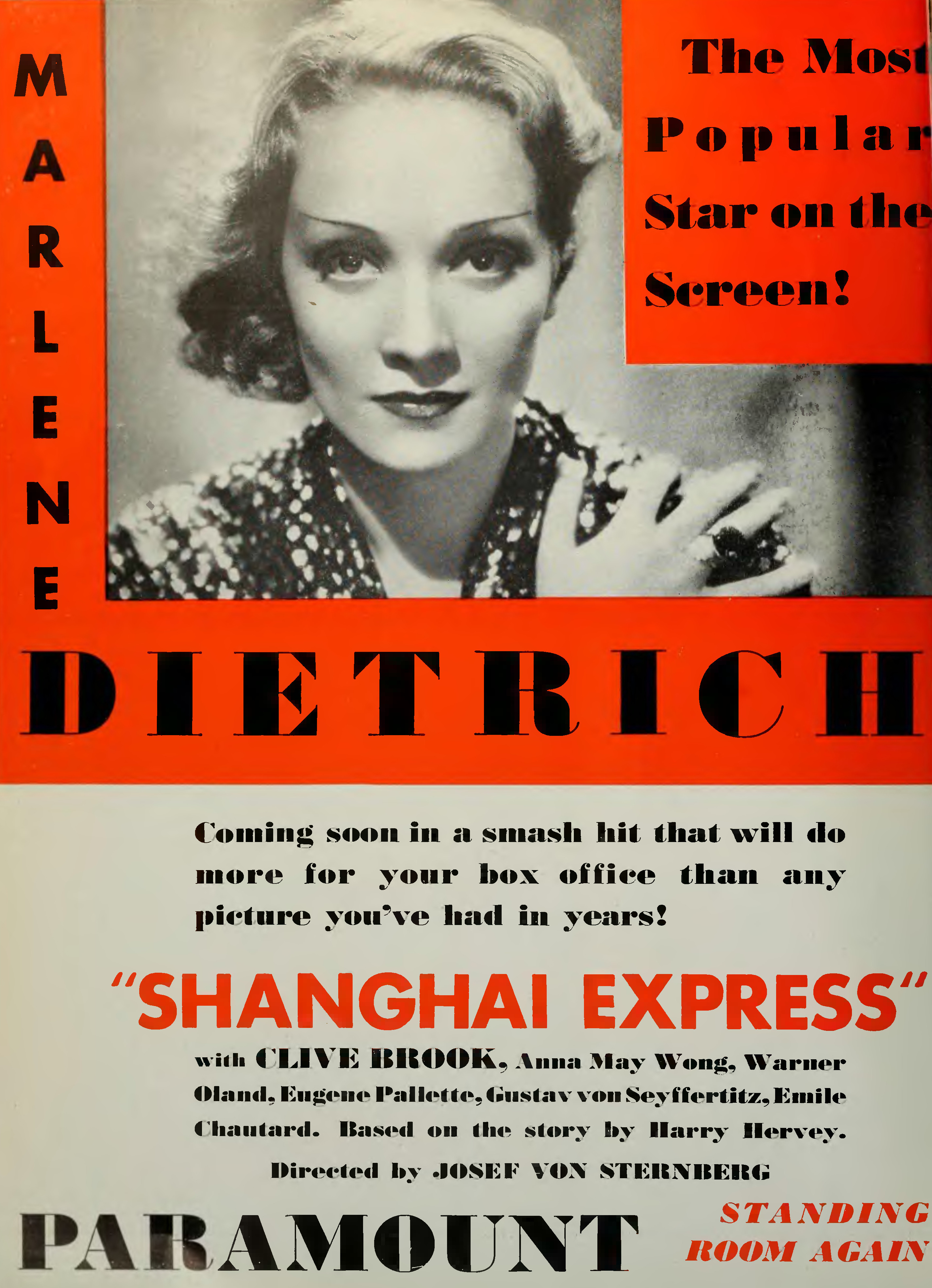
Shanghai Express ad in The Film Daily, 1932

In 1931, China is embroiled in a civil war. Friends of British captain Donald "Doc" Harvey envy him because Shanghai Lily is traveling on the express train he is taking from Peking to Shanghai. They tell him she is a "coaster", a "woman who lives by her wits along the China coast" (i.e., a prostitute). Lily is in fact his former lover Madeline. Five years earlier, she had played a trick on him to gauge his love for her, but it backfired and he left her. She informs him, "It took more than one man to change my name to Shanghai Lily." Lily still loves him, and she notices that he still wears a watch with her photograph in it.

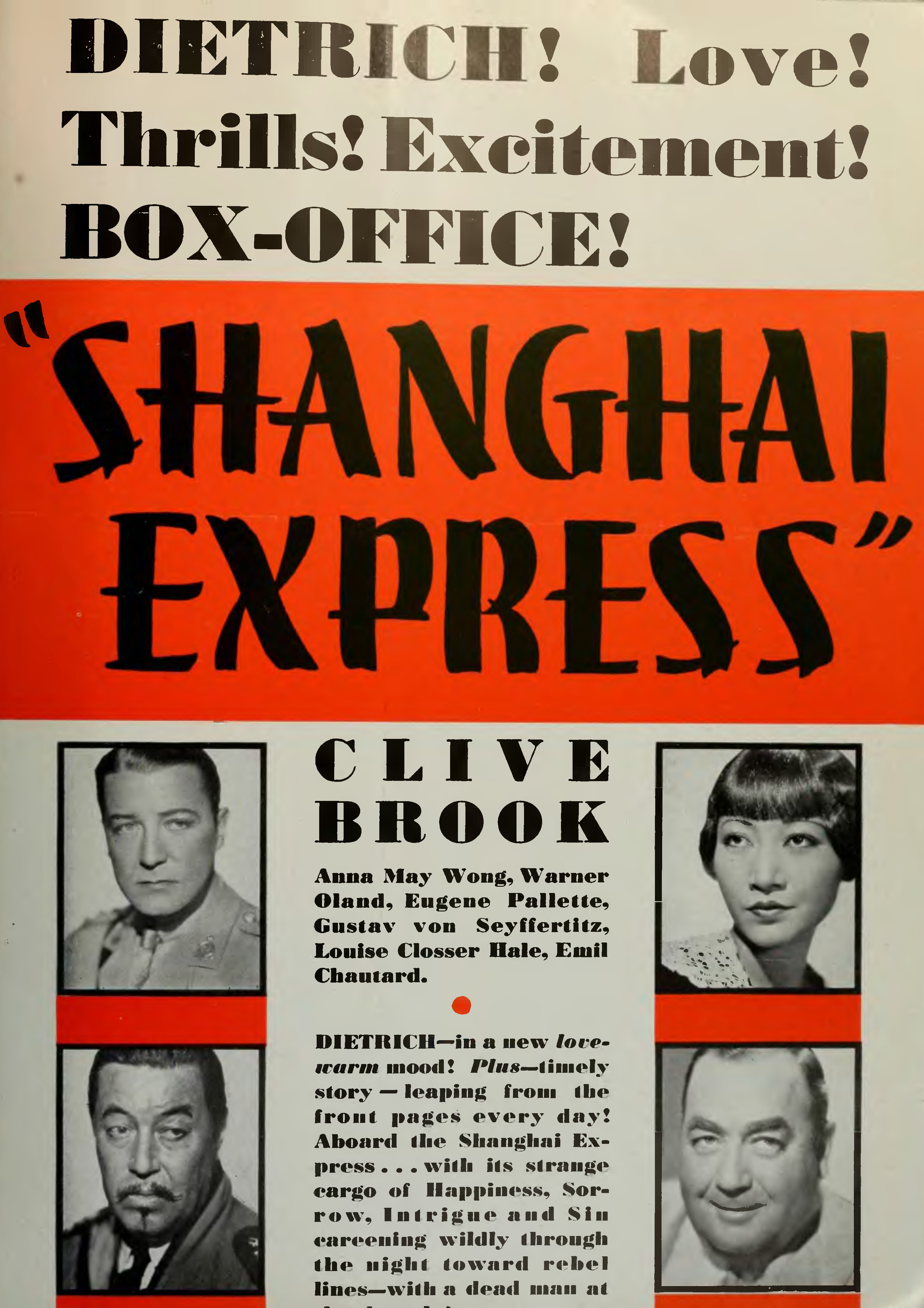
Shanghai Express ad in The Film Daily, 1932

Among the other passengers in first class are fellow coaster Hui Fei, Christian missionary Mr. Carmichael (who calls the coasters "fallen women"), gambler Sam Salt, opium dealer Eric Baum, boarding-house keeper Mrs. Haggerty, French officer Major Lenard, and a mysterious Eurasian, Henry Chang.

At a scheduled stop, Chinese government soldiers empty the train to check passports and apprehend a high-ranking rebel agent. Chang sends a message at the telegraph office. Later, the train is stopped and commandeered by the rebel army and its powerful warlord, who turns out to be Chang. He tortures Baum for insulting him on the train. He starts questioning the other first-class passengers, looking for someone important enough to keep as a hostage in exchange for his aide. Harvey, traveling to perform brain surgery on the governor-general of Shanghai, becomes the hostage.

Waiting for his aide to arrive, Chang offers to take Lily to his palace. She declines, claiming she has reformed. Harvey breaks in and knocks Chang down. Because he needs Harvey alive, Chang does not retaliate at that point. He has Hui Fei brought to his quarters, where he rapes her. Lily is taken back to the train and stays up praying for Harvey.

When Chang's man arrives, Chang tells Lily he plans to blind Harvey in revenge. She tells Chang she will go to his palace with him. Harvey is released unharmed, unaware he was to be blinded at the hands of Chang.

Hui Fei sneaks back into Chang's quarters and stabs him to death as he is packing to leave. She tells Harvey to rescue Lily, which he does. Carmichael, realizing he was wrong to condemn Lily, coaxes Lily to reveal the truth about how she had saved Harvey. She insists that he not tell Harvey and he agrees, telling Harvey that he knows Lily is a good person.

The train reaches Shanghai, and the passengers disperse. Harvey finds Lily while she is buying him a new watch, and asks her to forgive him for his lack of faith. They kiss amidst the bustle of the train station.

== Cast ==
- Marlene Dietrich as Shanghai Lily / Madeline
- Clive Brook as Captain Donald "Doc" Harvey
- Anna May Wong as Hui Fei
- Warner Oland as Henry Chang
- Lawrence Grant as Reverend Carmichael
- Eugene Pallette as Sam Salt
- Gustav von Seyffertitz as Eric Baum
- Louise Closser Hale as Mrs. Haggerty
- Émile Chautard as Major Lenard

== Production ==
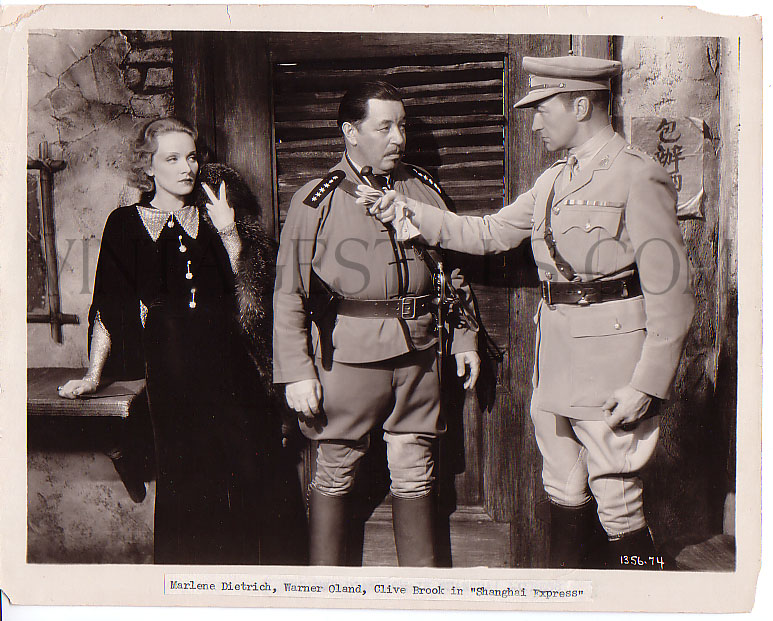
L to R: Marlene Dietrich, Warner Oland, Clive Brook

Shanghai Express is based on Henry Hervey's story "Sky Over China" (also known as "China Pass"), which was loosely based on the Lincheng Incident that occurred on May 6, 1923, in which a Shandong warlord captured the Shanghai-to-Beijing express train and took 25 Westerners, including Lucy Aldrich, and 300 Chinese people hostage. All of the hostages were successfully ransomed.

The story also echoes elements of Guy de Maupassant's short story "Boule de Suif" in that it consists of travelers stopped in a country at war and a woman is forced into intimate relations with the commander in charge. However, the denouement differs; in Maupassant's story, the woman does not murder the commander.

Paramount studio heads were concerned that the Hays Office kept a close watch on the film for its portrayal of Reverend Carmichael and the depiction of the 1911 Revolution.

Although set in China, few Chinese actors appear in the film. However, Anna May Wong, who was American-born Chinese, has a major role, and many Chinese extras are used in the film.

Shanghai Express film was in production from August to November 1931 and was released the following year.

== Reception ==
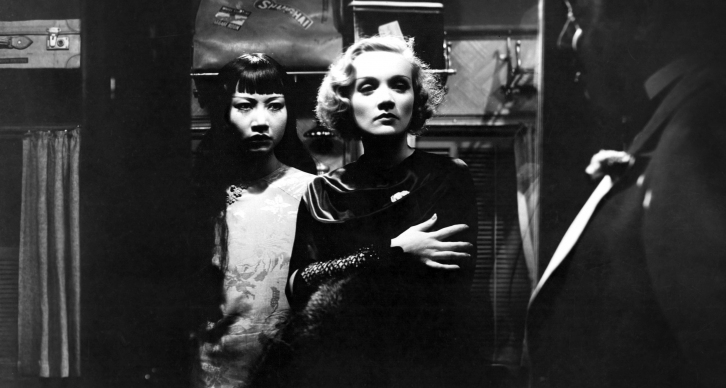
L to R: Anna May Wong, Marlene Dietrich, Warner Oland

The film was praised by Mordaunt Hall of The New York Times as a star vehicle for Marlene Dietrich: "Miss Dietrich gives an impressive performance. She is languorous but fearless as Lily." He also singled out other characters: "Clive Brooks's performance is also noteworthy...Warner Oland is excellent as Mr. Chang and Anna May Wong makes the most of the role of the brave Chinese girl. Eugene Pallette serves splendidly as Sam Salt."

Jonathan Spence, writing about the film's usefulness as a piece of history, feels that the real 1923 Lincheng Incident was far more dramatic, but says that Shanghai Express is nonetheless "a wonderful film, with great performances by Dietrich ... and Anna May Wong."

The critic for Senses of Cinema called Shanghai Express a "riotous exercise in excess in every area; the visuals are overpowering and sumptuous; the costumes ornate and extravagant; the sets a riot of fabrics, light and space; and all of it captured in the most delectable black-and-white cinematography that one can find anywhere." He discusses the film's interest in the questions of race and colonialism and notes the "peculiar bifurcation" of the film's view of race, as most of the respectable "white" characters in the film are seen as both flawed and racist. He says only the characters played by Dietrich, Wong, and Brook have "real moral agency." He calls the film "surprisingly feminist," with Dietrich being a "strong, dominating presence" and Wong's character her equal.

Shanghai Express is memorable for its stylistic black-and-white chiaroscuro cinematography. Even though Lee Garmes was awarded the Academy Award for Best Cinematography, according to Dietrich, it was von Sternberg who was responsible for most of it.

The film was a box office success grossing $827,000 in rentals the US and Canada and $1.5 million altogether in worldwide rentals. Rotten Tomatoes gives the film a rating of 96% from 67 reviews.

The February 2020 issue of New York Magazine lists Shanghai Express as among "The Best Movies That Lost Best Picture at the Oscars."

== Awards and honors ==
Award	Category	Nominee	Outcome
5th Academy Awards (Academy of Motion Picture Arts and Sciences)	Best Picture	Shanghai Express; Winner was Grand Hotel	Nominated
5th Academy Awards (Academy of Motion Picture Arts and Sciences)	Best Director	Josef von Sternberg; Winner was Frank Borzage – Bad Girl	Nominated
5th Academy Awards (Academy of Motion Picture Arts and Sciences)	Best Cinematography	Lee Garmes	Won

== Legacy ==
Lucile Hadžihalilović said that Marlene Dietrich's character in Shanghai Express was the spark behind the character Cristina (portrayed by Marion Cotillard) in her 2025 fantasy drama film The Ice Tower. "Her elegance, her mystery—it's all there. And von Sternberg's fetishistic attention to mise-en-scène left an impression on me", she said.
