= Tang Zaili =

General Tang Zaili
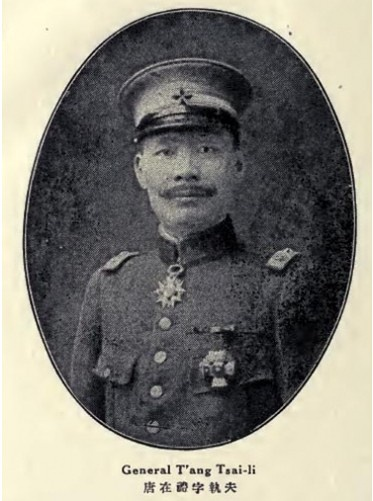
- Tang Zaili in 1925
- Native name: 唐在礼
- Born: 1882; Shanghai, China
- Died: 1964 (aged 81–82) Shanghai, China
- Allegiance: Qing dynasty, Republic of China
- Service years: 1901–1928

Tang Zaili (Chinese: 唐在礼; Wade–Giles: T'ang Tsai-li; 1882–1964), courtesy name Zhifu (挚夫 or 执夫), was a Chinese civil servant and prominent military figure in the Qing dynasty and later the Republic of China. He was Military Counselor to Yuan Shikai, President of the Republic of China, and later served as China's Chief Military Delegate at the Paris Peace Accords in 1919.

== Early life ==
Tang was born in 1882 in Shanghai. After passing competitive exams conducted by the Shanghai School of Languages in 1898 and was sent to Japan as a government student, becoming in October 1901 among the first group of Chinese students to attend the Imperial Japanese Army Academy. There he studied applied artillery and engineering and graduated in 1904.

He returned to China to serve as staff officer at the Training Bureau under Yuan Shikai who was then Viceroy of Beiyang. He then married Shen Youqing, principle of the Beijing Chongshi Girls' School.

== Military career ==
Tang was appointed commander of the artillery regiment of the Fifth Division stationed in Shandong in 1906. Two years later he became chief of the department of the Training Bureau of the Metropolitan Forces. In the same year he was commissioned Lieutenant-Colonel of the artillery, chief staff officer of the maneuvers at Zhuozhou, Zhili and inspected the National Maneuvers of Japan.

In 1910 he was dispatched to Urga (present day Ulaanbaatar), Mongolia as the chief of the military staff to train recruits for the Mongolian army. He was particularly disliked by the local population because of his aggressive tactics in recruiting and training a sinicized military. Recalled to Beijing within a year after complaints from local Mongol officials, he then became the staff officer of Yuan Shikai and upon the establishment of the Republic of China in 1912, Yuan Shikai sent him as one of the Northern Delegates to negotiate with the Nanjing government to effect the unification of the North and the South.

Starting in 1914, Tang rose through the ranks of the president's council, becoming Chief of the General Staff in December 1915 and then Military Counselor to President Yuan in July 1916. He was promoted as a Brigadier-General and awarded the Fourth Order of Merit.

== Paris Peace Conference ==
In 1918 Tang was sent to Europe as the Chinese representative at the Allied Military Council. During the first part of 1919 he was Chief Military representative on the Chinese Delegation to the Paris Peace Conference. Following the conference he traveled extensively through Europe, visiting the Balkans as well as Central and Southern Europe.

Tang returned to China in the summer of 1920 and was made a Jiangjun (General) of the College of Marshals. In 1922 he was appointed a Member of the Commission on Mongolian Affairs.

== Railway Guards ==
In 1923 Tang was appointed director-general of the Railway Guards, the railway security service established following the Lincheng Incident of 1923 in which a Shandong warlord captured the Shanghai to Beijing express train and held 25 westerners and 300 Chinese hostage. He resigned his position in 1928.

In 1960, Tang became the librarian in Shanghai Museum of History and Culture. He died in Shanghai in 1964.
