= Peking Express (film) =

1951 film

- Theatrical release poster
- Directed by: William Dieterle
- Written by: John Meredyth Lucas; Jules Furthman; Harry Hervey
- Produced by: Hal B. Wallis
- Starring: Joseph Cotten; Corinne Calvet; Edmund Gwenn; Marvin Miller
- Cinematography: Charles Lang
- Edited by: Stanley E. Johnson
- Music by: Dimitri Tiomkin
- Production company: Paramount Pictures
- Distributed by: Paramount Pictures
- Release date: July 18, 1951 (New York)
- Running time: 85 minutes
- Country: United States
- Language: English
- Box office: $1.1 million (U.S. rentals)

Peking Express is a 1951 American action adventure film produced and released by Paramount Pictures. It is the second remake of Paramount's earlier Shanghai Express (1932), following Night Plane from Chungking (1943), and the first film to be set in Red China. It was directed by William Dieterle and produced by Hal B. Wallis from a screenplay by John Meredyth Lucas that is based on the original screenplay by Jules Furthman and Harry Hervey. The film stars Joseph Cotten, Corinne Calvet, Edmund Gwenn and Marvin Miller.

The music score was composed by Dimitri Tiomkin, the cinematographer was Charles Lang, the art directors were Franz Bachelin and Hal Pereira and the costume designer was Edith Head.

== Plot ==
Doctor Michael Bachlin is in Shanghai investigating a missing shipment of medical supplies for the World Health Organization. He travels to Peking on a train with other passengers such as Father Joseph Murray and Kwon a mysterious businessman. Just before the train leaves, Kwon's son Ti Shen attempts to board, but his mother Li Eiu has him arrested by nationalist agents before boarding the train herself.

Another passenger is nightclub singer and Michael's former lover Danielle Grenier, whom he had met in Paris. Kwon invites Danielle and Michael to the dining car. Father Murray argues with a reporter named Wong, an ardent communist who also clashes with Michael. Danielle tells Michael that after their relationship, she married, but her husband died a year later.

Li Eiu, who shares Danielle's compartment, is found beaten by her husband. The next day, when the train stops to collect soldiers, Kwon passes a message to a vendor. Michael wants to resume their romance but Danielle hesitates, saying that she has been involved with too many others. Li Eiu is discovered with a knife wound, although Kwon claims that she attempted suicide, but Michael is suspicious.

Forced to stop by a blocked rail line, the train is attacked by counterrevolutionary forces and the soldiers on board surrender but are shot. Kwon, the attackers' leader, has the passengers driven to a farmhouse. Kwon, once a communist, now deals in the black market, including stealing precious medical supplies that Michael is trying to recover. Kwon knows that Michael is going to Peking to treat a high-ranking general. Kwon forces Michael to contact Peking offering to release the train and its passengers in exchange for his son's freedom.

Michael arranges for Kwon's son to be flown to the farm hideout. Danielle confesses to Michael that she was a spy and that her late husband was a communist. The arrangement for the release of the hostage and train is dependent on Peking bringing Ti Shen without the aircraft being following to Kwon's base. When Wong confronts Kwon about his treachery, he is tortured, his hands burned with a poker. After Ti Shen arrives, the pilot radios Peking that he will leave at dawn with Michael, but Kwon shoots and kills the pilot, reneging on the deal.

Michael treats Wong's wounds and tells Ti Shen that his father has tried to kill his mother, who has been frightened by her husband's actions and his influence over Ti Shen. Kwon wants Danielle for himself, sending Michael and Father Murray back to the train. Li Eiu confronts her husband, stabbing Kwon, and begs her son to help Michael and the others escape and then dies.

Under guard by Father Murray, Michael brings Ti Shen along and tries to find Danielle, who has already returned to the farmhouse. Michael binds Ti Shen and returns to Kwon's base, shooting two guards and taking Danielle away. At the train, Wong joins two soldiers in a jeep and throws a hand grenade, which wounds Father Murray. Michael returns fire with a machine gun, killing the attackers.

As the train gathers speed, more soldiers are in pursuit, but Ti Shen helps Michael by firing at the soldiers, but he is shot. As he dies, he reveals the location of the stolen medicine.

== Cast ==
- Joseph Cotten as Michael Bachlin
- Corinne Calvet as Danielle Grenier
- Edmund Gwenn as Father Joseph Murray
- Marvin Miller as Kwon
- Benson Fong as Wong
- Soo Yong as Li Eiu
- Robert W. Lee as Ti Shen
- Gregory Gay as Stanislaus
- Victor Sen Yung as Chinese captain
- Harold Fong as Ticket clerk
- Peter Chong as Restaurant car steward
- Eddie Lee as Chinese policeman
- Beal Wong as Chinese pilot
- Leon M. Lontok as Chinese boatman
- Lane Nakano as Driver of jeep
- George T. Lee as Soldier
- Walter Ng as Soldier
- Wing Foo as Soldier
- Alfredo Santos as Guard
- Wei Fan Hsueh as Officer assistant to Kwon
- James B. Leong as Train conductor
- Jung Lim as Train porter
- Rollin Moriyama as Chinese priest
- Si Lan Chen as Old woman
- Gregory Merims as Russian plainclothesman
- William Yip as Chinese nationalist
- Hom Wing Gim as Chinese mess boy
- Weaver Levy as Chinese officer

== Production ==
Peking Express, is the second remake of Paramount's earlier Shanghai Express (1932), following Night Plane from Chungking (1943). Script writer Jules Furthman worked on both Peking Express and Shanghai Express. The film the first Hollywood feature set in communist China.

Charlton Heston was originally announced as the film's leading man in December 1950, but Joseph Cotten replaced him one month later.

Principal photography took place from late February to late March 1951.

== Reception ==
In a contemporary review for The New York Times, critic A. H. Weiler wrote: "The melodrama in 'Peking Express' is simple, stark and familiar—perhaps too familiar, since 'Peking Express' seems to be making practically the same stops as 'Shanghai Express' did some years back. The politics of ''Peking Express' are another matter. You can't tell the ideologies without a scorecard."

Facing protests from the Chinese embassy in New Delhi, the Indian government banned the film in 1952, declaring it "likely to wound the susceptibilities of the people of China".
