= Lucy Aldrich =

Eldest daughter of U.S. Senator Nelson W. Aldrich

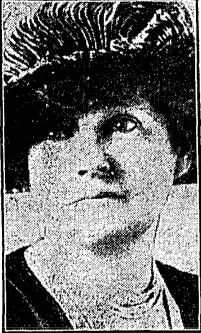
- Aldrich in 1923
- Born: Lucy Truman Aldrich; October 23, 1869; Providence, Rhode Island, U.S.
- Died: January 12, 1955 (aged 85); Providence, Rhode Island, U.S.
- Education: Miss Porter's School
- Parent(s): Nelson W. Aldrich; Abigail Pearce Truman Chapman
- Relatives: Abby Aldrich Rockefeller (sister); Winthrop W. Aldrich (brother); Richard S. Aldrich (brother)

Lucy Truman Aldrich (October 23, 1869 – January 12, 1955) was an American philanthropist and art collector who was the eldest daughter of U.S. Senator Nelson W. Aldrich of Rhode Island.

== Biography ==
Lucy was born in Providence, Rhode Island on October 23, 1869. She was the oldest surviving of eleven children born to U.S. Senator Nelson Wilmarth Aldrich and Abigail Pearce Truman "Abby" Chapman. Her sister, philanthropist Abigail Greene "Abby" Aldrich, was married to financer and philanthropist John Davison Rockefeller Jr. who was the only son of Standard Oil co-founder John D. Rockefeller. Her brother Winthrop W. Aldrich served as the U.S. Ambassador to the United Kingdom under President Dwight D. Eisenhower.

Lucy, who never married and was congenitally deaf, was educated privately by governesses and later at Miss Porter's School in Farmington, Connecticut. She lived in the family home at 110 Benevolent Street in Providence, Rhode Island, for most of her life, but traveled extensively in Europe and Asia. She often retold the story of one trip to China in 1923, when she was captured by armed bandits and held for two days before her release (the Lincheng Outrage).

Lucy died in Providence on January 12, 1955, and was buried at Swan Point Cemetery there. She was worth $2,500,000 at the time of her death.

=== Art collection ===
Lucy was an active art collector, especially in the fields of porcelain and Asian textiles. Between 1934 and 1956, she donated much of her collection to the Rhode Island School of Design Museum, and was a member of its Museum Committee as well. Her donation "is not only the single most significant gift of textiles to the Museum but is also one of the broadest and best collections of these materials in the world."
